= Bishop of Korea =

Bishop of Korea may refer to

- Anglican Bishop in Korea, 1889-1965
- Catholic Bishop of Korea, 1831–1911
