= Mark Pae =

Anglican archbishop (born 1952)

The Right Revd Mark Pae Du-hwan 배두환 마가 裵斗煥 마가
- Bishop of Daejeon
- Native name: 배두환
- Province: Korea
- See: Daejeon
- Appointed: 1 June 1974
- Installed: 3 June 1974
- Term ended: 1 October 1986
- Predecessor: Richard rutt
- Successor: Paul Yun Hwan
- Previous post: Dean of SeongKongHoe University

Orders
- Ordination: 5 October 1956
- Consecration: 1 June 1974 by Paul Lee Cheon-hwan

Personal details
- Born: Mark Pae Du-hwan; 5 November 1926 Suwon-gun, Gyeonggi-do, Korea under Japanese rule
- Died: 20 October 2013 (aged 86)
- Denomination: Anglican
- Education: Kyungpook National University
- Alma mater: Kyungpook National University; Sungkonghoe University

- Mark Pae
- Hangul: 배두환
- Hanja: 裵斗煥
- RR: Bae Duhwan
- MR: Pae Tuhwan

Baptismal name
- Hangul: 마가
- RR: Maga
- MR: Maga

Mark Pae (1926–2013) was an Anglican archdeacon and bishop in the 20th century.

Pae was born in 1926 and educated at Nashotah House, Wisconsin and ordained deacon in 1954 and priest in 1956. He was a priest in the Diocese of Korea to 1965 when the diocese was divided. He then worked in the new Taejon diocese as Archdeacon of Ch'ungch'ong and was appointed its bishop in 1974. He was consecrated a bishop on 1 June 1974 by Paul Cheon-hwan Lee, Bishop of Seoul, at Seoul Anglican Cathedral. His son is a priest in Great Neck, New York.
