= Ahmed Mohiuddin (disambiguation) =

Ahmed Mohiuddin may refer to:

- Ahmed Mohiuddin (1923–1998), Pakistani scientist, scholar
- Ahmed Mohiuddin (politician) (1898–19xx), Indian politician

== See also ==
- Mohiuddin Ahmed (died 2010), Bangladesh Army officer
- Mohiuddin Ahmad, Bangladeshi film director
- Mohiuddin Ahmad, Bangladeshi author
