= Bishop of Seoul =

Bishop of Seoul may refer to:

- the Bishop of Seoul in the Anglican Church of Korea
- the Archbishop of Seoul, the metropolitan bishop of the Catholic Archdiocese of Seoul
