= Onesimus Park =

South Korean Anglican bishop (born 1963)

The Most Reverend Onesimus Dongsin Park
- Bishop of Busan
- Native name: 박동신 오네시모
- Province: Anglican Church of Korea
- Diocese: Busan
- In office: 2012–present
- Predecessor: Solomon Yun Jong-mo
- Other posts: Primate of the Anglican Church of Korea, 2017–2018, 2024–2026

Orders
- Ordination: 1997 (priesthood)
- Consecration: 2002

Personal details
- Born: May 16, 1963 (age 63)
- Denomination: Anglican

- Onesimus Park
- Hangul: 박동신
- Hanja: 朴東信
- RR: Bak Dongsin
- MR: Pak Tongsin

Baptismal name
- Hangul: 오네시모
- RR: Onesimo
- MR: Onesimo

Onesimus Dongsin Park (박동신 오네시모 Hanja 朴東信, born May 16, 1963) is a South Korean Anglican bishop. He is the Anglican bishop of the Diocese of Busan and a former Primate of the Anglican Church of Korea.

Park was ordained to the priesthood in 1997 and consecrated as bishop of Busan in 2012. His first term as primate ran from May 2017, when he filled the remainder of retired Archbishop Paul Kim's unexpired term, until June 2018. In 2024, after Peter Kyongho Lee of the Diocese of Seoul reached the mandatory retirement age, Park was elected to a second non-consecutive two-year term as primate. He was succeeded as primate by Elijah Jang-whan Kim in 2026.

Anglican Communion titles
Preceded by Peter Kyongho Lee	Primate of the Anglican Church in Korea; 2024–2026	Succeeded by Elijah Jang-whan Kim
Preceded by Paul Kim	Primate of the Anglican Church in Korea; 2017–2018	Succeeded by Moses Nag Jun Yoo
Preceded by Solomon Yun Jong-mo	Bishop of Busan; 2012–present	
