= Ganghwa Anglican Church =

Historic church in Ganghwa, South Korea

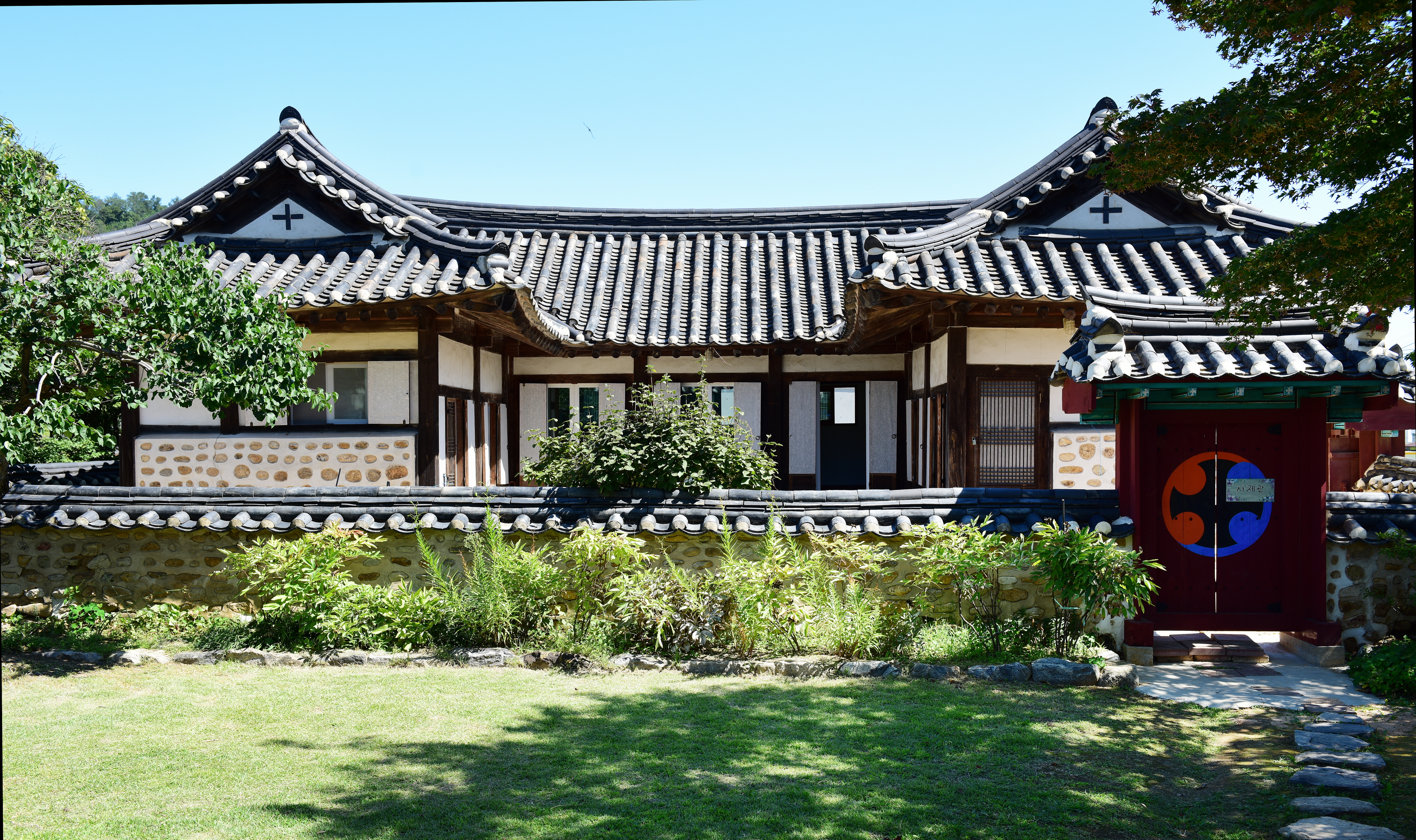
- Ganghwa Anglican Church
- 37.7485°N 126.4862°E
- Address: 10, Gwancheong-gil 27beon-gil, Ganghwa County, Incheon, South Korea
- Country: South Korea
- Denomination: Anglican

Architecture
- Heritage designation: Historic Sites of South Korea
- Designated: 2001-01-04

- Ganghwa Anglican Church
- Hangul: 대한성공회 강화성당
- Hanja: 大韓聖公會 江華聖堂
- Revised Romanization: Daehan-seonggonghoe Ganghwa-seongdang
- McCune–Reischauer: Taehan-sŏnggonghoe Kanghwa-sŏngdang

Ganghwa Anglican Church (Korean: 대한성공회 강화성당) is a historic church of the Anglican Church of Korea's Diocese of Seoul, located in Ganghwa-eup, Ganghwa County, Incheon, South Korea. It opened in November, 1900.

It was the first church to be established in Ganghwa, as well as the first Anglican church in the peninsula. The church is notable for its use of Korean hanok architecture.

== History ==
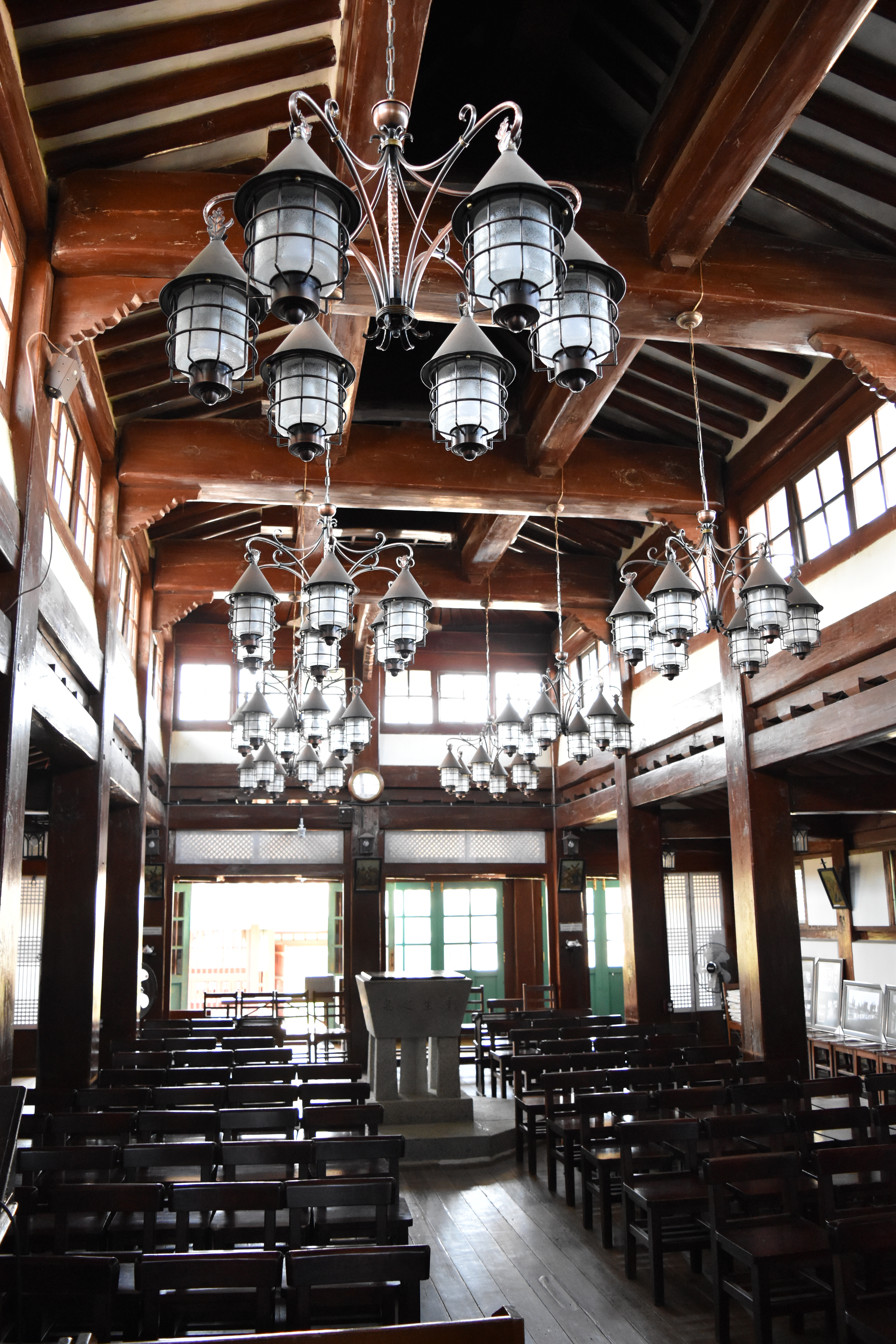
Interior view

The church has its origins around 1889, when the Anglican Church of Korea ordained its first bishop Charles Corfe. At the time, Christianity was virtually unknown in the peninsula. Ganghwa Anglican Church was completed on November 15, 1900. It was the first church to be established in Ganghwa, as well as the first Anglican church in the peninsula.

Wood was transported via the Yalu River for its construction. A palace carpenter who worked on the construction of the royal palace in Seoul Gyeongbokgung managed the construction of the building.

The composition of the church combines elements of both Eastern and Western architecture, with its layout particularly resembling Buddhist temples with Confucian elements. Similar to Buddhist temples, it has a number of gates that are entered in sequence. The main church building is a wooden building built in a nearly completely Korean style, with little Western ornamentation. It still functions as a church building.

The mid-height structure was built in the traditional Korean style, with its east-west axis measuring 10 kan (approximately 18.2 metres (60 ft)) and the north-south axis spanning 4 kan (approx. 7.3 metres (24 ft)). Though the interior was planned in the style of a Western basilica, the building is characterized by its traditional Korean wood joinery construction and tile roof. The use of a traditional Korean architectural style for the exterior was intended to ease resistance to the foreign religion. The church has its main entrance on the western side in the European style.

In January 2001 it was designated as Historic Site of Korea No.424.
