= Peter Kyongho Lee =

South Korean Anglican bishop

The Most Reverend Peter Kyongho Lee
- Primate of the Anglican Church of Korea; Bishop of Seoul
- Native name: 이경호 베드로
- Province: Anglican Church of Korea
- Diocese: Seoul
- In office: 2020–2024
- Predecessor: Moses Nak Jun Yoo
- Successor: Onesimus Park

Personal details
- Born: 1958 or 1959 (age 66–67)
- Denomination: Anglican

- Peter Kyongho Lee
- Hangul: 이경호
- Hanja: 李京浩
- RR: I Gyeongho
- MR: I Kyŏngho

Baptismal name
- Hangul: 베드로
- RR: Bedeuro
- MR: Pedŭro

Peter Kyongho Lee (Korean: 이경호 베드로) is a South Korean Anglican bishop. He has been bishop of Seoul since 2017 and primate of the Anglican Church of Korea since 2020. Lee retired as primate and diocesan bishop in the summer of 2024 after reaching the mandatory retirement age of 65.

Anglican Communion titles
| Preceded by Moses Nag Jun Yoo | Primate of the Anglican Church in Korea; 2020–2024 | Succeeded by Onesimus Park |
| Preceded by Paul Kim | Bishop of Seoul; 2017–2024 | Succeeded by Elijah Jang-Whan Kim |
