= Elijah Jang-Whan Kim =

South Korean Anglican bishop

The Most Reverend Elijah Jang-Whan Kim
- Primate of the Anglican Church of Korea; Bishop of Seoul
- Church: Anglican Church of Korea
- Diocese: Seoul
- In office: Since 2026 (as primate)
- Predecessor: Onesimus Park
- Other post: Bishop of Seoul (since 2024)

Orders
- Ordination: May 1998
- Consecration: 26 September 2024

Personal details
- Born: 1963 or 1964 (age 62–63)
- Denomination: Anglican

Korean name
- Hangul: 김장환
- RR: Gim Janghwan
- MR: Kim Changhwan

Elijah Jang-Whan Kim (Korean: 김장환) is a South Korean Anglican bishop. He has been bishop of Seoul since 2024 and primate of the Anglican Church of Korea since June 2026.

== Biography ==
Kim was born in 1963 or 1964 and ordained to the priesthood in May 1998. He began his ordained ministry as assistant priest at Suwon Church in Seoul and then from 1999 to 2005 he was a priest at Seoul's Dongsuwon Church. From 2005 to 2017, he was priest in charge at Osan Seoma Church, which was the largest evangelical church in the Diocese of Seoul. He served from 2017 to 2022 at Bundang Church and from 2022 to 2024 at Daehakro Church.

In April 2024, Kim was elected the seventh bishop of Seoul. As bishop of Seoul, his territory includes a missionary district comprising North Korea. As an evangelical Anglican, Kim's election marked a change in the diocese, which had traditionally practiced Anglo-Catholic churchmanship. He was consecrated and installed as bishop of Seoul at Seoul Anglican Cathedral on 26 September 2024.

Shortly after his installation as bishop, Kim requested an audit of diocesan accounts, which discovered the alleged embezzlement of ₩320 million (US$234711.65) by a diocesan official. The matter was reported to authorities and the official, a priest, was suspended from ministry and later returned a portion of the funds.

In July 2025, Kim visited the Korean convocation of the Episcopal Diocese of Los Angeles in the United States. Later that year, the Diocese of Seoul donated ₩40 million (US$28133.77) to create an "Anglican forest" in an area of Mongolia experiencing desertification. The initiative included the planting of 3,000 trees.

On 13 June 2026, during the 35th national synod of the Anglican Church of Korea, Kim was unanimously elected to a renewable two-year term as primate of the church. Kim said that he would focus on "fostering true church unity, igniting a spiritual church revival and expanding our meaningful contribution to the Anglican Communion."

Anglican Communion titles
Preceded by Peter Kyongho Lee	Bishop of Seoul; Since 2024	Incumbent
Preceded by Onesimus Park	Primate of the Anglican Church in Korea; Since 2026	Incumbent
