= List of religious groups in Korea =

This is a partial list of religious groups in Korea.

== Buddhist ==
- Jogye Order
- Cheontae
- Taego Order
- Won Buddhism

== Christian ==
- Anglican Church of Korea
- Catholic Church in South Korea
- Christian Congregation of Jehovah's Witnesses
- The Church of Jesus Christ of Latter-day Saints in South Korea
- Korea Baptist Convention
- Korea Campus Crusade for Christ
- Korean Orthodox Church
- Presbyterian Church of Korea
- Providence
- Unification Church
- All Nations Church
- World Mission Society Church of God

== Other ==
- Bocheon-gyo
- Cheondogyo
- Daesun Jinrihoe
- Jeung San Do
- Jeungsanism
- Juche
- Muism
- Taejonggyo

== See also ==
- Hinduism in South Korea
- Islam in Korea
- Korean Confucianism
- Religion in Korea
- Religion in North Korea
- Religion in South Korea
- Taoism in Korea
