= Shirt stud =

Small removable closure, usually made in sets, for shirts

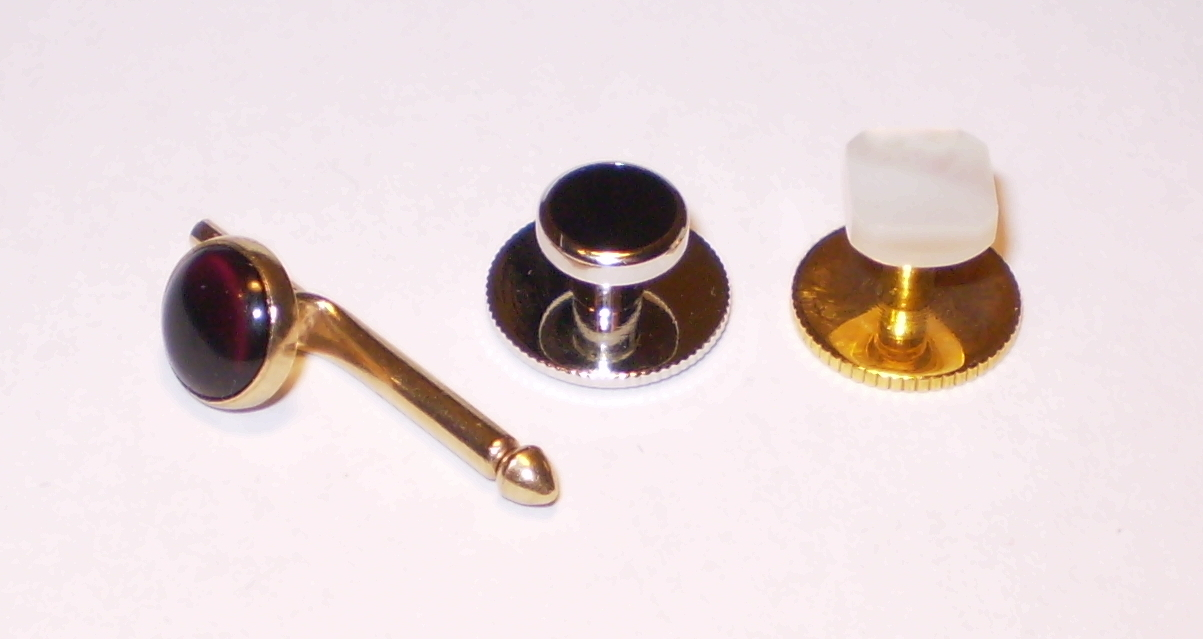
From left to right: A sliding-pin stud set with red glass; a screw-back evening stud set with cabochon onyx; and a screw-back stud with mother-of-pearl affixed to brass.

A shirt stud is a decorative fastener that fits onto a buttonhole on the front of a pleated shirt, or onto the starched bib of a stiff-front shirt. Such shirts have special buttonholes solely for shirt studs.

== Details ==
A shirt stud may be fashioned from alloys, precious metals, and gemstones—materials uncommon to buttons sewn on shirts. The stud may have an inlay, such as of pearl or onyx.

Dress code of the modern western world reserves shirt studs for men's formal wear and some semi-formal occasions.

In the western world, shirt studs were first used in the mid-19th century, when some shirt fronts were too stiff to close with buttons. So remains the case for the heavily starched, modern full dress shirts worn with white tie.

== See also ==
- Bachelor button (sewing)
- Stonesetting
- Tie pin
