= Bachelor button (sewing) =

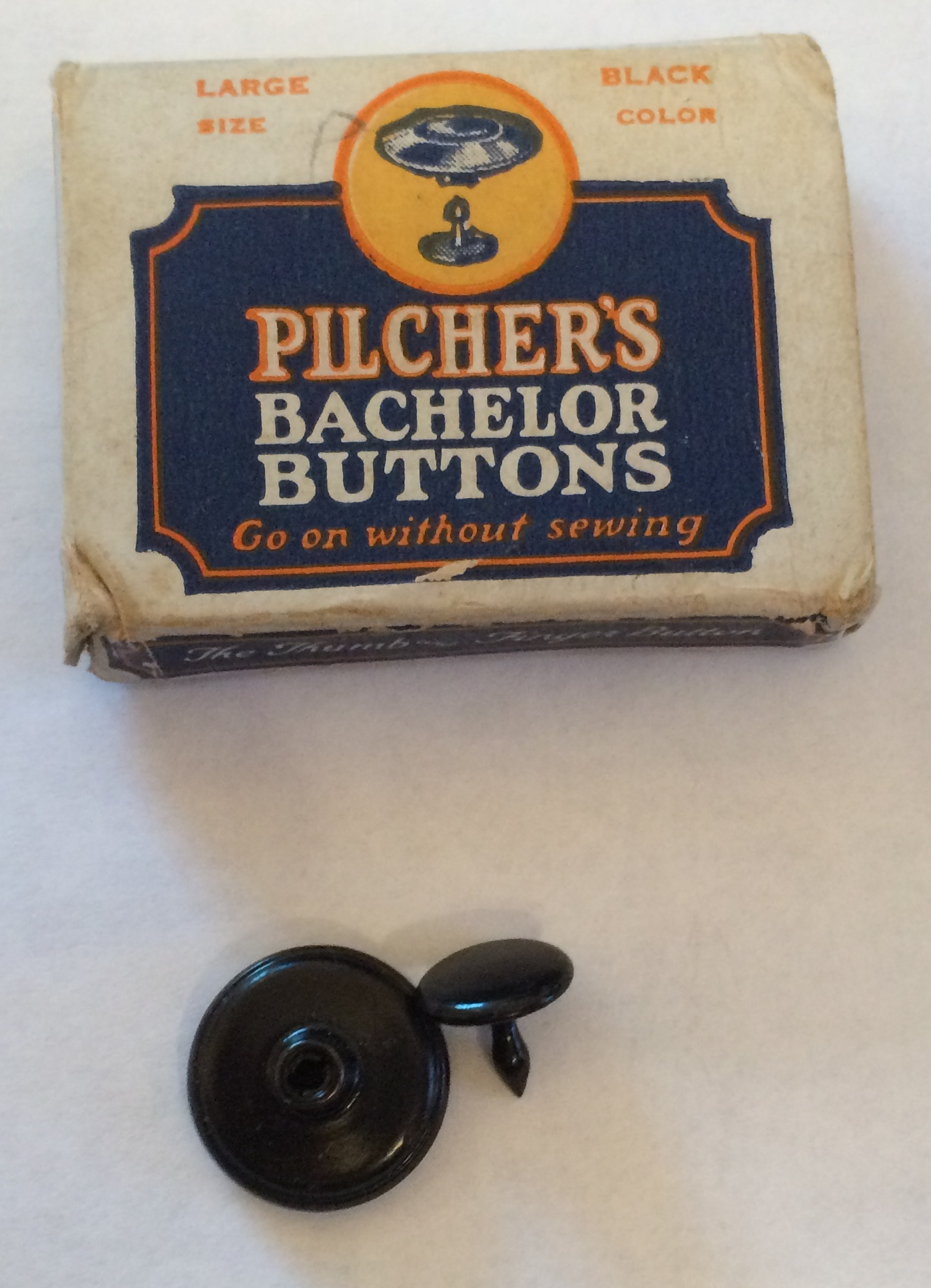
Pilcher's Bachelor Button and box circa 1917

A bachelor button is a button that can be attached without sewing. It uses a stud pressed through fabric and into a top button. They were sold in notion stores in the late 1800s and early 1900s as an emergency repair button. They could be attached and removed. The poem “A Bachelor's Button” is a lament by a man whose lover never sewed his button on his coat and had to use a bachelor's button to repair it.
