= Arthur Turner (bishop) =

English bishop

The Right Reverend Arthur Turner
- Bishop in Korea
- Province: Canterbury
- See: Seoul
- Appointed: 1905
- Installed: 1905
- Term ended: 1910
- Predecessor: Charles John Corfe
- Successor: Mark Napier Trollope

Orders
- Ordination: 1888
- Consecration: 25 January 1905
- Rank: Bishop

Personal details
- Born: 2 December 1862
- Died: 28 October 1910 (aged 47)
- Denomination: Anglican
- Education: Marlborough College; Keble College, Oxford

Arthur Beresford Turner (24 August 1862 – 28 October 1910) was the second Anglican Bishop in Korea from 1905 until his death from blood poisoning five years later.

Born into an ecclesiastical family, he was educated at Marlborough College and Keble College, Oxford. After graduating, he studied for ordination at Ripon College Cuddesdon before curacies at Watlington, Oxfordshire and Downton, Wiltshire. He was ordained priest by John Mackarness, Bishop of Oxford, at Cuddesdon Parish Church on 27 May 1888.

After a further four years as senior curate at Newcastle Cathedral he went to Korea to be part of the USPG missionary team. For the next 14 years he was a devoted servant to the emergent Korean church. He was consecrated a bishop by Randall Davidson, Archbishop of Canterbury, in Westminster Abbey on the Feast of the Conversion of St Paul (25 January) 1905; and served as missionary "Bishop in Corea" until he died in post. A noted cricketer, he died "whilst still at the height of his powers" from blood poisoning.

Church of England titles
Preceded by Charles Corfe	Bishop in Korea; 1905 – 1910	Succeeded by Mark Trollope
