= Paul Kim (Anglican bishop) =

Anglican archbishop (born 1952)

The Right Revd Paul Geun Sang Kim 김근상 바우로
- Bishop of Seoul; Primate and Metropolitan of the Anglican Church of Korea
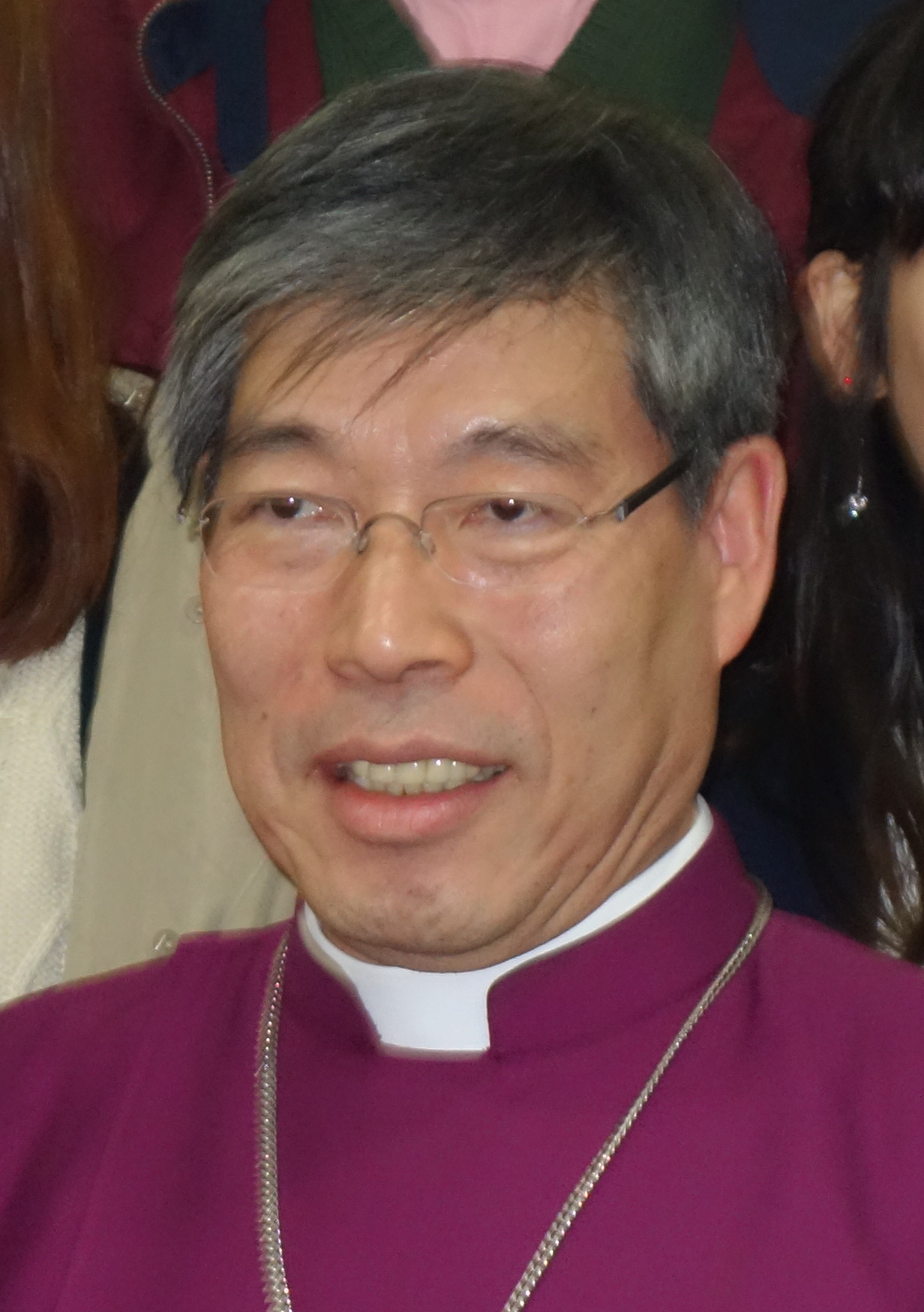
- Native name: 김근상
- Province: Korea
- See: Seoul
- Appointed: January 2008
- Installed: 15 January 2009
- Term ended: 24 April 2017
- Predecessor: Francis Kyeong Jo Park
- Successor: Peter Kyongho Lee
- Previous post: Dean of Seoul Anglican Cathedral

Orders
- Ordination: 1980
- Consecration: 27 May 2008 by Francis Kyeong Jo Park

Personal details
- Born: Paul Geun-Sang Kim; 1952 (age 73–74)
- Denomination: Anglican
- Education: Sogang University; Catholic University of Korea; Sungkonghoe University

- Paul Kim
- Hangul: 김근상
- Hanja: 金根祥
- RR: Gim Geunsang
- MR: Kim Kŭnsang

Baptismal name
- Hangul: 바우로
- RR: Bauro
- MR: Pauro

Paul Geun-Sang Kim (also Keun-Sang and similar; born 1952) is an Anglican bishop of the Diocese of Seoul and the former Primate of the Province of Korea.

He was ordained in 1980 and was elected bishop in January 2008, to take the place of the soon-to-retire, Primate of Korea and Bishop of Seoul Francis Kyung Jo Park. He was consecrated on May 27, 2008 and succeeded Bishop Park on January 15, 2009. In 2010, to succeed the Primate of Korea, Solomon Jong Mo Yoon, he was elected Primate of the Province of Korea.
