= Mohiuddin Ahmad (author) =

Bangladeshi writer and political historiographer

- মহিউদ্দিন আহমদ
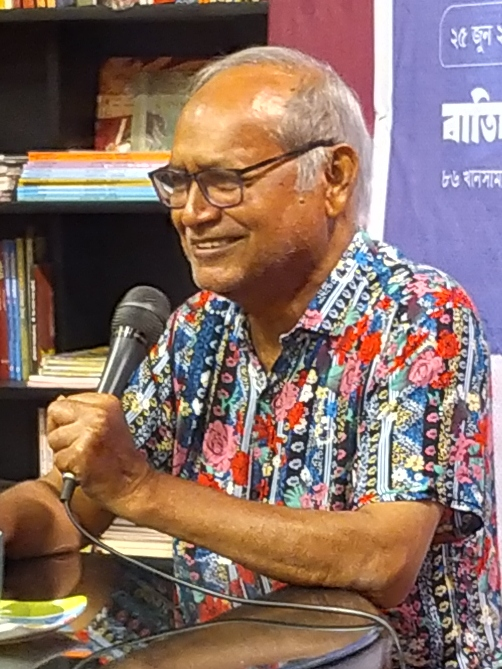
- Born: 1952 (age 73–74); Dhaka
- Citizenship: Bangladeshi
- Education: MA in economics
- Alma mater: Dhaka College; University of Dhaka
- Writing career
- Language: Bengali
- Genres: History, research
- Subjects: Political history of Bangladesh and its political parties

Mohiuddin Ahmad (Bengali: মহিউদ্দিন আহমদ; born 1952) is a Bangladeshi writer and political historiographer, mainly known for his historical studies of the major political parties in Bangladesh. His notable works include Jasader Utthan Patan: Asthir Samayer Rajniti (The Rise and Fall of JASAD: Politics of Restless Time), Awami League: Utthanparba 1948–1970 (Awami League: The Ascent 1948–1970), Awami League: Juddhadiner Kotha (Awami League: Story of War Days) and BNP: Samay-Asamay (BNP: Ups and Downs).

== Biography ==
Born in Dhaka, he studied economics at the University of Dhaka. He was elected co-general secretary of Haji Muhammad Mohsin Hall Students’ Union in the election of Dhaka University Students’ Union in 1970. He worked as a reporter and assistant editor in the Daily Ganakantha. He also directed a master's programme in NGO studies at Sungkonghoe University in South Korea, where he was also a professor.

== Works ==
- 'Jasader Utthan Patan: Asthir Samayer Rajniti (জাসদের উত্থান পতন: অস্থির সময়ের রাজনীতি, The Rise and Fall of JASAD: Politics of Restless Time, 2014)
- Ek-Egaro: Bangladesh 2007-2008 (এক-এগারো: বাংলাদেশ ২০০৭-২০০৮, One-Eleven: Bangladesh 2007–2008, 2019)
- BNP: Samay-Asamay (বিএনপি : সময়-অসময়, BNP: Good Times, Bad Times)
- Awami League: Utthanparba 1948–1970 (আওয়ামী লীগঃ উত্থানপর্ব ১৯৪৮-১৯৭০, Awami League: The Ascent 1948–1970)
- Awami League: Juddhadiner Kotha (আওয়ামী লীগ : যুদ্ধদিনের কথা ১৯৭১, Awami League: Story of War Days)
- Rajneetir Ameemangsita Gadya (রাজনীতির অমীমাংসিত গদ্য, Uncompromised Prose of Politics)
- Ei Deshe Ekdin Juddha Hoyechilo (এই দেশে একদিন যুদ্ধ হয়েছিল, War Took Place One Day in This Country)
- Itihaser Jatree (ইতিহাসের যাত্রী, History-Treader)
- Boma Banduker Chorabajar (বোমা বন্দুকের চোরাবাজার, Black Market of Bombs and Guns)
- 32 Namber Pasher Bari: 25 March 15 August (৩২ নম্বর পাশের বাড়ি: ২৫ মার্চ ১৫ আগস্ট)
- Bangalir Japan Abishkar (বাঙালির জাপান আবিষ্কার, Bengali's Discovery of Japan)
- Bela-Abela: Bangladesh 1972-1975 (বেলা-অবেলা: বাংলাদেশ ১৯৭২–১৯৭৫, Good Times Bad Times: Bangladesh 1972–1975)
- লাল সন্ত্রাস: সিরাজ সিকদার ও সর্বহারা রাজনীতি Mohiuddin Ahmmod - মহিউদ্দিন আহমদ

=== In English ===
- Seol Diary
