= Charles Corfe =

Anglican bishop in Korea (1843–1921)

The Right Reverend Charles Corfe
- Bishop in Korea
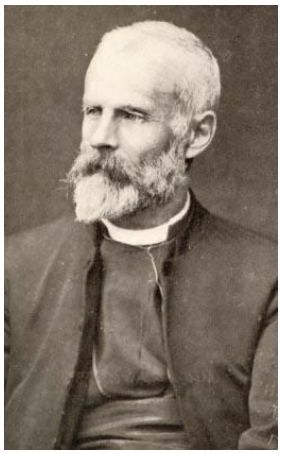
- Charles John Corfe
- Province: Canterbury
- See: Seoul
- Appointed: 1889
- Installed: 29 September 1890
- Term ended: 1904
- Successor: Arthur Turner
- Previous posts: Royal Navy Chaplain; Tutor at St Michael's College, Tenbury

Orders
- Ordination: 1866
- Consecration: 1 November 1889 by Edward White Benson
- Rank: Bishop

Personal details
- Born: 1843
- Died: 20 June 1921 (aged 77–78)
- Denomination: Anglican
- Education: All Souls College, Oxford

Charles John Corfe (1843 – 20 June 1921) was the inaugural Anglican Bishop in Korea from 1889 to 1904.

== Biography ==
Charles Corfe was born in Salisbury, on 14 May 1843, and was the eldest son of Charles Corfe, Organist of Christ Church Cathedral, Oxford.

Corfe was one of the four "Bible Clerks" educated as an undergraduate at All Souls College, Oxford. After graduating he had a brief spell teaching at St Michael's College, Tenbury before being ordained in 1866. For the next 22 years he was a Royal Navy Chaplain.

On All Saints' Day (1 November) 1889 he was consecrated by Edward White Benson, Archbishop of Canterbury, as missionary bishop of Chosun (Korea, then spelled Corea) in Westminster Abbey and was awarded an honorary DD on his appointment in Korea.

In 1890, he established the Church of St Michael and All the Angels in Seoul and started three hospitals, two in Seoul and one in Jemulpo (Incheon). Until 1891, he was also the bishop responsible for Manchuria before the area formed the diocese of North China. In 1897, he baptised the first Anglicans and performed the ritual in Korean.

He tendered his resignation to the Archbishop of Canterbury shortly before St James's Day (25 July) 1904, when he wrote a letter to his diocese; by 16 September, the Archbishop had accepted Corfe's resignation and named Arthur Turner his successor. On his retirement he published an account of his pioneering efforts entitled The Anglican Church in Corea.

Henry Hutchinson Montgomery wrote the biography, Charles John Corfe, Naval Chaplain - Bishop in 1927.

Church of England titles
| New title | Bishop in Korea; 1889 – 1904 | Succeeded by Arthur Turner |
