= Sungkonghoe University =

Private university in Seoul, South Korea

- 성공회대학교
- Former name: St. Michael Theological School
- Motto: 열림, 나눔, 섬김
- Motto in English: Openness, Service, Sharing
- Type: Private
- Established: 1914 - 04 - 30 (Saint Michael's Theological School); 1994 (reorganized as a comprehensive university)
- Affiliations: Anglican
- President: Kyoung Moon Kim
- Administrative staff: 287
- Undergraduates: 3,090
- Postgraduates: 447
- Location: Guro, Seoul, South Korea
- Campus: 39,431 m^{2} (424,430 sq ft)
- Website: www.skhu.ac.kr

Korean name
- Hangul: 성공회대학교
- Hanja: 聖公會大學校
- RR: Seonggonghoe daehakgyo
- MR: Sŏnggonghoe taehakkyo

Sungkonghoe University is a private university in Seoul, South Korea. It was originally founded in 1914 by the Anglican Communion and became a comprehensive university in 1994. It is one of the most progressive universities in South Korea with an academic mission dedicated to the promotion of human rights, democracy, and peace on the Korean peninsula. It is particularly respected in the research and education of social sciences. In addition, it is the only university in Korea that has a theological graduate school that trains Anglican priests.

== Vision and Goals ==
=== Vision ===
A University of Human Rights and Peace

=== Educational Goals ===
1. Pursuing education that strengthens the roots
2. Building social solidarity by "sharing the rain together" (standing together through shared hardships)
3. Creating spaces and cultures where values come alive

=== Desired Qualities of Graduates ===
Citizens committed to seeking alternatives and advancing solidarity and action based on the values of human rights, peace, ecology, and democracy

== History ==
=== Origins (1914–1960) ===
St. Michael's Seminary was founded in 1914 laying the groundwork for what would become, in 1994, Sungkonghoe University. The current rector is the Rev. Kyoung Moon Kim, an Anglican priest and a theologian.

- April 1914 - School opens under the name of St. Michael's Theological School in Ganghwa, Incheon.
- May 1921 - Moves from Ganghwa to Incheon.
- March 1940 - Political oppression results in forced closure of the shrine by Japanese police.
- April 1952 - School moves from Incheon to Cheongju.

=== Development (1961–1994) ===
- September 1961 - Moves to Hangdong, Guro, Seoul (present location).
- March 1982 - reorganizes as Cheonsin Theological seminary (four-year course of studies).
- March 1988 - Department of Social Welfare established.
- February 1992 - Permission granted to raise status to Sungkonghoe Theological Seminary.

=== Expansion (1994–present) ===
The school has been an active member of CUAC (Colleges and Universities of Anglican Communion) since it joined in 1995. In 1999 it became a member of the Democracy Consortium of Universities with Sang-ji University and Han-shin University in 1999.

- September 1994 - Name changed from Sungkonghoe Theological Seminary to Sungkonghoe University.
- March 1996 - Department of Journalism and Broadcasting / Graduate School of Theology established
- November 1999 - General Graduate School / Graduate School of Education established.
- April 2000 - pro-democracy movement Library opened.
- April 2003 - school fence removed.
- October 2010 - Theological building construction complete.
- April 2014 - Centennial(100th anniversary) ceremony / academic symposium held.
- April 2019 - Dormitory ‘The Forest’ opened.
- March 2022 - Establishment of new majors of Artificial intelligence and Applied big data
- March 2024 - Reorganization of the Undergraduate System. Division of Global Studies established.

== Campus ==
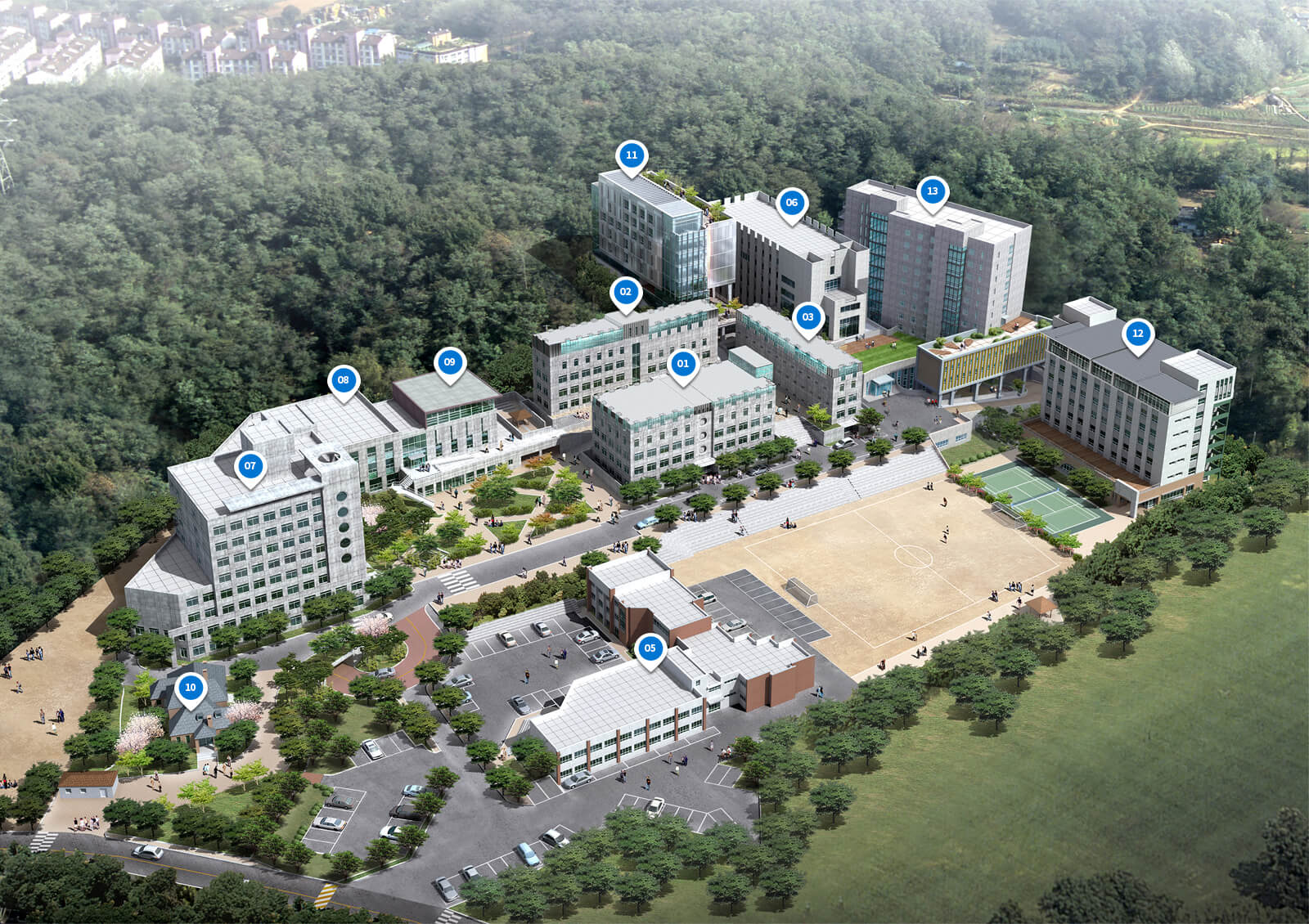
성공회대학교 캠퍼스 이미지

Campus

- Sungkonghoe University is located in Guro-gu, Seoul, covering approximately 39,000 m². The campus was relocated to its current site in 1956. It contains administrative buildings, lecture halls, libraries, dormitories, and chapels, as well as facilities for student services and research.

Convenience and Auxiliary Facilities

- The campus includes a student cafeteria (Cafeteria ECO) in Saechun-nyeon Hall, a 24-hour convenience store (Emart 24), a post office and stationery shop in Nanum Hall, and various student lounges and club rooms.

Dormitories

- The university operates two main dormitories. Michael Dormitory provides communal kitchens and dining spaces, with separate facilities for male and female students. Happy Dormitory includes shared kitchens and dining areas in its basement.

Inclusive Facilities

- In March 2022, Sungkonghoe University introduced Korea’s first on-campus gender-neutral restroom, called “Everyone’s Toilet,” designed with accessibility features such as voice assistance, automatic doors, and Braille signage.

External Evaluation

- September 2003: The South Korean newspaper, JoongAng Ilbo (중앙일보), selected Sungkonghoe University for the upper ranks in all categories of Sociology in its National University Evaluation.

National Project Activities

- February 2004: The Ministry of Information and Communication (MIC) of South Korea selected Sungkonghoe University as a newly supported institution for its IT Department Curriculum Reorganization Support Project.
- March 2005: Sungkonghoe University was selected for the Ministry of Information and Communication's IT Faculty Recruitment Support Project.

== Academics ==
=== Undergraduate ===
With a liberal arts college model, students are free to choose their own majors once they enter the undergraduate program.

==== Division of Humanities ====
- English Studies
- Japanese Studies
- Chinese Studies
- Christian Culture Studies

==== Division of Business Administration ====
- Business Administration

==== Division of Social Sciences ====
- Sociology
- Political Science and International Relations
- Economics
- Social Welfare

==== Division of Media&Contents ====
- Media&Journalism
- Digital Contents
- Video Contents

==== Division of Future convergence ====
- Artificial Intelligence
- Applied Big Data

==== Division of Convergent Computer Science ====
- Computer Science

==== Division of Global Studies ====
(Recruits Only International Students)

- Global Media Art Management
- Global Digital Management

=== Postgraduate ===
- Graduate School of Social Sciences
- Graduate School of Theology
- Graduate School of Education
- Graduate School of Social Welfare
- Graduate School of Peace and Civil society
- Graduate School of Culture and Communications
- Graduate School of Social and Solidarity Economy
- Graduate School of MA in Inter-Asia NGO Studies (MAINS)

=== Research Centers ===
- Institute for East Asian Studies (EAI)
- Democracy and Social Movements Institute (DaSM)
- Research Center for Social Enterprise

=== International Exchange ===
This university has established exchange agreements with various overseas institutions and operates student exchange as well as joint research programs. The main partner universities include the following.

- Rikkyo University, 일본
- Pädagogische Hochschule Ludwigsburg, 독일
- Mondragon University, 스페인
- Ocean University of China, 중국
- University of Malaya, 말레이시아
- Okinawa University, 일본
- Toyama University of International Studies, 일본
- Shih Hsin University, 대만
- LeTourneau University, 미국

In addition, the university operates student exchange and academic cooperation programs with various institutions across Asia, Europe, and the Americas

== Student Activity ==
=== Students' News ===
- Sungkonghoe University Media center

It is a university press organization that quickly conveys the news occurring in the school and reports the problems in the school in depth from a critical perspective. It is an official press organization in the school that publishes and distributes Sungkonghoe university newspaper.

=== Students' Clubs ===
For all students, Clubs are operating autonomously by students. They have many kinds of clubs for them. Although the recruitment period is different each club. However in general, they recruit members at the beginning of the semester.

- 꾼
- 아침햇살
- 탈
- BIS
- ELPIS
- C.O.L
- M.R.C
- FC SKHU
- SKHUbile
- CCC
- FLOW
- Puzzle
- IVF
- S.owl
- 콕
- ROOT
- 어흥
- SKHU Turtles
- 화랑
- 언어와의 작별

== Notable people ==
- Mohiuddin Ahmad, writer and researcher, taught at the university.
- Lee Ji-hye, singer, alumna of the Department of Social Welfare.
- Badrul Hisham Shaharin, a Malaysian activist and politician.

== Notable Events ==
- Implementation of the first "Restroom for All" on a Korean university campus

In 2022, Sungkonghoe University became the first university in Korea to establish an on-campus “Restroom for All” (모두를 위한 화장실). These facilities were designed to be inclusive spaces accessible to transgender and non-binary individuals, people with disabilities, parents with children, elderly users, and others who may require more private or flexible restroom options.

- In 2024, Sungkonghoe University successfully passed all five evaluation domains — institutional mission and management, curriculum and teaching, faculty and staff, student support and facilities, and performance and social accountability — in the Institutional Accreditation conducted by the Korean University Accreditation Institute (a subsidiary of the Korean Council for University Education). The certification was formally conferred on December 19, 2024, and is valid for five years.

== See also ==
- Anglican Church of Korea
- List of universities and colleges in South Korea
- Onsu station
- Rikkyo University
- Dormitory
