= Anglican Church of Korea =

Province of the Anglican Communion in North and South Korea

- Coat of arms of the Anglican Church of Korea
- Classification: Protestant
- Orientation: Anglican (Note: With a historically Anglo-Catholic origin.)
- Scripture: Holy Bible (Note: The ecumenical Revised Common Translation Bible (Korean: 공동번역 성서 개정판; Hanja: 共同飜譯 聖書 改訂版; RR: Gongdong-beonyeok Seongseo Gaejeongpan) with Apocrypha is officially used.)
- Theology: Anglican doctrine
- Polity: Episcopal
- Primate: Elijah Jang-Whan Kim
- Headquarters: Seoul
- Territory: Korea (Note: Covering both of North and South Korea.) (de jure); South Korea (de facto)
- Members: About 50,000
- Official website: anglicankr.church

Korean name
- Hangul: 대한성공회
- Hanja: 大韓聖公會
- RR: Daehan seonggonghoe
- MR: Taehan sŏnggonghoe

The Anglican Church of Korea (Korean: 대한성공회) is the province of the Anglican Communion in North Korea (de jure) and South Korea (de jure and de facto). Founded in 1889, it has over 120 parish and mission churches with a total membership of roughly 65,000 people in South Korea. In 2017, there were 80,100 Anglicans in South Korea.

== History ==
=== Birth of the Anglican Church of Korea ===
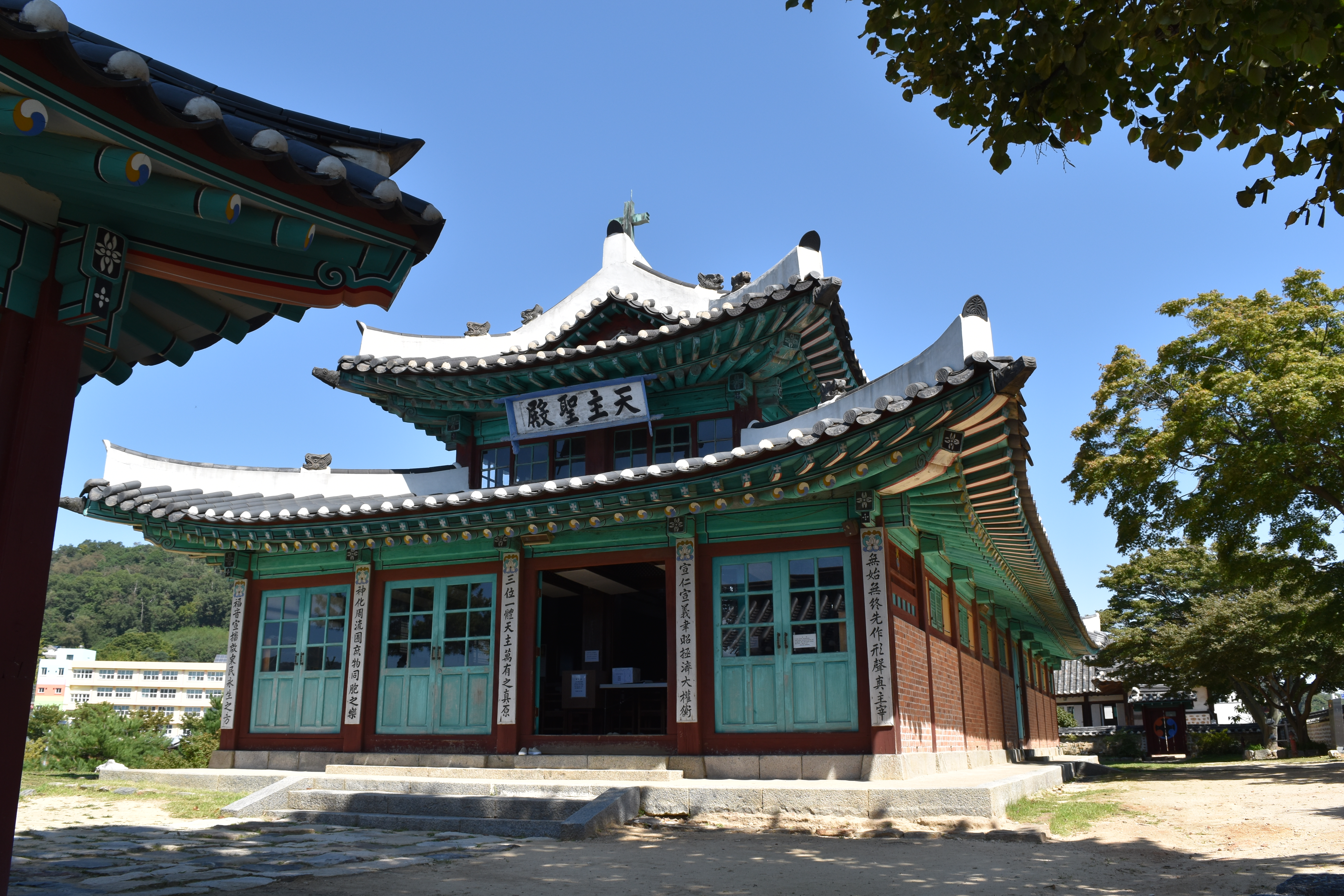
Ganghwa Anglican Church

The Anglican Church of Korea can be traced back to November 1, 1889, when Bishop Charles John Corfe was ordained at Westminster Abbey and inaugurated as the first diocesan bishop of Joseon (Korea). With his colleagues who had been invited to join the mission, he arrived in Incheon Port on 29 September 1890. Nae-dong Anglican Church which is the first Anglican Church in Korea was established by him and Eli Barr Landis (1865–1898) on September 30, 1891 at Nae-dong, Jung-gu, Incheon. He initiated his work in the Seoul area, including Gyeonggi and Chungcheong provinces. He first opened a number of educational institutions, medical facilities and social work centers across the country, such as the Sinmyeong (Faith and Enlightenment) schools and the hospitals in the vicinities of Incheon, Yeoju and Jincheon as well as orphanages in Suwon and Anjung. The Anglican missionaries also sought possible ways for the church to be integrated into Korean culture. As a result of that effort, there are several Anglican Church buildings which were constructed in the traditional Korean architecture and which survive today such as Ganghwa Anglican Church. In addition, the early missionaries made pioneering contributions to Korean studies.

=== Early missionary work ===
Beginning in 1923 mission work was carried out in the northern part of the peninsula such as Pyongan and Hwanghae Provinces. To train the local clergy St. Michael's Theological Institute, the forerunner of the present Sungkonghoe University, was established in 1923, followed by the Society of the Holy Cross (convent) in 1925. Also, the Cathedral Church of St. Mary the Virgin and St. Nicholas in downtown Seoul was constructed in 1924 and is known for its Romanesque architecture as it is the only one in this fashion in the orient, together with its mosaic murals.

=== Japanese colonial rule ===
Due to considerable difficulties with the language barrier, personal health problems, and other incidents, the mission work had little success throughout the later years, especially during the 36-year period of Japanese colonial rule. This colonial rule caused significant obstacles to Church development in Korea, primarily because those missionaries appeared to have an indifferent attitude to the Korean independence movement at that time.

=== First native bishop ===
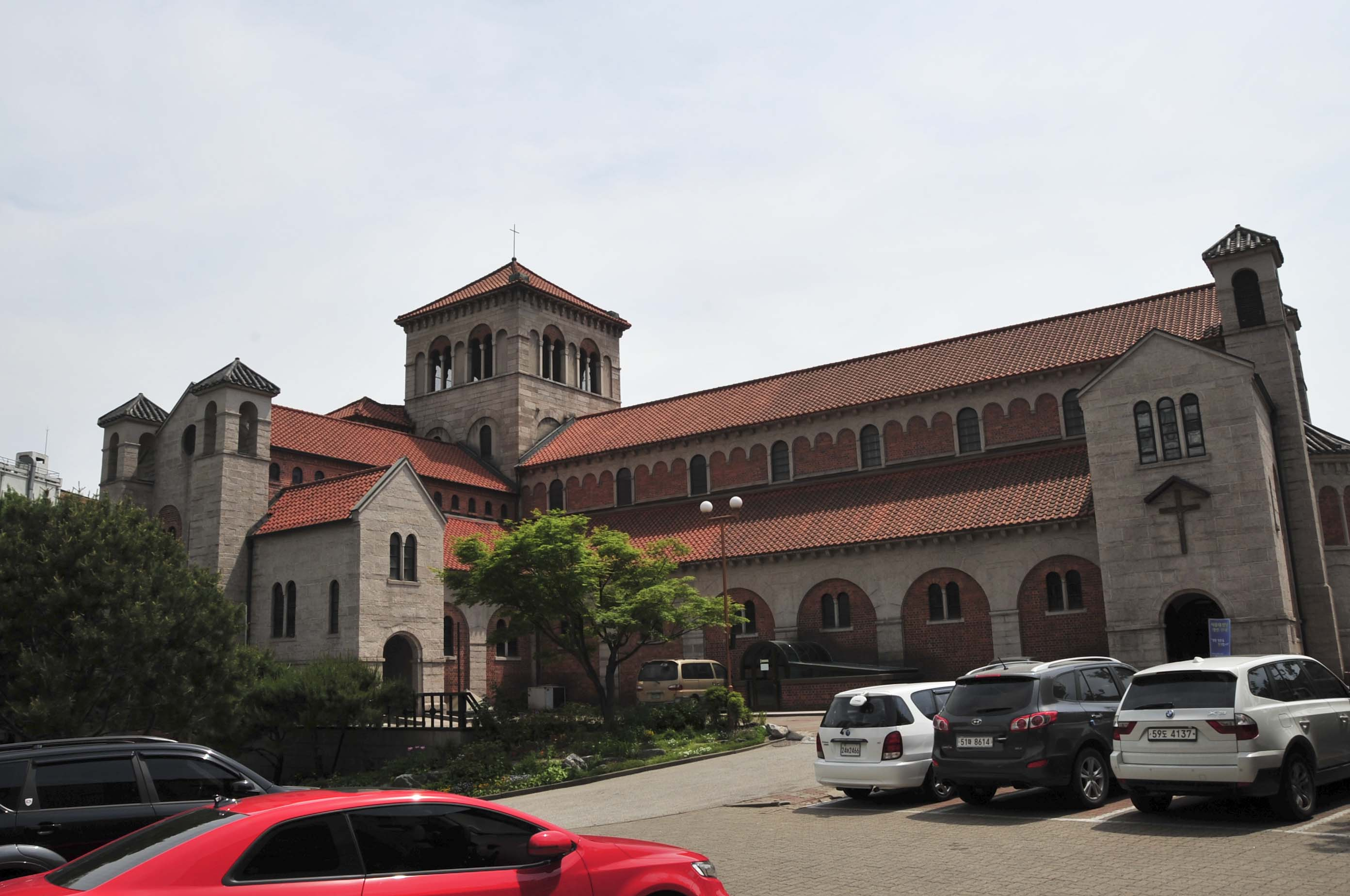
Seoul Anglican Cathedral

Despite such an unfavorable situation as illustrated, the first native Korean bishop, Cheon-hwan Lee, was ordained in 1965 after 20 years had lapsed since liberation from Japanese rule. Thus the original Korean mission diocese was formed into the two dioceses of Seoul and Daejeon, followed by the separate additional forming of the Diocese of Busan in 1974. In 1974, he received an honorary CBE from Queen Elizabeth II. He died on 26 March 2010.

=== Recent expansion ===
Since the 1970s the Anglican Church has expanded through opening a number of new churches across country. St Peter's School was founded in 1975 to provide special needs children with effective special education as needed. St. Michael's Theological Seminary was also upgraded to be accredited by the government in 1982 and 10 years later it was again upgraded and expanded as a university to satisfies the peoples' great needs in the coming new era.

The three dioceses continued steady growth in numbers of churches and social evangelization under the auspices of the second and third generations of Korean bishops. The Church has thus been active in constructing new church buildings, along with its continued efforts in opening the new additional churches since the mid-1980s. In this context the Board of Mission and Education has played a role in offering education and training programs.

On occasion of its centennial anniversary on September 29, 1990, the Anglican Church of Korea reaffirmed its intent under the theme. "Jesus Christ, Life of the Nation", to continue proclaiming the message of life to the people and expediting the peaceful reunification of Korea as desired.

The Provincial Constitution of the Anglican Church of Korea was declared on September 29, 1992, and the first Korean primate was inaugurated on April 16, 1993. Thus, the Church has become an independent national church.

== Theology ==
The Anglican Church of Korea has clergy and members reflecting diverse views. The church ordains women as priests and has been doing so since 2001. Some clergy, congregations, and members of the denomination have been affirming and supportive of LGBT rights including by participating in Pride events. The Anglican Church in Korea is considered to be more open toward homosexuality and is discussing the matter. One cleric, representing the Anglican Church in a Korean Christian dialogue, presented a "let's see" approach regarding homosexuality.

== Structure and leadership ==
- Province of Korea
- Hangul: 한국관구
- Hanja: 韓國管區
- RR: Hangukgwangu
- MR: Han'gukkwan'gu

The church was previously under the authority of the archbishop of Canterbury. To mark independence in 1993, the archbishop of Canterbury handed his authority as metropolitan and primate to the first archbishop of Korea. The church now forms a single metropolitical Province of Korea, consisting of three dioceses: Seoul, Busan, and Daejeon. The primacy rotates among the three; thus the current bishop of Seoul is also the Archbishop of Korea and Primate of the Church.

=== Archbishops of Korea ===
- 1993 – 1995: Simon Kim Seong-su, Bishop of Seoul
- 1995: Paul Yun Hwan, Bishop of Daejeon (acting archbishop)
- 1995 – 1997: Benedict Kim Jae-heon, Bishop of Busan
- 1997 – 2000: Matthew Chung Chul-beom, Bishop of Seoul

=== Primate of Korea ===
- 2000 – 2003: Paul Yun Hwan, Bishop of Daejeon
- 2003 – 2005: Matthew Chung Chul-beom, Bishop of Seoul
- 2005: Joseph Lee Dae-yong, Bishop of Busan
- 2005 – 2006: Andrew Shin Hyeon-sam, Bishop of Daejeon
- 2006 – 2009: Francis Park Kyeong-jo, Bishop of Seoul
- 2009: Solomon Yun Jong-mo, Bishop of Busan (acting Primate)
- 2009 – 2010: Solomon Yun Jong-mo, Bishop of Busan
- 2010 – 2017: Paul Kim Keun-sang, Bishop of Seoul
- 2017 – 2018: Onesimus Park Dong-shin, Bishop of Busan
- 2018 – 2020: Moses Yoo Nak-jun, Bishop of Daejeon
- 2020 – 2024: Peter Lee Kyongho, Bishop of Seoul
- 2024 – 2026: Onesimus Park Dong-shin, Bishop of Busan
- 2026—present: Elijah Jang-Whan Kim, Bishop of Seoul

=== Diocese of Seoul ===
- Diocese of Seoul
- Hangul: 서울교구
- Hanja: 서울敎區
- RR: Seoul gyogu
- MR: Sŏul kyogu

The current Diocese of Seoul was founded as the Joseon (Korea) diocese, covering all the Korean peninsula, in 1889. It was split in 1965, to create Taejon diocese, at which point it became Seoul diocese. The current bishop is Elijah Kim JangHwan, an evangelical in a traditionally Anglo-Catholic diocese.

==== Bishops in Korea ====
The Bishop in Korea was an Anglican missionary appointment from 1889 to 1965 when the diocese was divided.

Tenure	Incumbent	Notes
1889 to 1905	Charles Corfe	(1843–1921)
1905 to 1910	Arthur Turner	(1862–1910)
1911 to 1930	Mark Trollope	(1862–1930)
1931 to 1954	Cecil Cooper	(1882–1964)
1955 to 1965	John Daly	(1901–1985) Became first bishop of Daejeon

==== Bishops of Seoul ====
- 1965–1985: Paul Lee Cheon-hwan (Paul Lee, first native bishop; consecrated shortly before 13 August 1965)
- 1985–1995: Simon Kim Seong-su
- 1995–2005: Matthew Chung Chul-beom
- 2005–2009: Francis Park Kyeong-jo
- 2009–2017: Paul Kim Keun-sang
- 2017–2024: Peter Kyongho Lee
- 2024–present: Elijah JangHwan Kim

==== Assistant bishops ====
- 1926–1930: Hugh Embling, Assistant Bishop in Corea. Deaconed Advent (19 December) 1909 and priested Advent (18 December) 1910, by Arthur Winnington-Ingram (London) at St Paul's; consecrated Michaelmas (29 September) 1926, by Randall Davidson (Canterbury) at Westminster Abbey.
- 1951–1963: Arthur Chadwell, Assistant Bishop (Acting diocesan bishop, 1951–1953; deaconed 11 June 1922 and priested 27 May 1923 by Cyril Garbett (Southwark) at Southwark Cathedral; consecrated 30 November 1951 by Geoffrey Fisher (Canterbury) at Westminster Abbey)

==== External links ====
- Official website

===== Missionary Diocese of North Korea =====
- Missonary Diocese of North Korea
- Hangul: 북한선교교구
- Hanja: 北韓宣敎敎區
- RR: Bukhan seongyo gyogu
- MR: Pukhan sŏn'gyo kyogu

The Diocesan Synod of Seoul designated North Korea as a missionary diocese in 2010, but it is not registered in the Anglican Communion. The Bishop of Seoul is the ex officio Bishop of the Missionary Diocese of North Korea.

=== Diocese of Daejeon ===
- Diocese of Daejeon
- Hangul: 대전교구
- Hanja: 大田敎區
- RR: Daejeon gyogu
- MR: Taejŏn kyogu

The Diocese of Daejeon is the Anglican Church in that part of South Korea that includes Daejeon and Sejong Cities, North and South Chungcheong Provinces, North and South Jeolla Provinces and the southern part of Gangwon Province. It was erected from the Joseon diocese in 1965 and split in 1974 to erect Busan diocese.

==== Bishops of Daejeon ====
- 1965–1968: John Daly
- 1968–1974: Richard Rutt (assistant bishop since 1966)
- 1974–1987: Mark Pae Du-hwan
- 1987–2003: Paul Yun Hwan (cons. 14 Oct 1987, by Robert Runcie (Cantuar.) at Hannam University)
- 2003–2007: Andrew Shin Hyeon-sam
- 2007–2013: Michael Kwon Hee-yeon
- 2014–2023: Moses Yoo Nak-jun
- 2023-: Titus Kim Ho-uk

==== External links ====
- Official website

=== Diocese of Busan ===
- Diocese of Busan
- Hangul: 부산교구
- Hanja: 釜山敎區
- RR: Busan gyogu
- MR: Pusan kyogu

Busan diocese was erected from the Diocese of Daejeon in 1974.

==== Bishops of Busan ====
- 1974–1987: William Choi Chul-hee (cons. 1 June 1974 by Paul Lee (Seoul) at Seoul Anglican Cathedral)
- 1987–1997: Benedict Kim Jae-heon
- 1994–2000: Joseph Lee Dae-yong
- 2000–2011: Solomon Yun Jong-mo
- 2012–: Onesimus Park Dong-shin

==== External links ====
- Official website

== Archives ==
Archive materials of the Anglican Church's Korean Mission are held at the Cadbury Research Library, University of Birmingham. These include records from 1889 to 1987.

== See also ==
- List of religious groups in Korea
- Calendar of saints (Anglican Church of Korea)
- Seoul Anglican Cathedral English Mission
- Society of the Holy Cross (Korea)
- Sungkonghoe University
