= Sparkbrook and Balsall Heath East (ward) =

Sparkbrook and Balsall Heath East is an electoral ward of Birmingham City Council in the south of Birmingham, West Midlands, covering an urban area to the south of the city centre.

The ward was created in 2018 as a result of boundary changes that saw the number of wards in Birmingham increase from 40 to 69.

== Geography ==
The ward is based on Sparkbrook and the eastern areas of Balsall Heath.

== Elections ==
=== 2022 by-election ===
On 6 October 2022, a by-election was held.

- Saima Ahmed (Labour Party) – 2,410
- Shaukat Ali Khan (Liberal Democrats) – 517
- Zhor Malik (Local Conservatives) – 305
- Phil Bevin (Workers Party) – 158
- Michael John Harrison (Green Party) – 72

=== 2022 election ===
2022 Birmingham City Council election

Sparkbrook and Balsall Heath East 2022 (2)
| Party | Candidate | Votes | % | ±% |
|---|---|---|---|---|
| Labour | Mohammed Azim | 2,708 | 67.6% | |
| Labour | Shabrana Hussain | 2,417 | | |
| Conservative | Abdul Bari | 937 | 23.4% | |
| Conservative | Md Kabir | 776 | | |
| Green | Michael Harrison | 186 | 4.6% | |
| Liberal Democrats | Paul Bishop | 173 | 4.3% | |
| Liberal Democrats | Maddison Crickmay | 131 | | |
| Majority | | | | |
| Turnout | | | 25.18 | |
| Labour hold | | Swing | | |
| Labour hold | | Swing | | |

=== 2018 election ===
2018 Birmingham City Council election

Sparkbrook & Balsall Heath East 2018 (2)
| Party | Candidate | Votes | % | ±% |
|---|---|---|---|---|
| Labour | Mohammed Azim | 4,257 | 77.2 | |
| Labour | Shabrana Hussain | 3,950 | 71.6 | |
| Conservative | Abu Nowshed | 701 | 12.7 | |
| Conservative | Mohammad Sweet | 665 | 12.1 | |
| Green | Roxanne Green | 237 | 4.3 | |
| Liberal Democrats | Joynal Abedin | 201 | 3.6 | |
| Liberal Democrats | Satwinder Singh | 159 | 2.9 | |
| Majority | | 3,249 | | |
| Turnout | | 5,517 | | |
| Labour win (new seat) | | | | |
| Labour win (new seat) | | | | |
