= Wylde Green =

Coordinates: 52.533333°N 1.816667°W

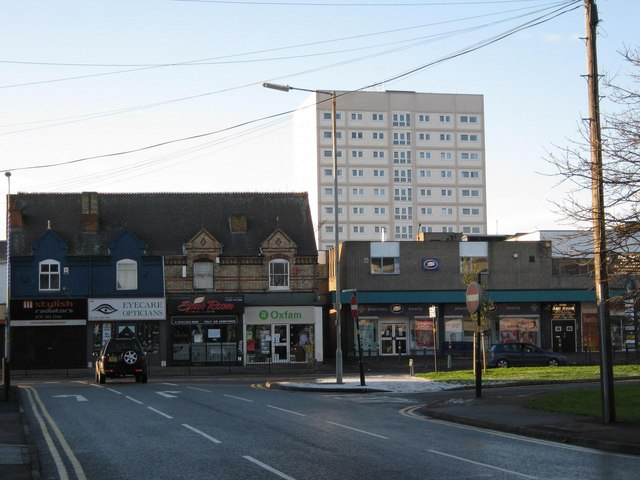
- Birmingham Road, Wylde Green

- Location within the West Midlands
- OS grid reference: SP118941
- Metropolitan borough: Birmingham
- Metropolitan county: West Midlands
- Region: West Midlands
- Country: England
- Sovereign state: United Kingdom
- Post town: SUTTON COLDFIELD
- Postcode district: B72, B73
- Post town: BIRMINGHAM
- Postcode district: B24
- Dialling code: 0121
- Police: West Midlands
- Fire: West Midlands
- Ambulance: West Midlands
- UK Parliament: Sutton Coldfield

Wylde Green is a residential area within the town of Sutton Coldfield in Birmingham, England in the West Midlands. It was historically part of Warwickshire. The area is in the Sutton Vesey ward.

== History ==
In the 16th century, this area of barren common land was known as the Wyld and was sparsely populated. After the Sutton Coldfield Inclosure Act 1824 (5 Geo. 4. c. 14 Pr.), there was some development and in 1840 the growth of the population to about 60 led to the building of the first school. In the 1850s substantial Victorian mansions began to appear along the Birmingham Road. Highbridge Road and Station Road were laid out in 1858 in anticipation of the coming of the railway. The railway with its station at Wylde Green railway station opened in 1862 (now on the Birmingham to Lichfield suburban line). Urbanisation of the area proceeded rapidly thereafter. In 1923, the parish of Wylde Green was created out of that of Boldmere.

In 1974 Sutton Coldfield, of which Wylde Green is a part, became part of the City of Birmingham. A consultative ballot in 2015 led to the formation of Royal Sutton Coldfield Town Council. The role of this organisation is the same as a parish council. Wylde Green falls under its authority.

Until recently there was a 1950s disused nuclear bunker that would have played a key role in the control of the Birmingham area in the event of a nuclear attack.

== Geography ==
Wylde Green is situated on the south side of Sutton Coldfield, bordering the Chester Road district of north Erdington, Birmingham and the Pype Hayes district to the southeast . To the north is Beeches Walk (an informal boundary between it and the Maney area that heralds the start of the town centre of Sutton Coldfield). To the south is the Chester Road crossroads, near to the Yenton Public House, beyond which is Erdington. To the east across New Hall Valley is Walmley, and on the west is Boldmere.

== Housing and facilities ==
Much of the housing dates from the 1930s, late 1940s and 1950s. Much of the area is a middle-working class suburb, with small pockets of affluence. There is one tower block located within Wylde Green, Heron Court, which is behind The Lanes Shopping Centre, which also has flats above retail floors.

Wylde Green Road, the road to Walmley, was noted for having a ford across Plants Brook until around 1967. Within the valley are New Hall Valley Country Park and Plantsbrook Nature Reserve. Also on the Wylde Green Road is a cottage which used to look over the ford. It was called the Fordkeeper's Cottage and was built by Bishop Vesey.

Wylde Green was previously served by Wylde Green library, a one-storey building that, until recently, was run by volunteers. It is located to the rear of The Lanes Shopping Centre which, along with the rest of the street, hosts the main shopping area for Wylde Green. Wylde Green Library has been cut, and Birmingham City Council blames lack of funding from the Central government. Opposite the library is Emmanuel Parish Church, a Grade II* listed building, designed by William Bidlake. The organ was produced in 1932 by Willis Organs. The church is home to one of the few remaining boys choirs and also has a well-established girls choir. Adjacent to the library is Wylde Green Primary School, opened in 1840. Another church in Wylde Green is the Wylde Green United Reformed Church, established in 1897.

== See also ==
- Emmanuel Church, Wylde Green
