= St Thomas in the Moors, Balsall Heath =

- St Thomas in the Moors, Balsall Heath
- 52°27′38.9″N 1°53′43″W
- OS grid reference: SP 07212 84765
- Location: Balsall Heath
- Country: England
- Denomination: Church of England

History
- Dedication: St Thomas
- Consecrated: 14 August 1883

Architecture
- Architect(s): Bateman and Corser
- Groundbreaking: 28 November 1870
- Demolished: c.1970

St Thomas in the Moors, Balsall Heath is a former Church of England parish church in Balsall Heath, Birmingham.

== History ==
The foundation stone was laid on 28 November 1870 by Mrs Sands Cox of Dosthill Hall in memory of Edward Townsend Cox and Jane his wife. The brass plate which covered the foundation stone cavity was inscribed with

Hunc lapidam Ædis sacræ St. Thomæ dedicate In Memoriam Edward T. Cox et Joannae conjugis Posuit Isabella Sands Cox, Kal, Nov. xxviii A.S., MDCCCLXX. T. Bateman et Corser, Arch; T. Hardwick et Fil Ædif

It was consecrated on 14 August 1883 by the Bishop of Worcester

In 1884 a parish was assigned with land taken from the parish of St Paul's Church, Balsall Heath. Part of the parish was taken in 1900 to form part of the new parish of St Patrick's Church, Bordesley

When the church was closed, the parish was split; part merged with St Mary and St Ambrose, Edgbaston and the rest with St Anne's Church, Moseley.

== Organ ==
The church contained an organ by Nicholson of Worcester. A specification of the organ can be found on the National Pipe Organ Register. When the church was closed the organ was moved to St John the Baptist's Church, Longbridge.
