= Emmanuel Church, Sparkbrook =

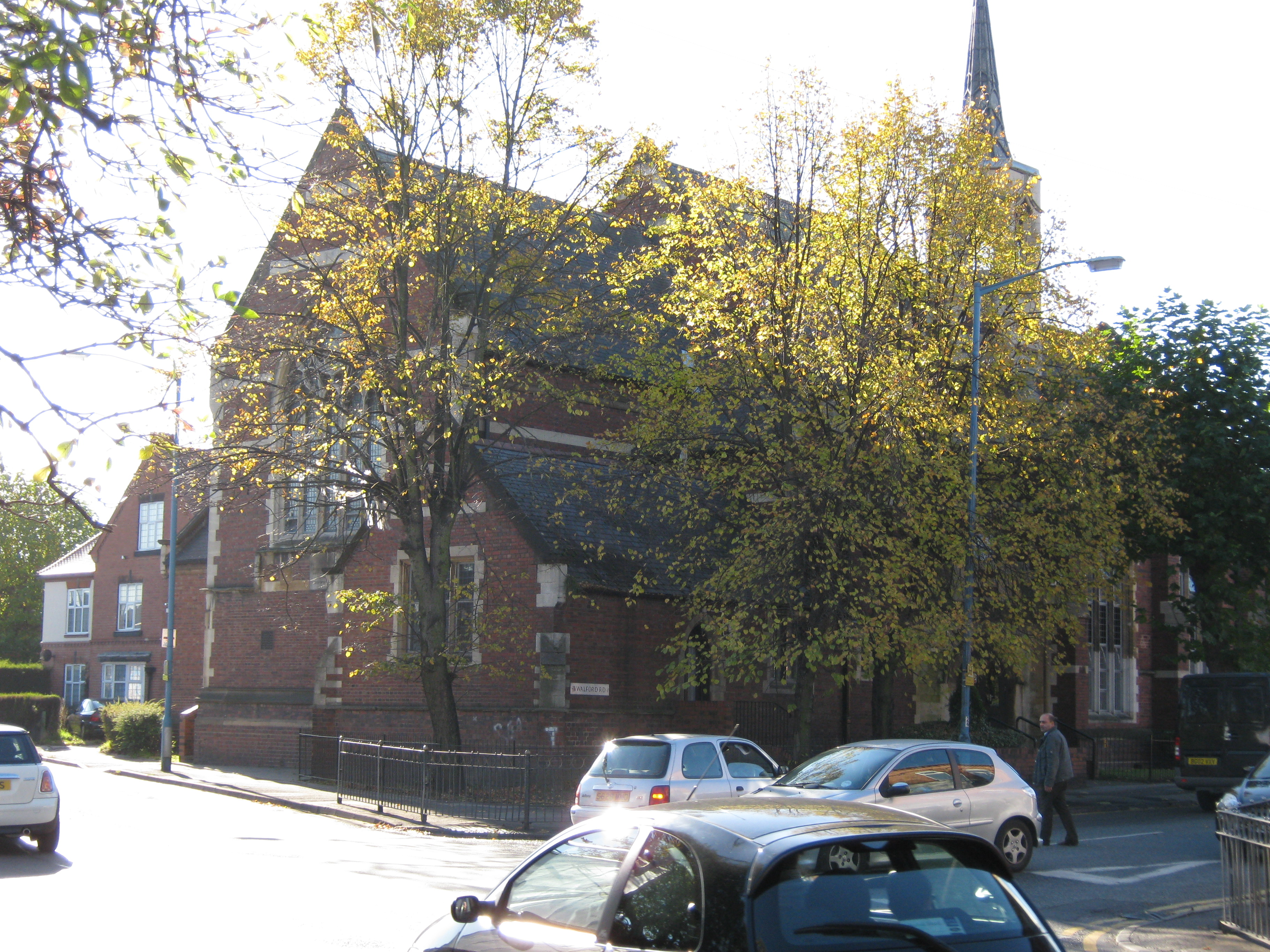
- Emmanuel Church, Sparkbrook
- Emmanuel Church, Sparkbrook
- 52°27′35.3″N 1°51′38.63″W
- OS grid reference: SP 09539 84652
- Location: Sparkbrook
- Country: England
- Denomination: Church of England

History
- Dedication: Emmanuel
- Consecrated: 1901

Architecture
- Heritage designation: Grade II listed
- Architect: William Bidlake
- Groundbreaking: 1900
- Closed: 1990

Emmanuel Church, Sparkbrook is a redundant Grade II listed parish church in the Church of England in Birmingham which has been converted to residential accommodation.

== History ==
The foundation stone was laid on 24 September 1900. The church was designed by William Bidlake and opened in 1901, and was extended in 1927. It was a chapel of ease for Christ Church, Sparkbrook until 1928 when it acquired its own parish.

Emmanuel Church was closed in 1990 and the parish merged with St John's Church, Sparkhill. The building was converted into a residential care home for elderly people, operated by the Ashram Housing Association.
