= St Cuthbert's Church, Winson Green =

St Cuthbert’s Church, Winson Green
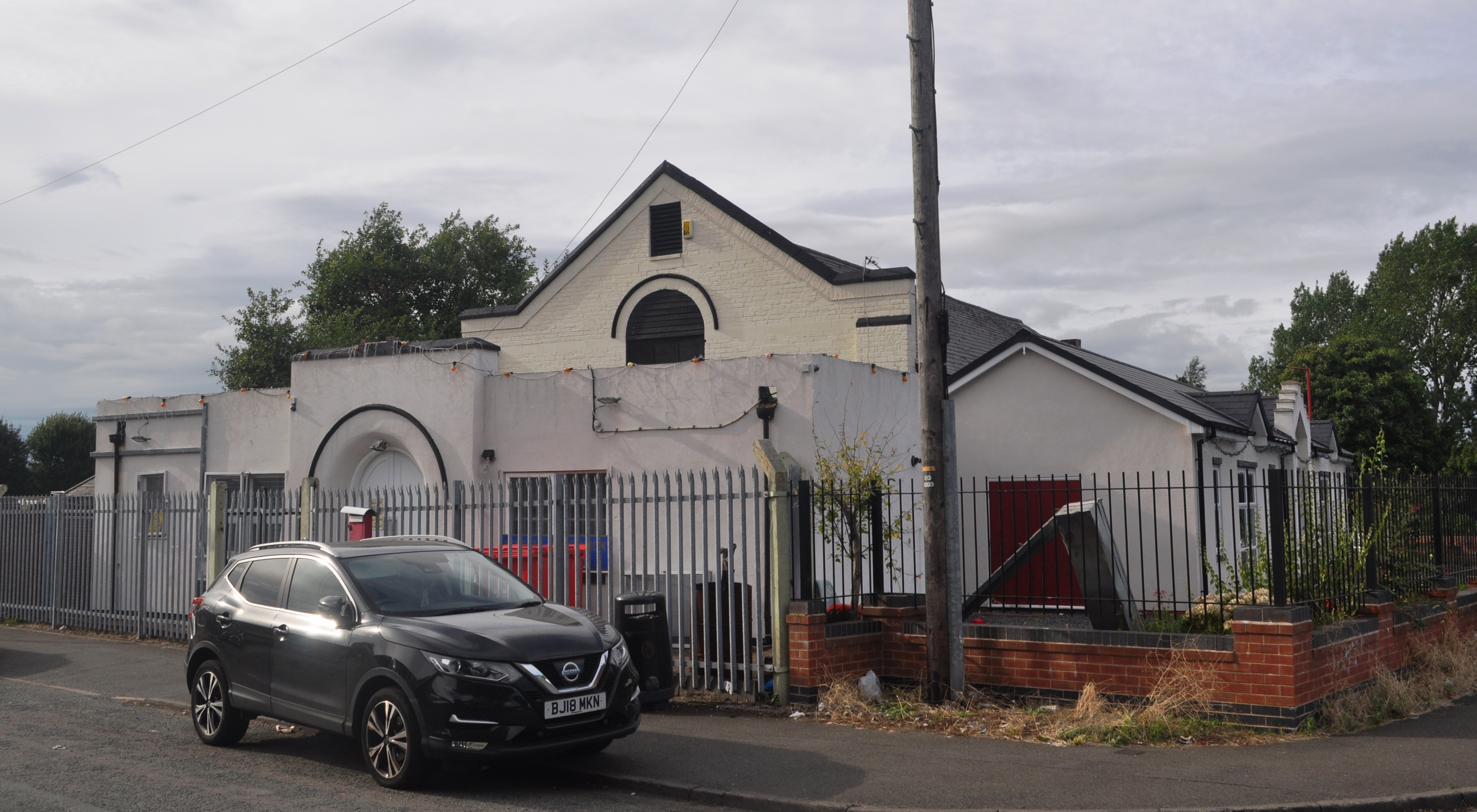
- The former church hall in August 2024
- St Cuthbert’s Church, Winson Green
- 52°29′17.4″N 1°56′18.2″W
- Location: Birmingham
- Country: England
- Denomination: Church of England

History
- Dedication: St Cuthbert
- Consecrated: 19 March 1872

Architecture
- Architect(s): Bateman and Corser
- Construction cost: £5,000
- Closed: 1960
- Demolished: 1964

Specifications
- Capacity: 720 people

St Cuthbert's Church, Winson Green is a former Church of England parish church in Birmingham.

== History ==
The church was started in 1863 as a mission from All Saints' Church, Hockley. Eventually funds were raised for a church building and it was designed by Bateman and Corser. It was consecrated on 24 October 1860 Part of the parish was taken to form a new parish of Bishop Latimer Memorial Church, Winson Green in 1904.

The church was hit by a bomb during the Second World War and despite reopening, did not last long. It was closed in 1960 and demolished in 1964. The church hall survives and is used as a Bengali community centre.

The parish was assigned back to Christ Church, Summerfield.

== Organ ==
The organ was installed by Bishop, Starr & Richardson. A specification of the organ can be found on the National Pipe Organ Register.
