= St Chrysostom's Church =

St Chrysostom's Church may refer to:

- St Chrysostom's Church, Victoria Park, Manchester, England
- St Chrysostom's Church, Hockley, Birmingham, England
