= St Agatha's Church, Sparkbrook =

Coordinates: 52.4609°N 1.8738°W

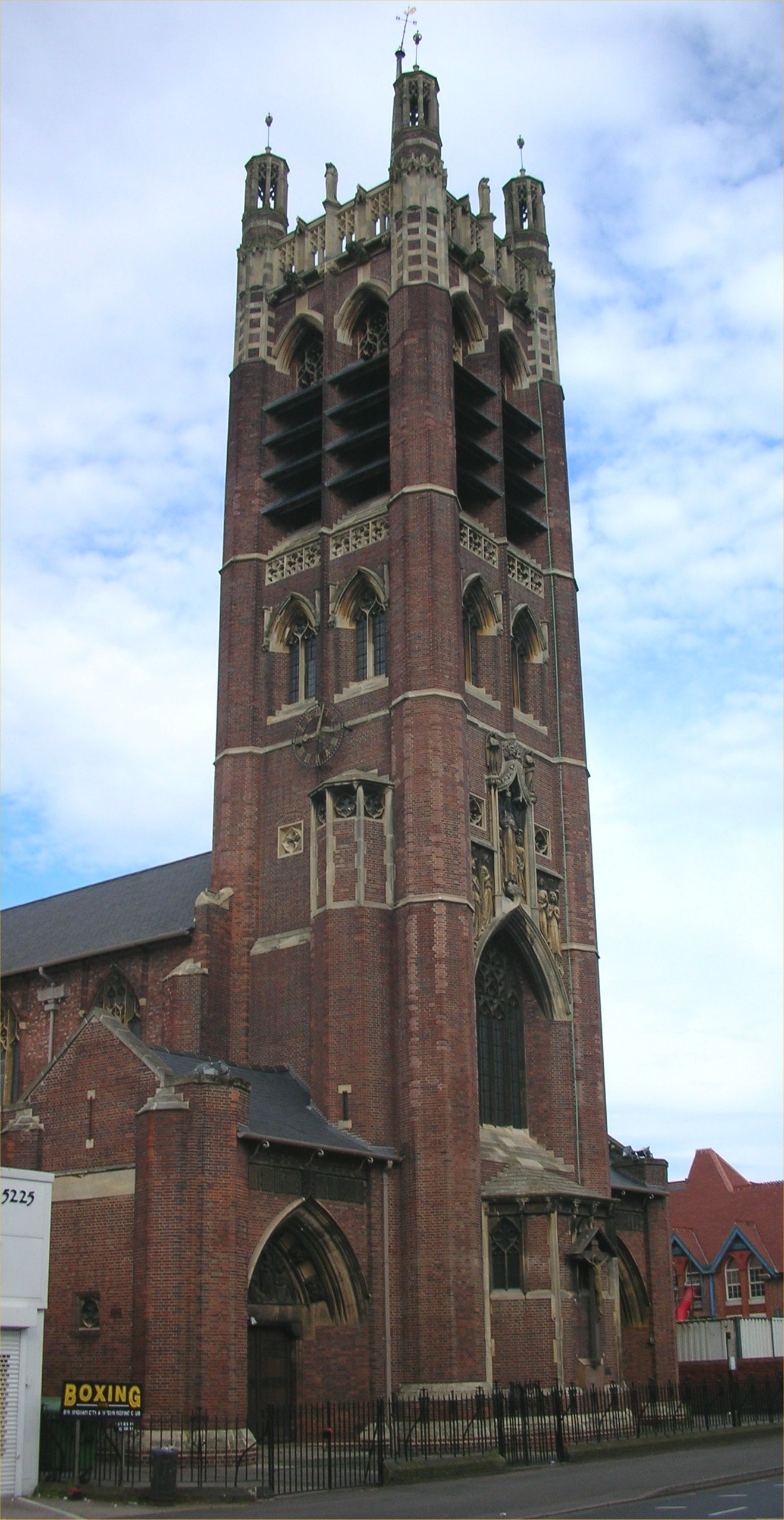
- St Agatha's Church, Sparkbrook
- OS grid reference: SP 08667 84778
- Location: Sparkbrook, Birmingham, England
- Denomination: Church of England
- Churchmanship: Anglo-Catholic
- Website: saintagathas.org.uk

Architecture
- Heritage designation: Grade I listed
- Architect: W. H. Bidlake
- Years built: October 1899 – 1901

Specifications
- Height: 36.6 metres (120 ft)

Administration
- Province: Canterbury
- Diocese: Birmingham
- Archdeaconry: Birmingham
- Deanery: Central Birmingham
- Parish: St. Agatha, Sparkbrook and St. Barnabas, Balsall Heath

Clergy
- Bishop: Rt Revd Paul Thomas SSC (AEO)
- Priest: Vacant

The Church of St Agatha is a parish church in the Church of England in Sparkbrook in Birmingham, England.

== Background ==
It was designed by W. H. Bidlake and is now a Grade I listed building.

Made of brick and decorated with stone, building started in October 1899. It was funded by the sale of the site of Christ Church, New Street which was demolished the same year to make way for shops and offices - Christchurch Buildings. That site later became Victoria Square after Christchurch Buildings were demolished in 1970. St Agatha was consecrated in 1901 by the Bishop of Worcester (Charles Gore) as Birmingham was in the diocese of Worcester until 1905 at which time Gore was made the first Bishop of Birmingham. A parish was assigned to the church in 1902 from Christ Church, Sparkbrook, and St Paul's Church, Balsall Heath. The font and only bell came from Christ Church, along with its foundation stone dated 1805. In 1959, the church hall received a licence for public worship.

The building has had an eventful history; the sanctuary end was completely destroyed by a German bomb in 1940 and the entire roof was lost in a fire in 1957. From 1940 to 1960 parts of the building were bricked off and the sense of lightness, that the interior now has, was temporarily lost.

The seven-light east chancel window was installed in 1961. Designed and made by Leonard Evetts, it depicts Jesus enthroned in Heaven surrounded by a multitude of saints and angels. In the lower righthand corner St Agatha is seen kneeling in prayer below the text and I fell at his feet and worshipped him.

The church was slightly damaged by the Birmingham Tornado on 28 July 2005. However the adjoining Ladypool Primary School was extensively damaged and lost its distinctive Martin & Chamberlain tower.

Major restoration work took place from 2002 to 2005, mostly funded by the National Heritage Lottery Board. This included the stabilisation of the tower. The restoration work was designed by Apec Architects. The restored church was officially reopened in January 2005 by Prince Edward and the Countess of Wessex.

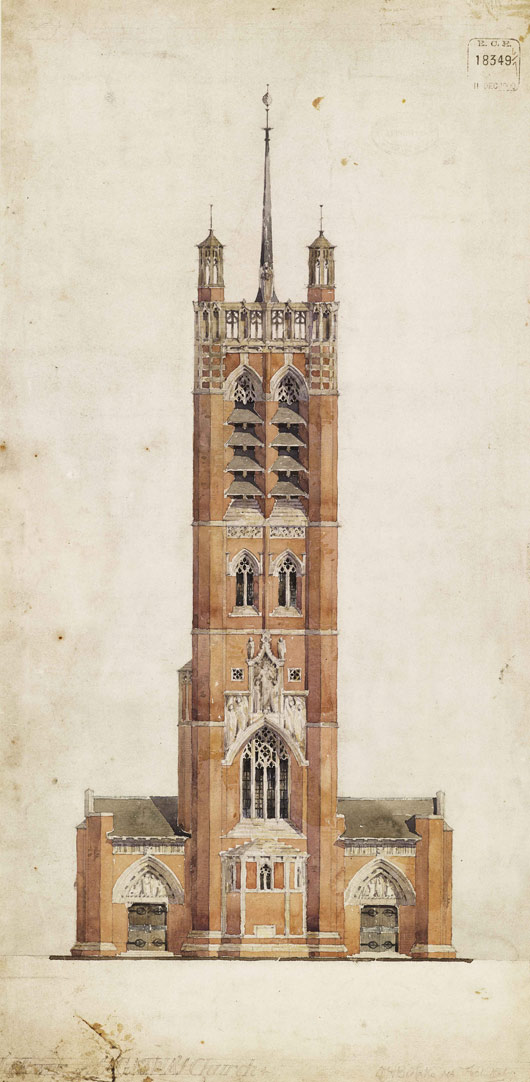

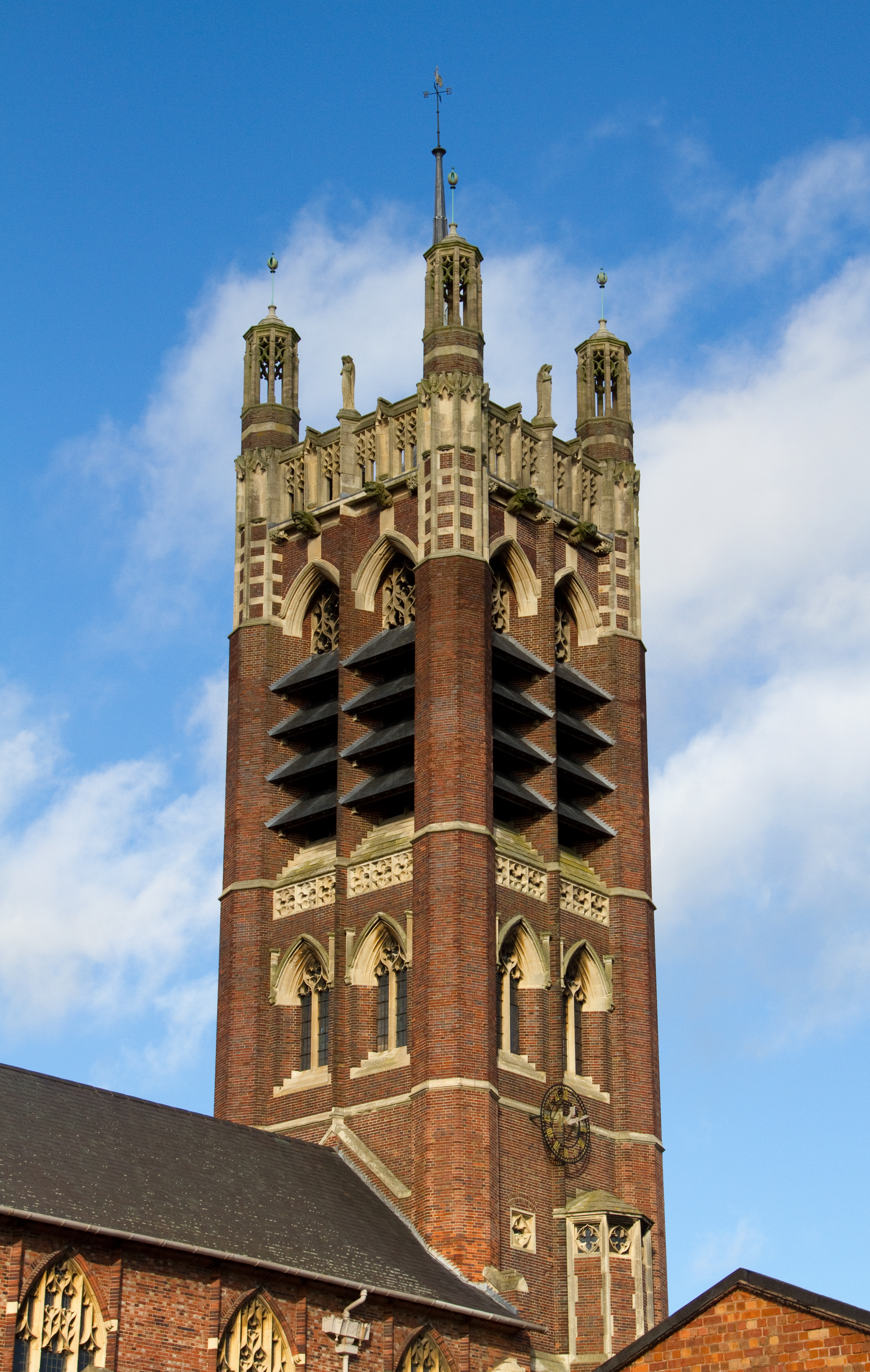

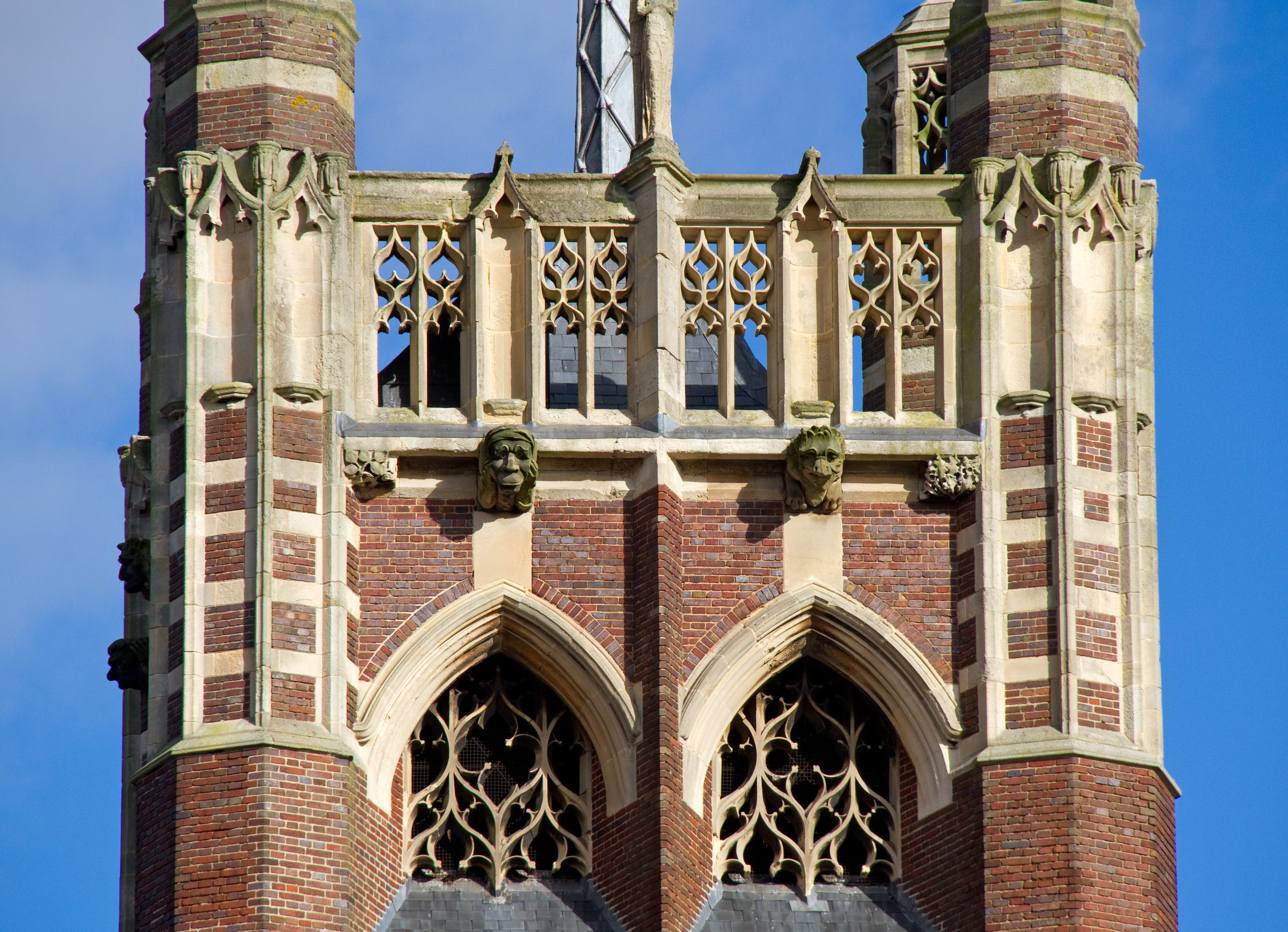

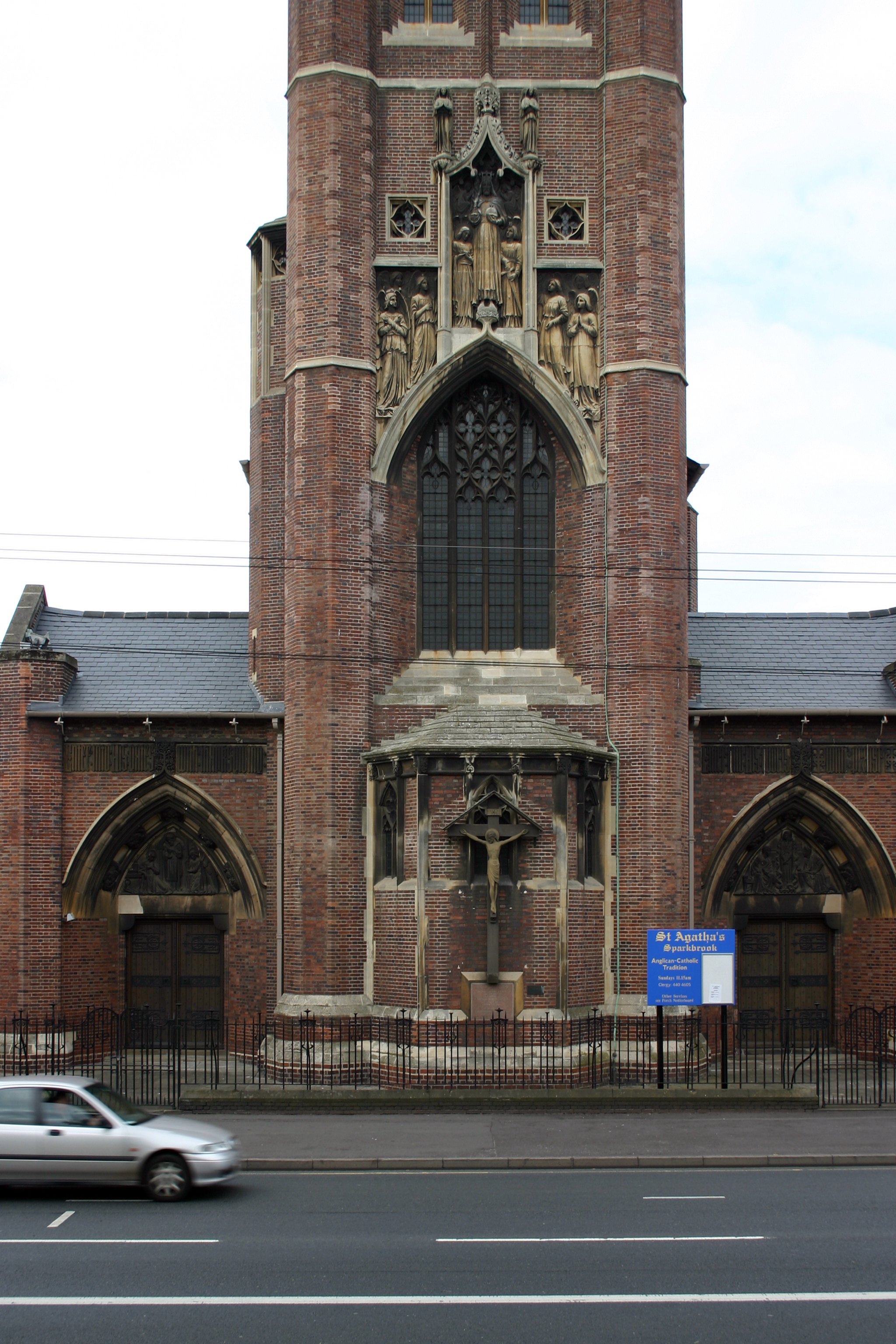

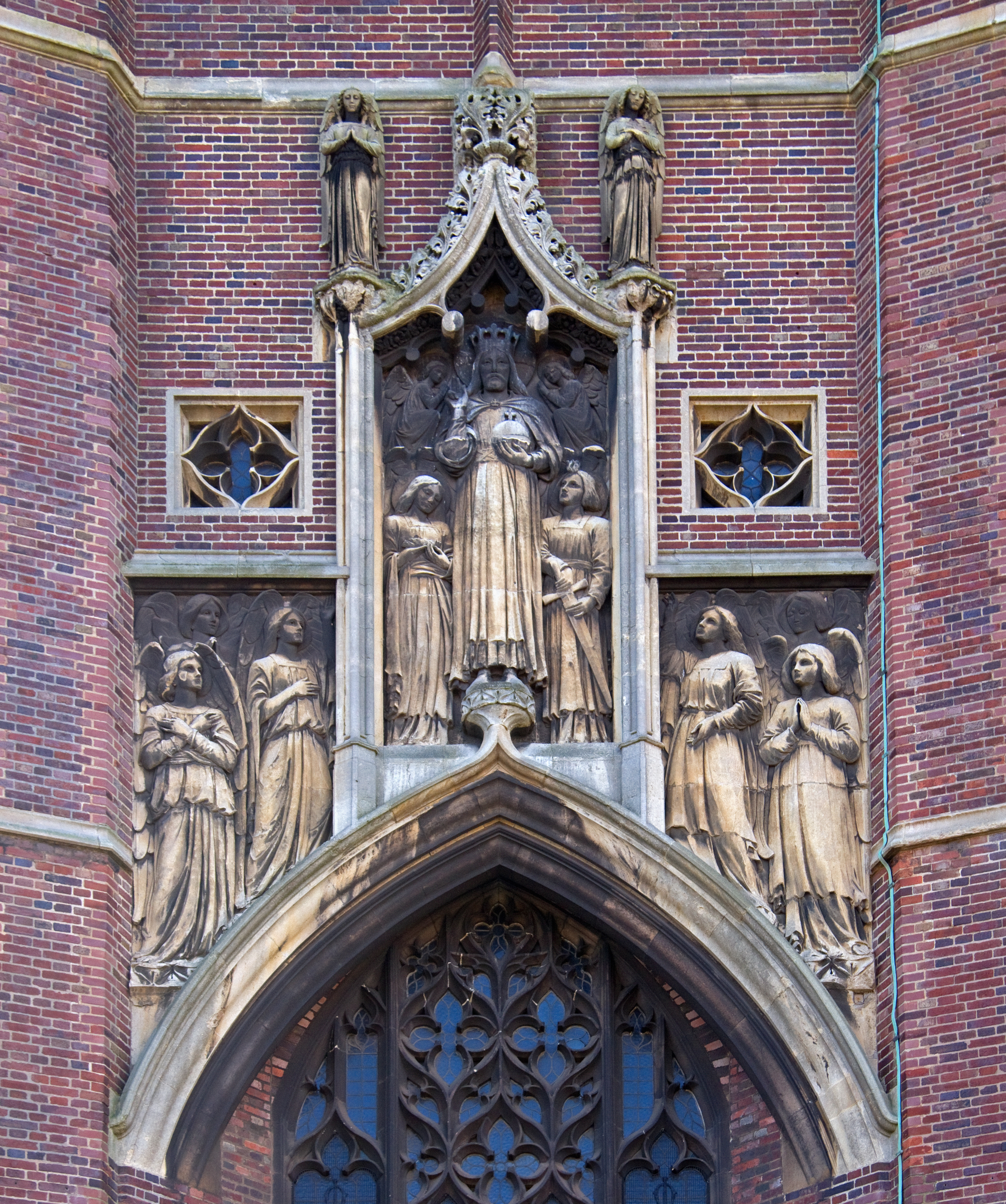

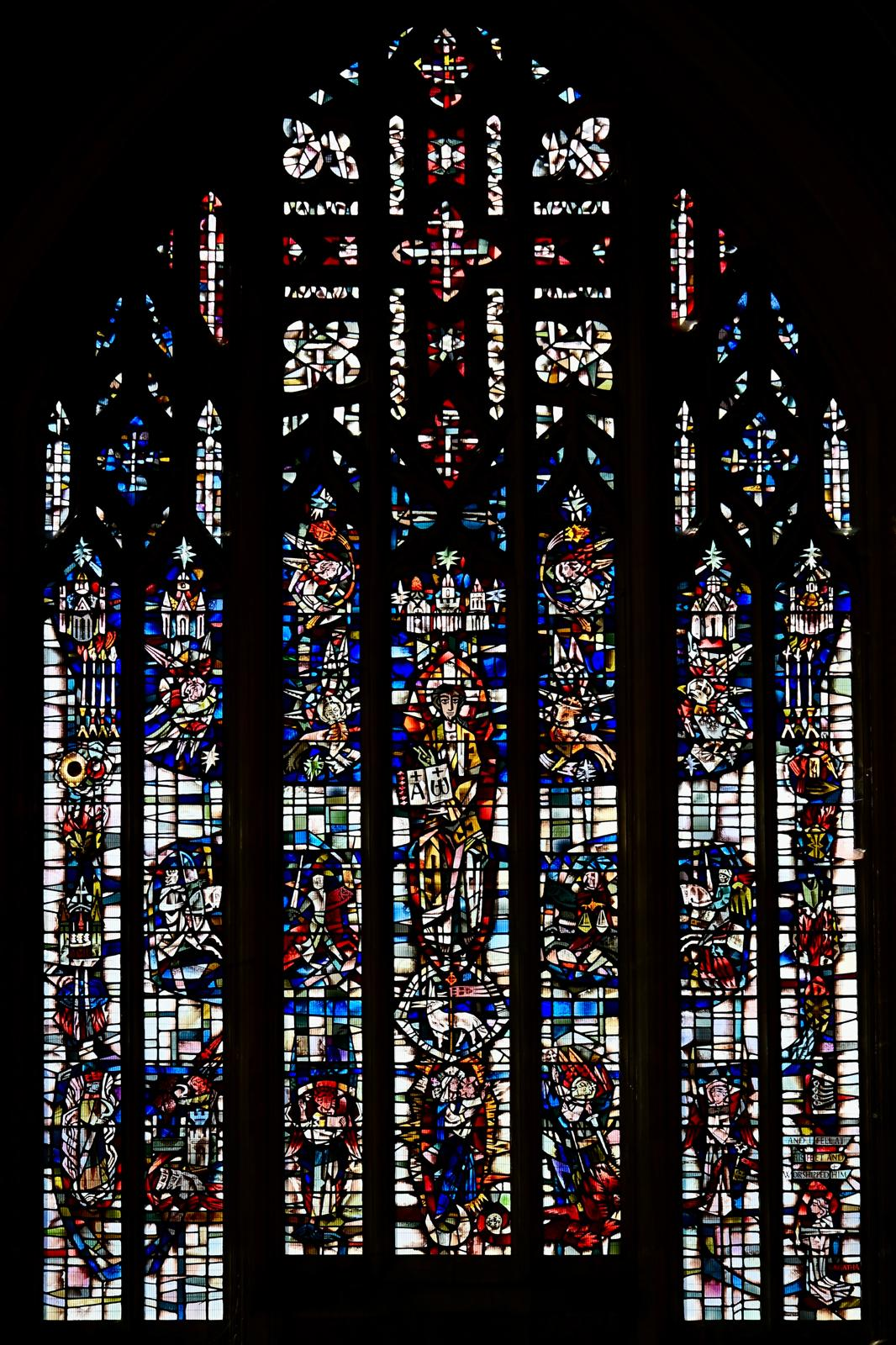

== Vicars and priests-in-charge ==
1889	Fr Charles Wilcox
1903	Fr Gerald Vacqueray
1910	Fr Thomas Sanders
1912	Fr James Talbot
1918	Fr George Rosenthal
1939	Fr Alban Tilt
1948	Fr Eric Hill
1955	Fr Bernard Hopper
1968	Fr Neville Cross
1971	Fr Frederick Bernardi
1978	Fr Leonard Boyd
1990-2014	Canon John Hervé
2016-2020	Fr John Luff
2023-2025	Fr Thomas Singh

== St Agatha's as a church ==
From its beginning St Agatha's was strongly part of the Anglo-Catholic movement. Although situated in the Diocese of Birmingham the church is under the oversight of the Bishop of Oswestry (currently Paul Thomas), the Provincial episcopal visitor and is a part of Forward in Faith. Until the 1950s there was a ring of similar churches around inner-city Birmingham - the so-called 'Biretta Belt'. Many of those churches have closed but St Agatha's itself remains open despite being in an almost entirely Muslim ward of the city. The church's priest is shared with St Barnabas' Church, Balsall Heath.

=== Music ===
The church is noted for its music - supplemented by a recently restored three-manual Nicholson organ -its liturgy and diverse congregation, and is well known beyond the parish and the city.

=== Special services ===
Celebrants have included the Archbishop of York, the Most Reverend David Hope at the centenary Mass in May 2001.

=== Facilities ===
The church hall is used by the Birmingham City Amateur Boxing Club, originally Ladywood Amateur Boxing Club, founded by Frank O'Sullivan.

== Sources ==
- All About Victoria Square, Joe Holyoak, The Victorian Society Birmingham Group, ISBN 0-901657-14-X
- St Agatha website
- British History Online: Churches built since 1800 - St Agatha, Sparkbrook, A History of the County of Warwick: Volume 7, 1964.
