= St Barnabas' Church, Balsall Heath =

St Barnabas' Church
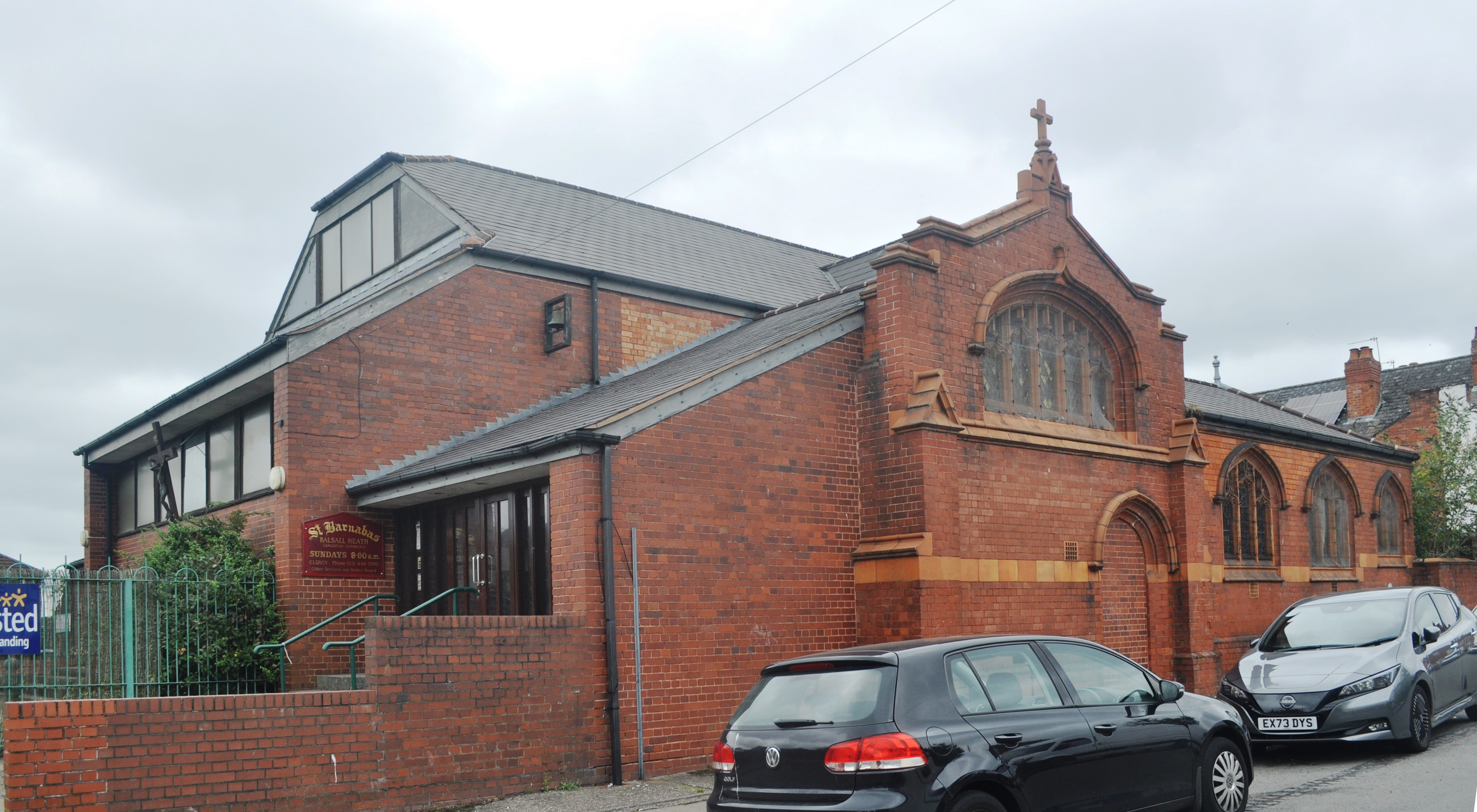
- The church in August 2024
- St Barnabas' Church
- 52°27′16.4″N 1°52′37.4″W
- OS grid reference: SP 08453 84079
- Location: Balsall Heath, Birmingham
- Country: England
- Denomination: Church of England
- Churchmanship: Anglo-Catholic
- Website: www.saintagathas.org.uk

History
- Dedication: St Barnabas
- Consecrated: 1904

Architecture
- Architect: Thomas F. Proud
- Groundbreaking: 1897
- Completed: 1904

Administration
- Diocese: Anglican Diocese of Birmingham
- Archdeaconry: Birmingham
- Deanery: Central Birmingham
- Parish: St Agatha Sparkbrook and St Barnabas Balsall Heath

Clergy
- Bishop: Rt Revd Paul Thomas SSC (AEO)

St Barnabas' is a parish church in the Church of England in Balsall Heath, Birmingham, England.

== History ==
The church was built between 1898 and 1904 according to designs made by architect Thomas Proud. The structure was consecrated by Charles Gore, Bishop of Worcester on Saturday 10 June 1904. It acquired its own parish in 1905, with land taken from St Paul's Church, Balsall Heath.

A fire in 1970 resulted in an extensive rebuilding. In 1990, the church was merged with St Agatha's Church, Sparkbrook to form a united parish. The parish stands in the Anglo-Catholic tradition of the Church of England—such as the rejection of the ordination of women in priestly service. The church receives an alternative episcopal oversight from the Bishop of Oswestry (currently Paul Thomas).
