= Emmanuel Church, Wylde Green =

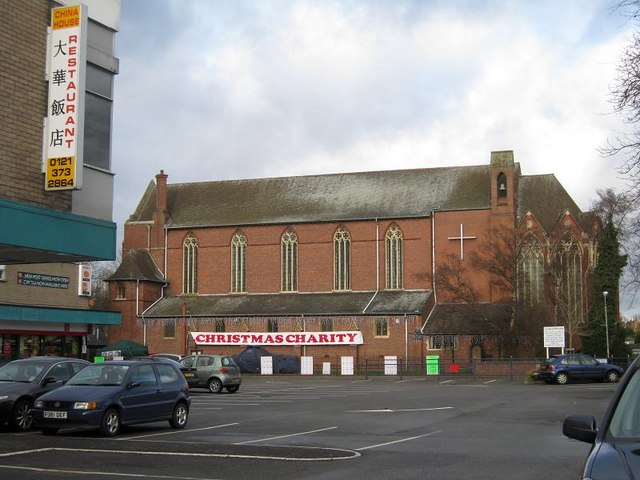
- Emmanuel Church, Wylde Green
- Emmanuel Church, Wylde Green
- 52°32′16.6″N 1°49′37.79″W
- OS grid reference: SP 11825 93352
- Location: Wylde Green
- Country: England
- Denomination: Church of England
- Website: emmanuelwyldegreen.org.uk

Architecture
- Architect: William Bidlake
- Groundbreaking: 1909
- Completed: 1926

Administration
- Province: Canterbury
- Diocese: Birmingham
- Archdeaconry: Aston
- Deanery: Aston and Sutton Coldfield
- Parish: Wylde Green

Emmanuel Church, Wylde Green is a Grade II* listed parish church in the Church of England in Wylde Green, Birmingham.

== History ==
The church was built between 1909 and 1926 to designs by the architect William Bidlake. The nave and aisles were complete before the First World War. Completion of the chancel was delayed until after the war, and was finished around 1926.

The original designs included a crossing tower and transepts, but these were not completed. A lady chapel and parish hall were added in 1967.

== Organ ==
The Willis organ dates from 1932 and was originally in the Seventh Church of Christ Scientist, South Kensington. When it was moved to Wylde Green, Stephen Bicknell designed a Gothic case with an attractive swept gabled centre. A specification of the organ can be found on the National Pipe Organ Register.
