= Percy Bullock =

English cricketer

Cricket information
- Batting: Right-handed
- Bowling: Slow left arm orthodox

Career statistics
Competition	First-class
Matches	3
Runs scored	11
Batting average	2.20
100s/50s	0/0
Top score	9
Catches/stumpings	3/–
- Source: CricInfo, 14 April 2023

Percy George Bullock (28 August 1893 – 1 December 1986) was an English cricketer who played three first-class matches for Worcestershire in 1921. He was not successful, scoring 2, 0, 9, 0 and 0 in his five innings for the county. He never bowled at first-class level.

Bullock was born in Balsall Heath, which at the time of his birth was in Worcestershire. He died aged 93 in Wythall, also in Worcestershire; he was at the time of his death the oldest surviving cricketer for the county.
