= St Paul's Church, Balsall Heath =

St Paul’s Church, Balsall Heath
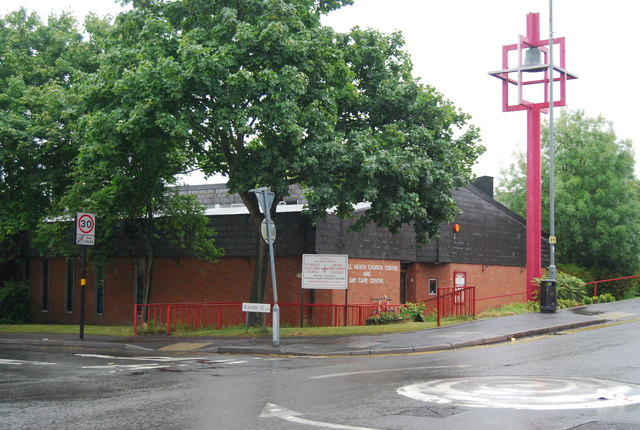
- St Paul’s Church, Balsall Heath
- 52°27′27.98″N 1°53′31.5″W
- OS grid reference: SP 07429 84428
- Location: Balsall Heath
- Country: England
- Denomination: Church of England
- Churchmanship: Liberal Anglo-Catholic

History
- Dedication: St Paul

Architecture
- Architect: Hinton Brown Langstone
- Groundbreaking: 1979
- Completed: 1980

Administration
- Diocese: Anglican Diocese of Birmingham
- Archdeaconry: Birmingham
- Deanery: Moseley
- Parish: Balsall Heath and Edgbaston

St Paul's Church, Balsall Heath is a parish church in the Church of England in Birmingham.

== History ==
The foundation stone for the first church building was laid on 17 May 1852 by Mrs Taylor, and construction started to designs by James Lyndon Pedley. The building opened for worship when it was consecrated on Tuesday 17 May 1853 by the Bishop of Worcester, and cost £5,500 to construct. A parish was assigned out of St Nicolas' Church, Kings Norton in 1853.

The church was enlarged in 1856 and again in 1865 by Edward Holmes.

From St Paul's parish, land was taken to form other new churches in Birmingham, including St Thomas in the Moors, Balsall Heath in 1884, St Patrick's Church, Bordesley in 1900, St Agatha's Church, Sparkbrook in 1902 and St Barnabas' Church, Balsall Heath in 1905.

In the 1970s the congregation were unable to afford the upkeep, and together with the Church of Christ United Reform Church, built a new building. In 1979 construction started on a new church by architects Hinton Brown Langstone and this was consecrated in 1980 by Bishop Hugh Montefiore.

== Organ ==
The church contained an organ by Henry Willis which was installed 1880. A specification of the organ can be found on the National Pipe Organ Register. When the church closed in 1979, the organ was sold to St George's Church, Battery Point, Hobart, Tasmania.

=== Organists ===
- John Heywood 1866-1915
