= Ladypool Primary School =

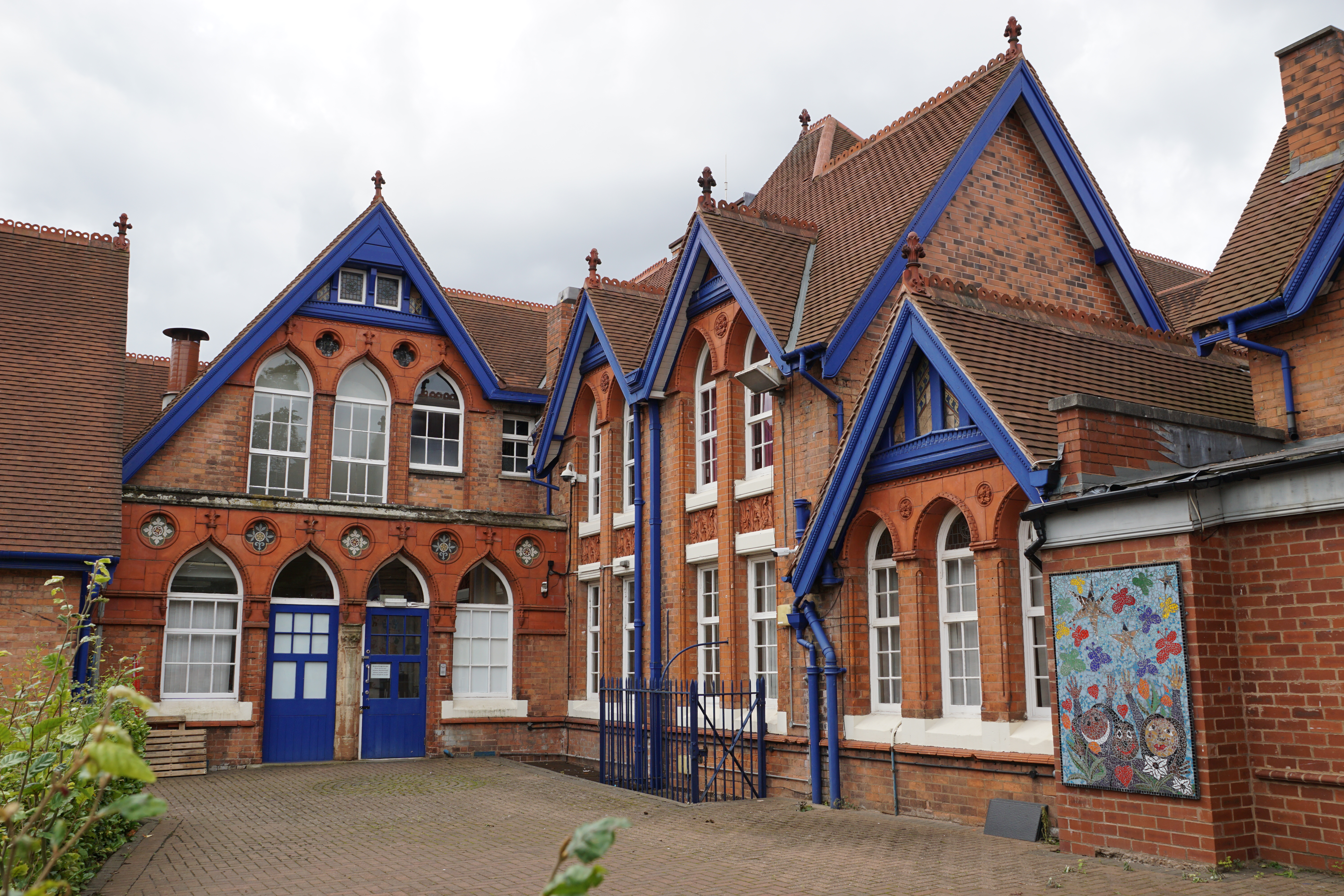
- Entrance of school

Location
- Stratford Road, Sparkbrook; Birmingham, West Midlands, B11 1QT; England
- Coordinates: 52.4612°N 1.8742°W

Information
- Former name: Stratford Road School
- Type: Community school
- Established: 1885; 141 years ago
- Local authority: Birmingham City Council
- Department for Education URN: 103265 Tables
- Ofsted: Reports
- Head teacher
- Gender: Mixed
- Age range: 3–11
- Enrolment: 411 (2019)
- Capacity: 420
- Website: www.ladypool.bham.sch.uk

Ladypool Primary School (formerly Stratford Road School) is a 3–11 mixed, community primary school in Sparkbrook, Birmingham, West Midlands, England. It is a Grade II* listed building, and stands next to St Agatha's Church.

== History ==
It was built as Stratford Road School in 1885 by architects Martin & Chamberlain as a Birmingham board school, one of around forty schools built by that firm in an innovative style as a result of the Elementary Education Act 1870.

The school was extensively damaged by the Birmingham tornado on 28 July 2005 and lost its distinctive Martin & Chamberlain tower. The school proposed building a replica of the tower. On 26 October 2006, Birmingham City Council Planning Department decided that the planning application should be referred to the Department for Communities and Local Government.

== Gallery ==
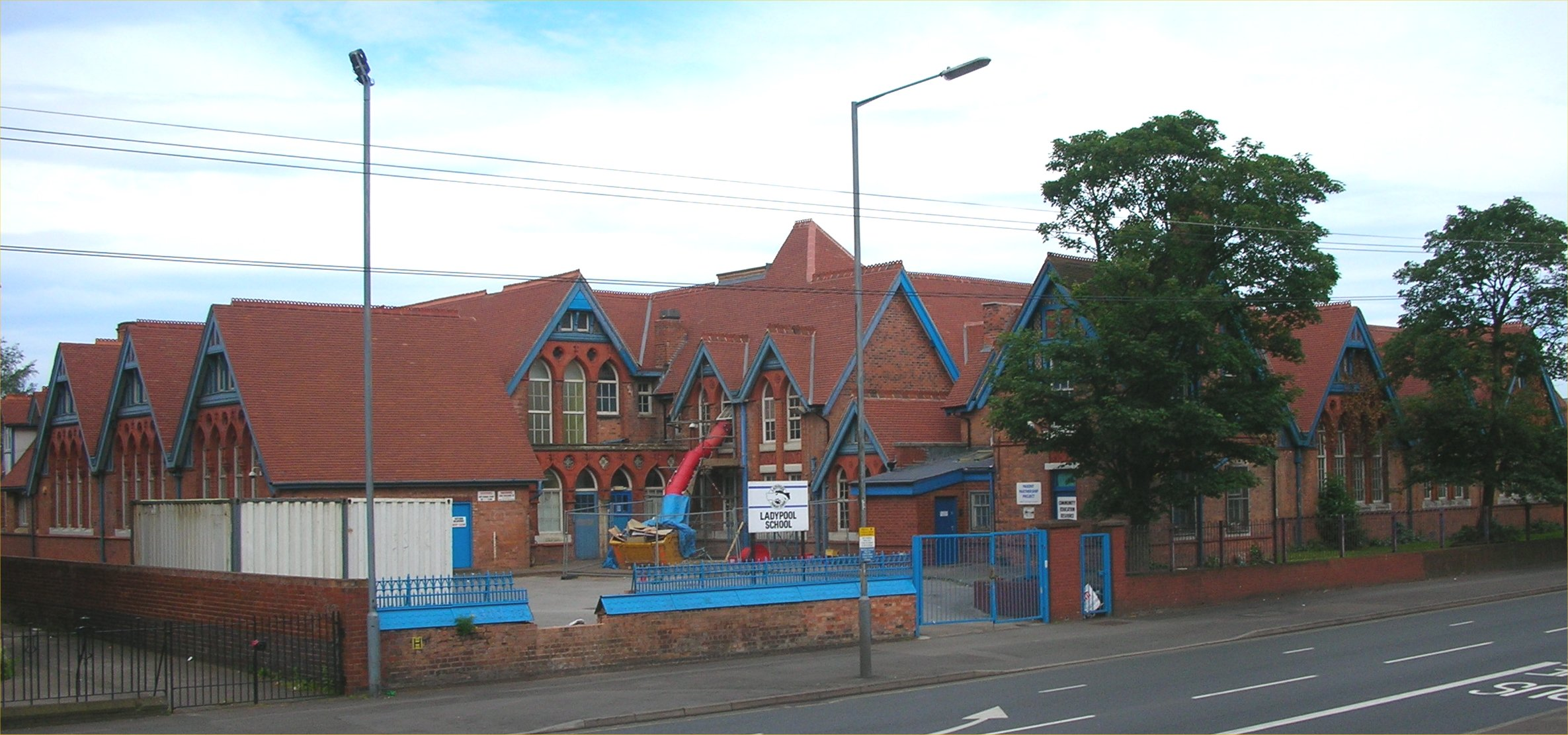
Post-tornado view of school without tower.
