= Celestino Pancheri =

British artist

Celestino Enrico Pancheri
- Born: 1881; Italy
- Died: 21 November 1961; Bromsgrove
- Known for: Sculpture

Celestino Enrico Pancheri (ca. 1881 – 21 November 1961) was an Italian sculptor and carver who worked in Bromsgrove, Worcestershire.

He was born in Italy but came to England to work for the Bromsgrove Guild of Applied Arts at the end of the 19th century. He settled in Bromsgrove and in partnership with Mr Hack, managed to buy the Old Coach House, setting up their own business Pancheri and Hack, around 1920.

Celestino Pancheri married Florence Gibbs in 1911. Their son, Robert followed his father into the trade, and the business was called Pancheri and Son.

== Robert Pancheri ==
Robert Pancheri (22 June 1916 – 1996) was educated at Bromsgrove School, saw service as a Captain in the Cheshire Regiment in the Second World War and was a lay preacher. On his father's death, he inherited the business.

== Works ==
- St Godwald's Church, Finstall. Reredos 1924.
- Bromsgrove School Memorial Chapel. Reredos. 1930
- Holy Trinity and St Mary's Church, Dodford. Woodcarving incl. Organ Case 1936
- St Mary and All Saints' Church, Kidderminster. Oak Screen 1946
- St Denys’ Church, Severn Stoke. War Memorial Screen 1946
- St Godwald's Church, Finstall Memorial to the Normandy landings 1946
- St Mary the Virgin, Hanbury Royal Arms of Queen Elizabeth II 1954
- St James' Church, Blakedown. Lectern 1954
- St John the Baptist's Church, Suckley. Sanctuary fittings. 1956
- St John the Baptist's Church, Longbridge. Carved statues in the west window. 1957
- St Saviour's Church, West Hagley. Angel Lectern 1959
- St Mary's Church, Elmbridge. Chancel alterations. 1960 - 1961
- St Stephen's Church, Worcester. West screen. 1961
- St Bartholomew's Church, Tardebigge. Pulpit. 1965
- St John the Baptist's Church, Wolverley. Lectern 1965
- St Peter's Church, Inkberrow. Vestry Screen. 1970
- St John the Baptist's Church, Feckenham. Reredos 1971
- St John the Baptist Church, Bromsgrove. Organ Screen 1969 - 1970
- St John the Baptist Church, Bromsgrove. Statue of St John the Baptist. 1973
- Memorial porch for Charles Tertius Mander at St Peter's Church, Wolverhampton
