= Gas Street Longbridge =

- St John the Baptist's Church, Longbridge
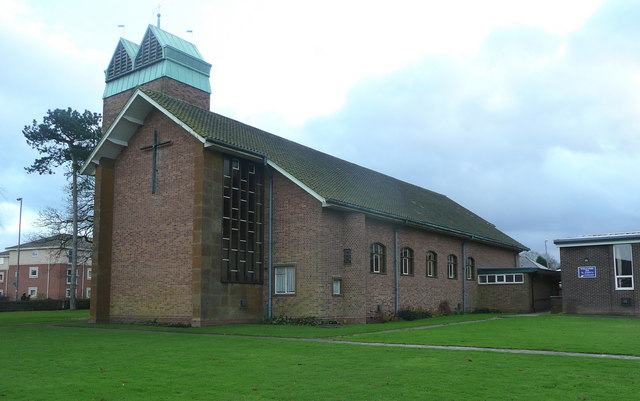
- Gas Street Longbridge
- Gas Street Longbridge
- 52°23′41.59″N 1°58′30.96″W
- OS grid reference: SP 01682 77472
- Location: Longbridge
- Country: England
- Denomination: Church of England
- Churchmanship: Charismatic Evangelical
- Website: https://gasstreet.church/longbridge

History
- Dedication: St John the Baptist
- Consecrated: 1957

Architecture
- Architect: G H While
- Groundbreaking: 1956
- Completed: 1957

Administration
- Diocese: Anglican Diocese of Birmingham
- Archdeaconry: Birmingham
- Deanery: Kings Norton
- Parish: Longbridge

Clergy
- Vicar: Rev. Tim Hughes
- Pastor: James Leavy

Gas Street Longbridge is a parish church in the Church of England in Birmingham.

== History ==
The church was designed by G H While of Bromilow, While and Smeaton. The church was consecrated in 1957 and a parish was formed from St Nicolas' Church, Kings Norton at the same time. It was built to serve the expanding car-making area around the Longbridge plant.

The church is noted for five oak statues on the mullions of the west window designed by G H While and carved by the Robert Pancheri of Bromsgrove. The central figure is of St John the Baptist holding a cross, with a lamb lying on the Bible. Around him are depictions of Elijah with a raven, Isaiah with a branch, Ezekiel with a wheel and Jeremiah with a scroll.

The church was used by the architect as a model for St Boniface's Church, Quinton which was built 2 years later.

In 2024, Gas Street relaunched St John as Gas Street Longbridge. The building has undergone revitalisation, and substantial investment has been put into it since.

== Organ ==
A two manual organ from St Thomas in the Moors, Balsall Heath was installed in 1958 by Nicholson and Co of Worcester. A specification of the organ can be found on the National Pipe Organ Register.
