= St John's Church, Sparkhill =

Church in Birmingham, England

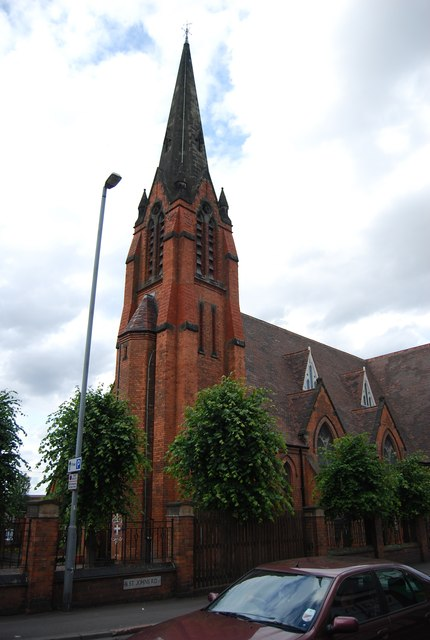
- St John's Church, Sparkhill
- 52.45418°N 1.86575°W
- Denomination: Church of England
- Churchmanship: Low church
- Website: www.stjohnsparkhill.org.uk

History
- Dedication: St. John the Evangelist

Administration
- Province: Canterbury
- Diocese: Birmingham
- Archdeaconry: Aston
- Deanery: Yardley & Bordesley
- Parish: Sparkhill

Clergy
- Vicar: Toby Crowe (2021)

St John's Church is an Anglican church in Sparkhill Birmingham.

St John's is a welcoming multi-ethnic church situated in the heart of Birmingham's Balti Belt, it is one of England's most ethnically and religiously diverse parishes. The main Sunday service is held at 10.30am, the first Sunday of the month being an All Age Service followed by a shared meal for those who wish to stay.

The church is a member of the South Asian Forum of the Evangelical Alliance and the New Wine Network of churches.

The Church hosts the Armenian Church in Birmingham and a Persian-speaking congregation.

It is the home of the charity 'Narthex Sparkhill' www.narthex.org.uk which received the Queen's Award for Voluntary Service in 2016.

It was constructed in 1888 which makes it one year older than Birmingham city. It sits exactly at the top of the Hill known as Sparkhill. It is a Grade II listed building.

"St John's Church is a remarkable Victorian building with an interior of vast proportions for its age... The church was built in 1888 by Birmingham architects Martin & Chamberlain. This firm was more famous for school buildings than churches, and most notably the Birmingham School of Art, one of the finest buildings in the city centre. St John's church is perhaps as bold an architectural statement, in its own way...The architectural style of the exterior is the Victorian version of Early English Gothic, but with c19 engineering advances displaying no further similarities to the medieval in its interior arrangement." (English Heritage report 2009)

In 1990 with the closure of Emmanuel Church, Sparkbrook part of that parish was incorporated within this parish.
