= Bishop Latimer Memorial Church, Winson Green =

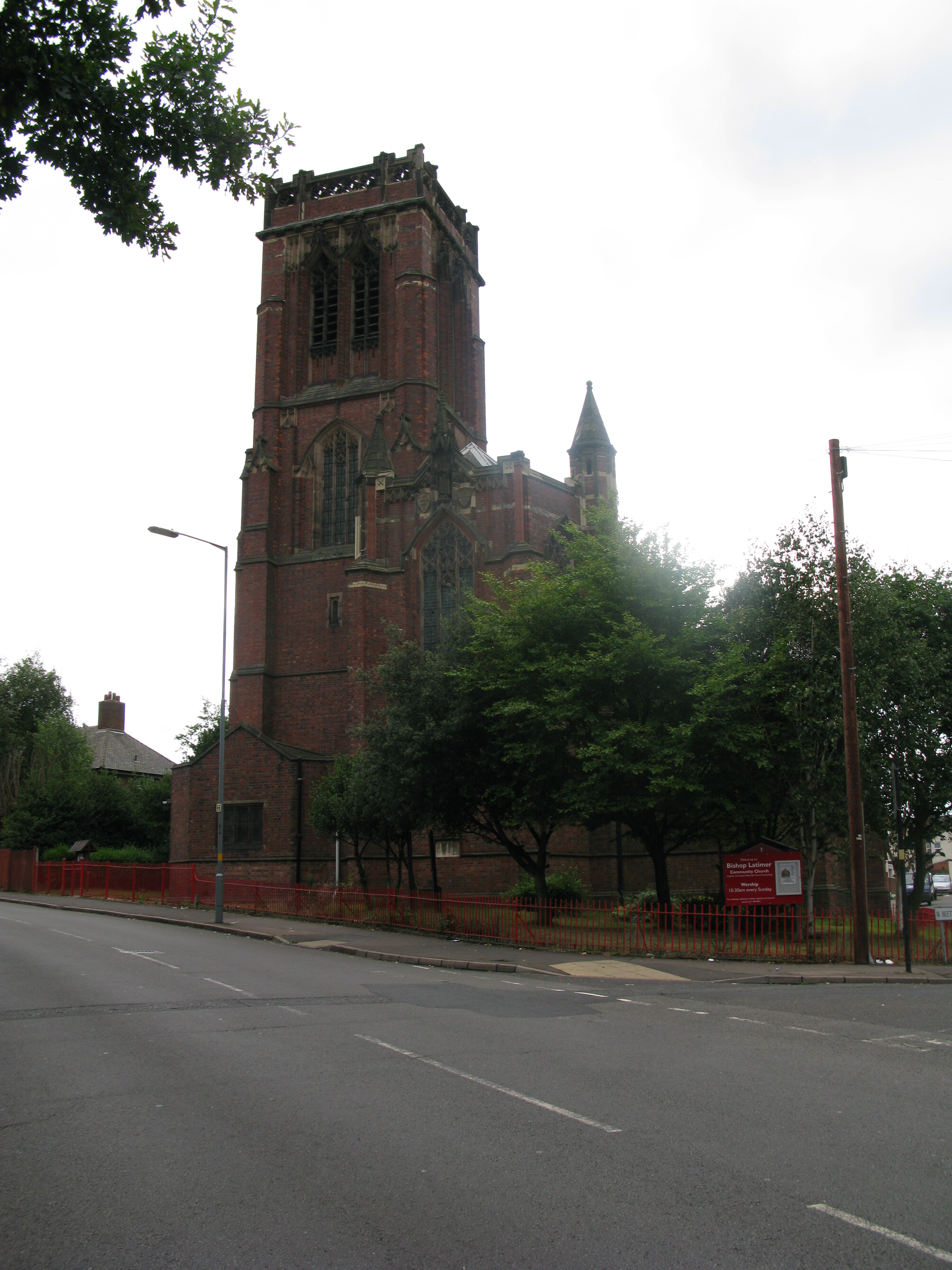
- Bishop Latimer Memorial Church, Winson Green
- Bishop Latimer Memorial Church, Winson Green
- 52°29′49″N 1°56′23″W
- OS grid reference: SP 04184 88792
- Location: Winson Green
- Country: England
- Denomination: Church of England

History
- Dedication: Hugh Latimer
- Consecrated: 1904

Architecture
- Heritage designation: Grade II* listed
- Architect: William Bidlake
- Groundbreaking: 1903
- Completed: 1904

Specifications
- Length: 168 feet (51 m)
- Width: 46 feet (14 m)
- Height: 120 feet (37 m)

Administration
- Diocese: Birmingham
- Archdeaconry: Birmingham
- Deanery: Handsworth
- Parish: Bishop Latimer with All Saints, Birmingham

Bishop Latimer Memorial Church, Winson Green (now known as Winson Green SDA Church) is a Grade II* listed parish church in the Church of England in Winson Green, Birmingham. In 2015 the building changed ownership and is now owned and managed by the Seventh-day Adventist Church.

== History ==
The funding for the church was anonymous. It was designed by the architect William Bidlake in the Gothic style and consecrated in 1904.

The parish was assigned out of St Cuthbert’s Church, Winson Green and St Chrysostom’s Church, Hockley in 1904.

There was a major restoration in 1938.

== Bells ==
The eight bells installed in 1958 were of 1776 by Robert Wells, and were formerly in St John's Church, Deritend. They were moved to St John’s Church, Perry Barr in 1972.

== Parish status ==
The church is now known as Bishop Latimer United Church and is in a local ecumenical partnership between the Anglican Church and the United Reformed Church in Winson Green.

== Organ ==
The church has a two manual pipe organ dating by James Jepson Binns. A specification of the organ can be found on the National Pipe Organ Register.
