= Mortuary Chapel, Handsworth Cemetery =

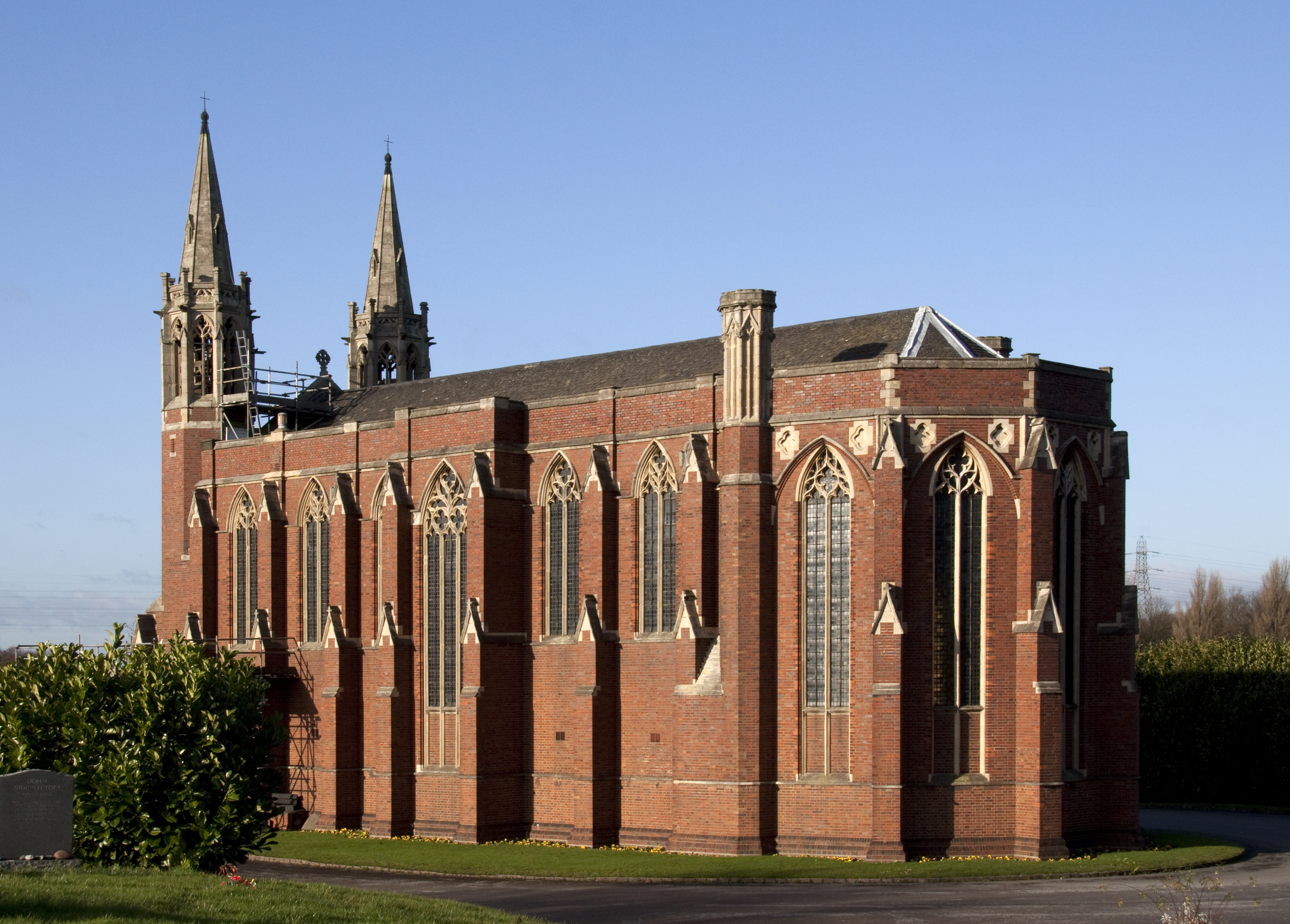
- Mortuary Chapel, Handsworth Cemetery
- Mortuary Chapel, Handsworth Cemetery
- 52°30′59.48″N 1°57′24.83″W
- OS grid reference: SP 02954 90731
- Location: Handsworth, Birmingham
- Country: England
- Denomination: Church of England

History
- Consecrated: 1910

Architecture
- Heritage designation: Grade I listed
- Architect: William Bidlake
- Groundbreaking: 1909
- Completed: 1910

Administration
- Diocese: Birmingham
- Archdeaconry: Birmingham
- Deanery: Handsworth

Mortuary Chapel, Handsworth Cemetery is a Grade I listed chapel in the Church of England in Handsworth, Birmingham, England.

== History ==
It was designed by the architect William Bidlake in the Arts and Crafts style. Work started in 1909, and it was consecrated in 1910.

The condition of the chapel deteriorated and English Heritage put it on their Buildings at Risk register.

In 2012 English Heritage awarded £375,000 toward the restoration of the chapel. Birmingham City Council, who operate the cemetery, contributed another £325,000.
