= 1931 Birmingham tornado =

Strong tornado in the British Isles

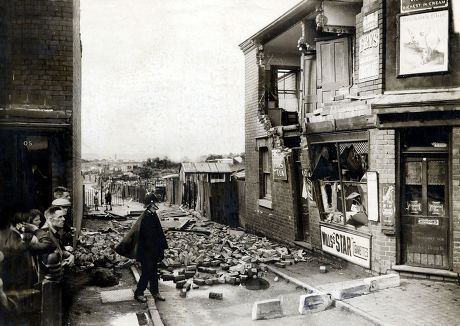
- Damage to businesses following the tornado

Meteorological history
- Date: 14 June 1931

F3 tornado
- on the Fujita scale

T7 tornado
- on the TORRO scale
- Highest winds: 165 mph (266 km/h)

Overall effects
- Fatalities: 1
- Injuries: 10+
- Damage: £40,000-50,000
- Areas affected: Birmingham

On the evening of 14 June 1931, a deadly F3 tornado moved through the southern and eastern suburbs of Birmingham, England, killing 1 person and injuring at least 10 others. The tornado caused significant damage along a 10-kilometre (6.2 mi) path.

== Meteorological synopsis ==
On 14 June 1931, a complex area of low pressure was situated over the British Isles, with two low pressure centers, one situated over the southern coast, and one over the Midlands, funnelling warm air over the British Isles.

Throughout the day, thunderstorm development across England was rampant: A man lost his life in Newcastle upon Tyne after being struck by lightning, hail up to 50mm in diameter fell at Salisbury Plain, and many locations received rain totals in excess of 20 millimetres (2.0 cm) notably in Hall Green, Birmingham, where almost 25 millimetres (2.5 cm) of rain fell in the hour before the tornado struck.

Severe flooding occurred across much of England, particularly in Birmingham, where the western side of the city suffered much damage when the rivers Rea and Bourne overflowed. Lightning struck a house in Kings Heath, injuring the occupants.

The mean temperature for England in June 1931 was 14.4 °C (57.9 °F), slightly above average.

== Tornado summary ==
At around 4PM BST, a tornado developed in the Hall Green district of Birmingham, first causing damage to Southam Road and Cole Bank Road, where tiles were stripped from roofs, windows were broken, and fences and outbuildings were destroyed. At the top of Sarehole Road, several trees were uprooted.

Travelling northward, the tornado intensified as it entered Sparkhill. At Formans Road, entire terraces were unroofed, some suffering collapses of gable walls, and in some instances, the upper storeys of homes were destroyed. The sole fatality of the tornado occurred here, when a collapsing gable wall fell atop Annie Freeman.

The tornado next struck the Burbury Brick Works along the River Cole, where it inflicted £1000 worth of damage, before moving onto the district of Greet. At Warwick Road, the tornado struck homes and several factories, including the Serck, Sutherland, and Brook Tool factories. 2 homes in Bertha Road lost their upper stories.

Continuing to the north, the tornado struck the BSA works at Small Heath, removing the roofs of several buildings and severely damaging 2 towers at the ends of the buildings. It then struck Small Heath park, reaching its maximum width of 800 meters, 400 trees were uprooted or damaged in the park, and a small motorcar was lifted and carried 50 yards, landing upside down. In the streets surrounding the park, many homes lost roofs and suffered broken windows. At Coventry Road, many businesses suffered extensive damage, losing roofs and exterior walls.

Through Small Heath, damage was extensive. Hundreds of homes lost roofs and suffered broken windows. Many trees in Somerville Road were uprooted. At Green Lane, many more businesses suffered serious damage. On the corner of Palace Road, a butchers shop wall collapsed into the road. Houses were damaged in every street from Victoria Street to Charles Road.

Entering Bordesley Green, the tornado once again caused extensive damages to homes and businesses on Bordesley Green [Road], including a roof blown from a house landing in the tramway. A large tree was uprooted on the grounds of Bordesley Green Fire Station. In Humpage Road, the roof of a house was blown into the upper floors of another, and at Cherrywood Road, Mulliners Motor Factory suffered damage to the roof.

The tornado continued through Washwood Heath, where a wooden garage was thrown 100 feet into a house, before continuing onto Gravelly Hill, where it struck factories along Tyburn Road, and felled a tree across Gravelly Hill [road]. Reaching Erdington, the tornado caused considerable damage to Erdington Cottages, uprooting trees and fences. Through Sutton Coldfield, trees were damaged. The final instance of damage was at Boldmere, where the bough of a tree was blown 40 yards.

== Aftermath ==
The tornado damaged 2221 homes and businesses. Damages were estimated at £40,000 to £50,000 (1931)

A relief fund was set up by the mayor of Birmingham, Walter Willis Saunders, which received 559 claimants. A total of £5170 (equivalent to £304,495 in 2025) was raised by the fund. The distribution of money in the fund was subject to controversy from the victims of the tornado.

British-Pathe published a newsreel shortly after the tornado, documenting the damage to homes and businesses in Small Heath.

The tornado was brought back into the public eye when another tornado of a similar intensity struck near the same neighbourhoods of Birmingham in July 2005.

== See also ==
- List of tornadoes and tornado outbreaks
- List of European tornadoes and tornado outbreaks
- Climate of the United Kingdom
- 2005 Birmingham Tornado
