= St Chrysostom's Church, Hockley =

- St Chrysostom's Church, Hockley
- 52°29′49.2″N 1°55′39.7″W
- OS grid reference: SP 04908 88831
- Location: Birmingham
- Country: England
- Denomination: Church of England

History
- Dedication: St Chrysostom

Architecture
- Architect: John Cotton
- Style: Early English
- Groundbreaking: 4 June 1887
- Completed: 10 April 1888
- Closed: 1972
- Demolished: 1974

St Chrysostom's Church, Park Road, Hockley is a former Church of England parish church in Birmingham.

== History ==
The church was established as a mission from All Saints' Church, Hockley. The foundation stone was laid on 4 June 1887 by Thomas Henry Goodwin Newton, High Sheriff of Warwickshire.

The church was built to the designs of the architect John Cotton of Temple Row, Birmingham, and opened on 10 April 1888. It comprised a nave with low aisles, double transepts, a baptistery and the foundations for a tower in the north west corner. A parish was assigned out of All Saints' Church, Hockley. Pevsner records that the church is said to have been renovated in 1891 by William Bidlake.

Part of the parish was taken to form a new parish for Bishop Latimer Memorial Church, Winson Green in 1904.

In 1972 the church was merged with All Saints' Church, Hockley and Bishop Latimer Memorial Church, Winson Green and the church was demolished in 1974.

== Organ ==
An organ by Eustace Ingram was installed in 1897. A specification of the organ can be found on the National Pipe Organ Register. The organ case was very old, dating from before 1749 and was thought to have been carved by Justinian Morse, and was formerly installed in St John the Baptist's Church, Barnet, Hertfordshire. When St Chrysostom's Church closed, the organ case was moved to St Philip's Cathedral, Birmingham where it faces into the north gallery. The organ moved from Barnet to St. Neots, then in Huntingdonshire where remained until 1855 when it was part exchanged for a new instrument built by GM Holdich. Before arriving in Birmingham the case was in the London area. Possibly at St Andrew Westminster and at a school in Forest Hill. From a letter from BB Edumunds.
