= St Patrick's Church, Bordesley =

St Patrick’s Church, Bordesley
- St Patrick’s Church, Bordesley
- 52°27′51.1″N 1°53′16.2″W
- OS grid reference: SP 07619 85186
- Location: Birmingham
- Country: England
- Denomination: Church of England

History
- Dedication: St Patrick

Architecture
- Architect: John Loughborough Pearson
- Groundbreaking: 23 November 1895
- Completed: 1896
- Demolished: 1966

St Patrick's Church, Bordesley (also known as St Patrick's Church, Highgate) was a parish church in the Church of England in Birmingham.

== History ==
The foundation stone was laid by William Lygon, 7th Earl Beauchamp on Saturday 23 November 1895. It was built to designs by the architect John Loughborough Pearson and consecrated in 1896. A small apsidal chancel by his son, Frank Loughborough Pearson (1864–1947), replaced a temporary iron east end in 1906/07.

A parish was formed in 1900 out of land in the parishes of St Alban the Martyr, Birmingham, St Paul's Church, Balsall Heath and St Thomas in the Moors, Balsall Heath.

The last service was held on 27 September 1964 and the church was demolished in 1966 and the parish merged with St Alban the Martyr, Birmingham. The rood beam and two stained-glass windows were reinstalled at St Alban's.
