= William Bidlake =

British architect (1861–1938)

William Henry Bidlake MA, FRIBA
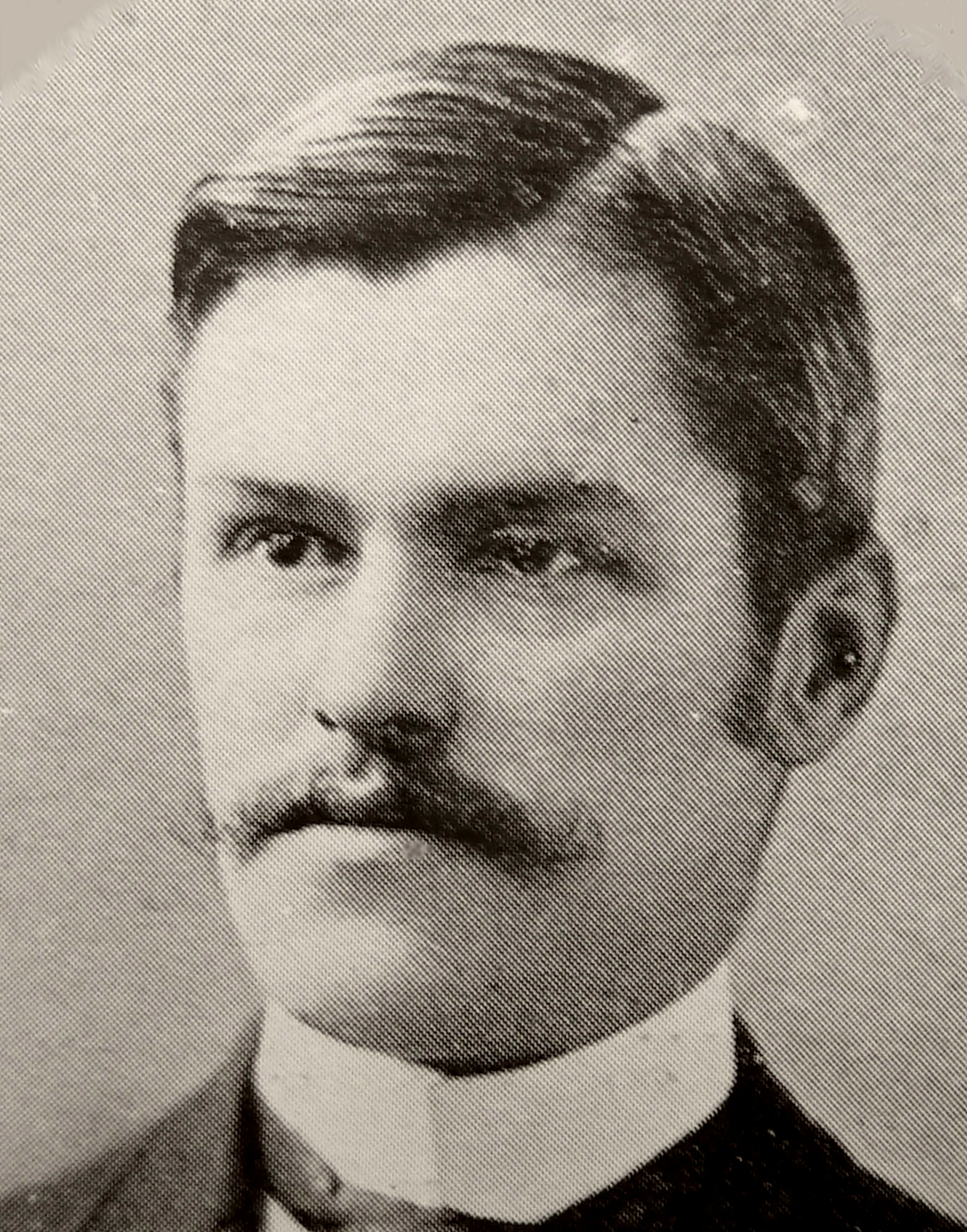
- William Henry Bidlake, in 1900
- Born: 12 May 1861; Wolverhampton, England
- Died: 6 April 1938 (aged 76); Wadhurst, Sussex, England
- Education: Tettenhall College; Christ's College, Cambridge; Royal Academy Schools
- Occupations: Architect; Director, Birmingham School of Art (1919–24)
- Style: Arts and Crafts
- Awards: RIBA Pugin Travelling Fellowship

William Henry Bidlake MA, FRIBA (12 May 1861 – 6 April 1938) was a British architect, a leading figure of the Arts and Crafts movement in Birmingham and Director of the School of Architecture at Birmingham School of Art from 1919 until 1924.

Several of Bidlake's houses in the Birmingham area were featured in Hermann Muthesius's book Das englische Haus (The English House), which was to prove influential on the early Modern Movement in Germany.

== Personal life ==
Bidlake was born in Wolverhampton, the son of local architect George Bidlake (1830–1892) from whom he received his earliest architectural training. He attended Tettenhall College and Christ's College, Cambridge, gaining his MA in 1881. In 1924, He married a woman over twenty years younger than himself and moved to Wadhurst in East Sussex, where he continued to practise until his death.

Bidlake died in 1938 and is buried in an unmarked grave in Handsworth Cemetery, Birmingham. In 1909 he had designed the cemetery's chapel, which became a Grade I listed building in 1982.

== Career ==
In 1882 Bidlake moved to London where he studied at the Royal Academy Schools and worked for Colonel Edis, F.S.A., and Gothic Revival architects Bodley and Garner. He then worked as an assistant to Robert Rowand Anderson, L.L.D, in Edinburgh. In 1885 he won the RIBA Pugin Travelling Fellowship for his draughtsmanship, which enabled him to spend 1886 travelling in Italy. On returning to England in 1887 he settled in Birmingham where he set up in independent practice at 37 Waterloo Street. From 1893, he pioneered the teaching of architecture as a lecturer at the Birmingham School of Art. Famously ambidextrous, his party trick was to sketch with both hands simultaneously.

Bidlake designed many Arts and Crafts-influenced houses in upmarket Birmingham districts such as Edgbaston, Moseley, and Four Oaks (the latter then in Warwickshire and absorbed into Birmingham in 1974), along with a series of more Gothic-influenced churches such as St Agatha's, Sparkbrook – generally considered his masterpiece.

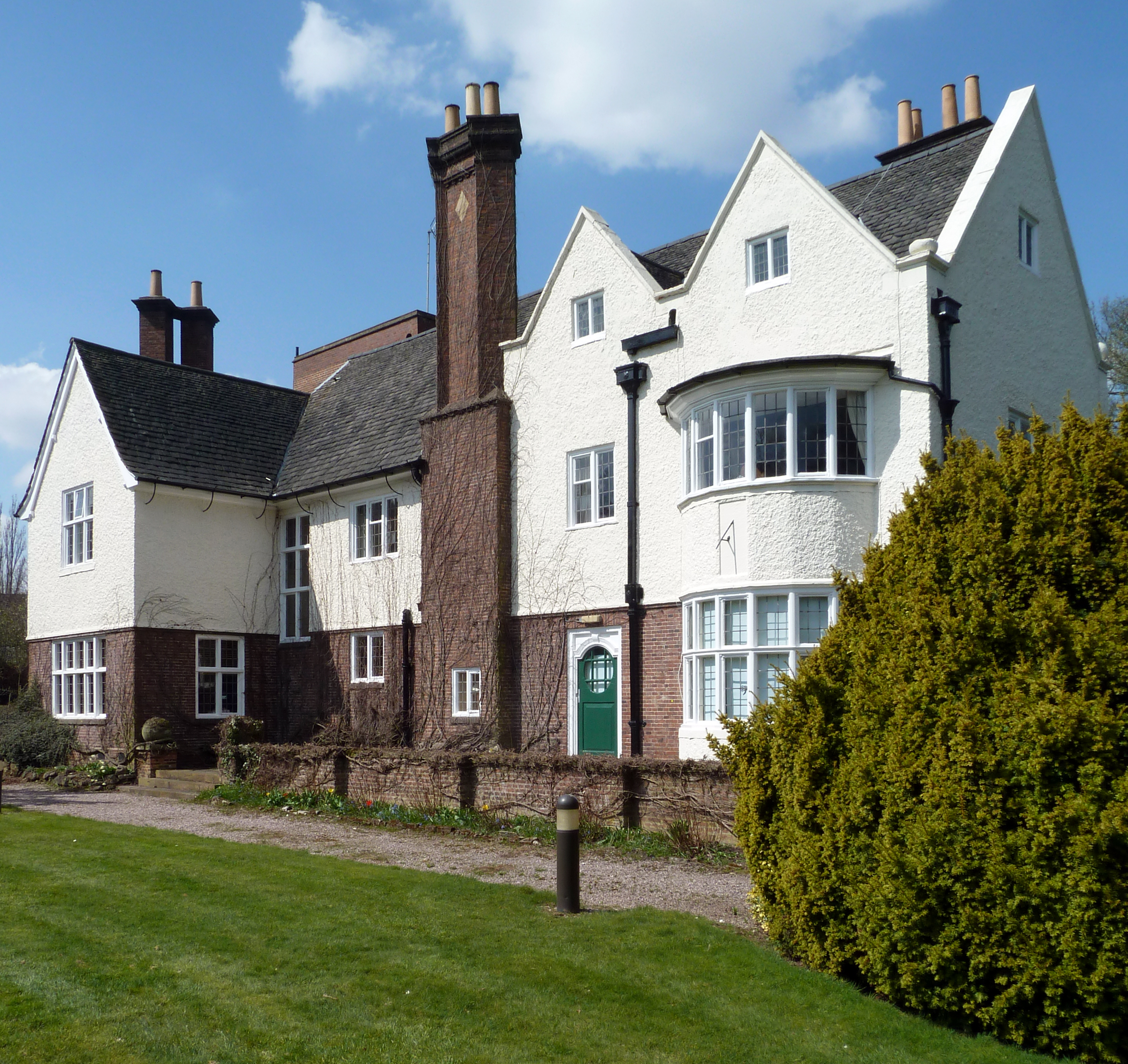
Garth House in Edgbaston, Birmingham, designed by the architect

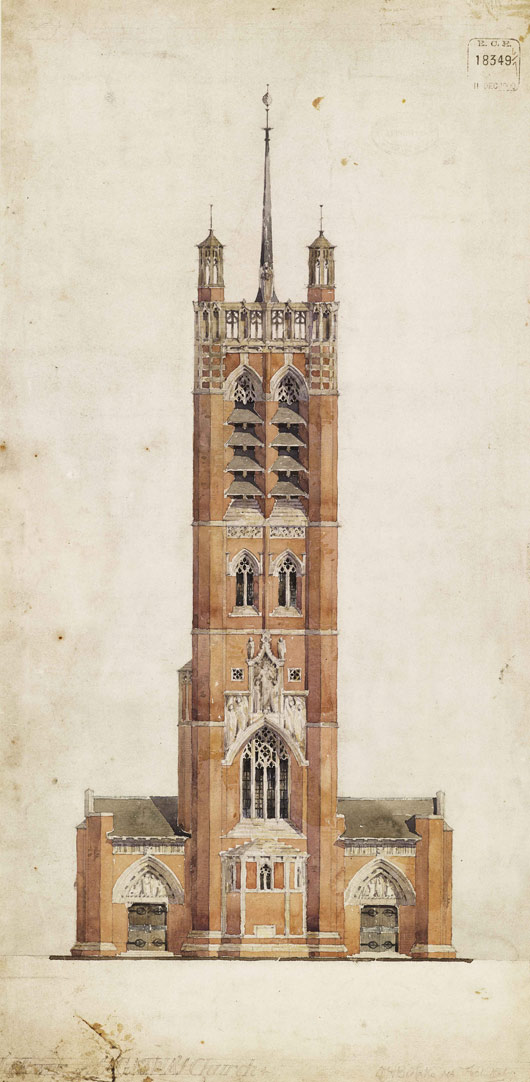
Design by Bidlake for St Agatha's Church, Sparkbrook, 1899

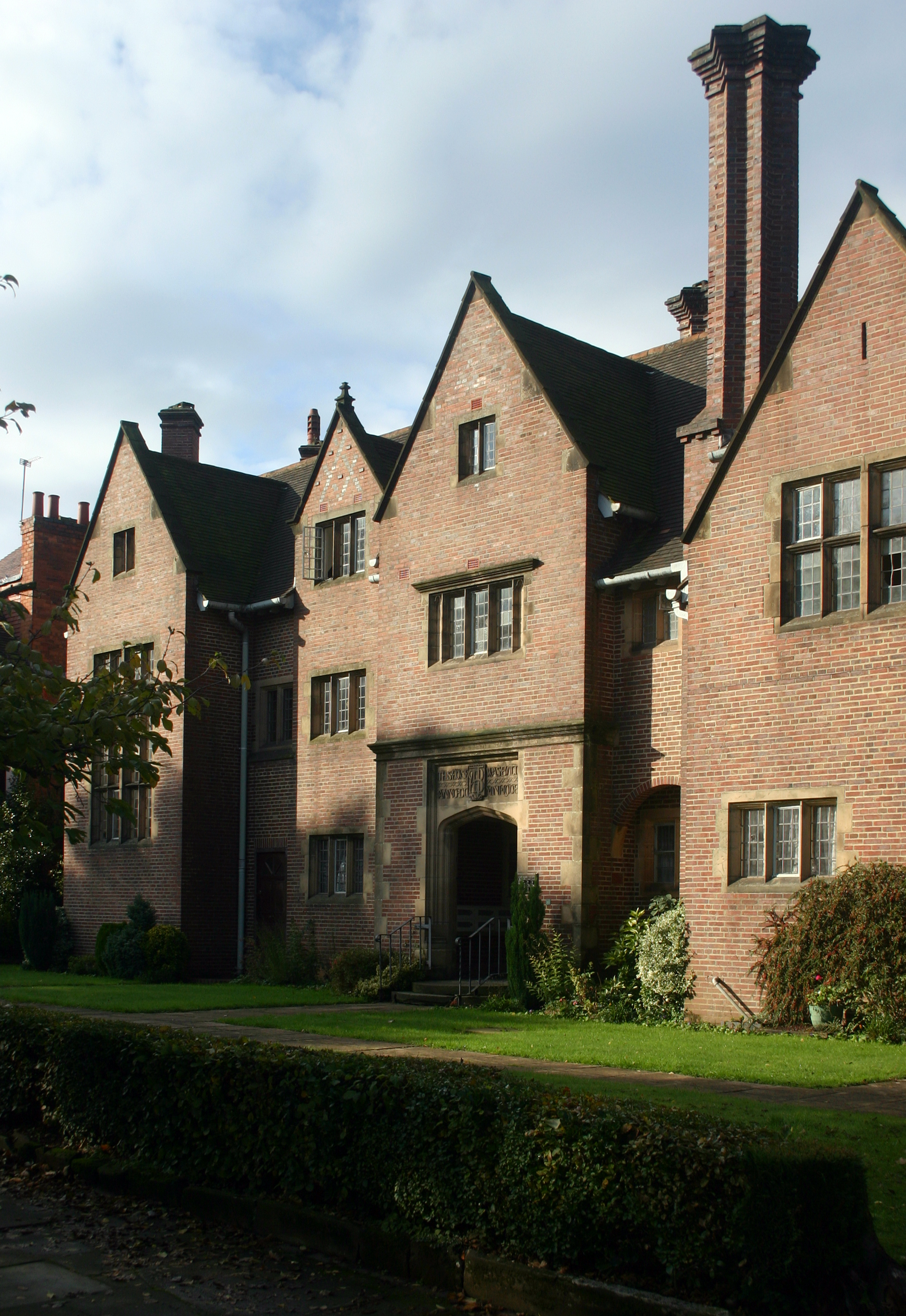
The Hurst, in Amesbury Road, Moseley, Birmingham

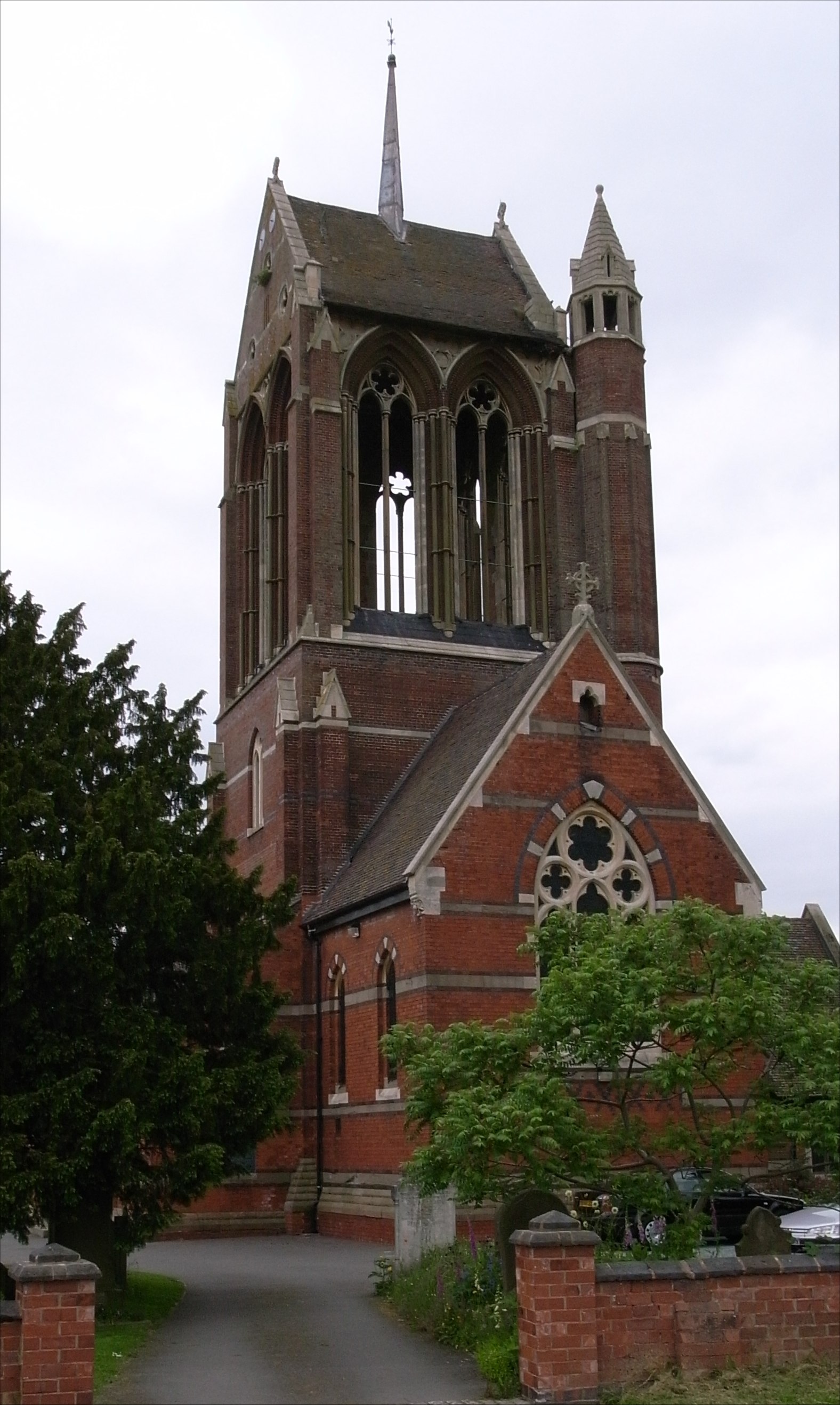
St Mary, Wythall (redundant). Roof and tower by Bidlake

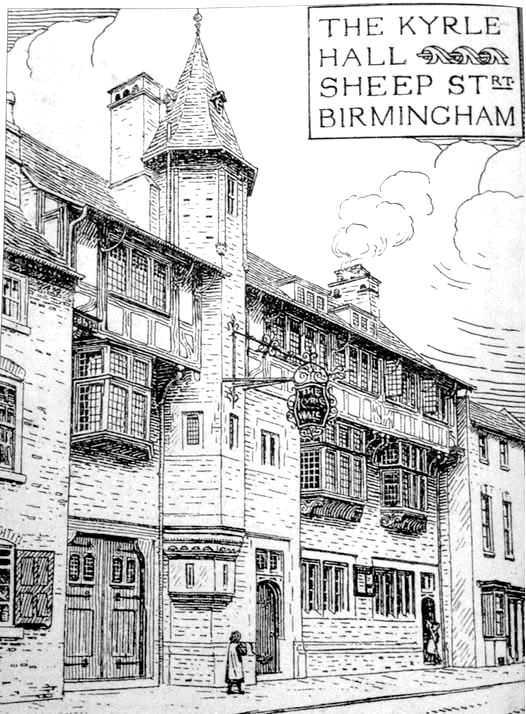
Kyrle Hall, Birmingham (demolished)

== Institutions and awards ==
Bidlake was awarded as a Silver Medallist in 1883. He became an Associate of the Royal Institute of British Architects (A.R.I.B.A.) in 1881. He was an associate, member, treasurer and then, from 1902 to 1938, Professor of Architecture of the Royal Birmingham Society of Artists. He was president of the Birmingham Architectural Association in 1899 and 1900.

== Major built works ==
- St Thomas' Church, Stourbridge. Apse (1890), north chancel screen (nd).
- The Dene, 2 Bracebridge Road, Sutton Coldfield, Birmingham (1895–1896), Grade II listed
- Woodside, 51 Bracebridge Road, Four Oaks, Sutton Coldfield (1898) – built for himself
- 17 Barker Road, Sutton Coldfield, Birmingham (1898), Grade II listed
- St Oswald's Church, Small Heath, Birmingham (1892–9), Grade II* listed.
- 18 Dora Road, Small Heath, Birmingham (1899), Grade II listed
- College of Art, Balsall Heath, Birmingham (1899), Grade II* listed
- St Patrick's Church, Salter Street, Hockley Heath, Birmingham (chancel) (1899), Grade II* listed.
- Woodgate, 37 Hartopp Road, Four Oaks, Sutton Coldfield (1900) – built for himself, Grade II listed
- Kyrle Hall, Sheep Street, Birmingham. (before 1900).
- Garth House, 47 Edgbaston Park Road, Edgbaston, Birmingham (1901), Grade II* listed
- The Hurst, 6 Amesbury Road, Moseley, Birmingham
- Emmanuel Church, Sparkbrook Birmingham (1901)
- St Agatha's Church, Stratford Road, Sparkbrook, Birmingham (1901), Grade I listed.
- 100 Sampson Road, Sparkbrook, Birmingham (St Agatha's Vicarage) (1901), Grade II* listed
- St Winnow, 22 Ladywood Road, Sutton Coldfield, Birmingham (1902), Grade II listed
- Bishop Latimer Memorial Church, Winson Green, Birmingham (1904)
- The Knoll, Glebe Road, Oadby, Leicestershire (1907), Grade II listed and Stables, Grade II listed
- St Andrew's Church, Oxhill Road, Handsworth, Birmingham (1907–9), Grade I listed
- St Matthew's Church, Shuttington, Warwickshire (restoration) (1908–1909), Grade II listed
- St Mary's Church, Wythall, Worcestershire. Roof and stair turret (nd).
- Emmanuel Church, Wylde Green, Sutton Coldfield (1909), Grade II* listed
- Gates and four sets of gate piers to Handsworth Cemetery. (1909), Grade II listed
- Lodge to Handsworth Cemetery (1909), Grade II listed
- Mortuary Chapel, Handsworth Cemetery (1910)
- St Clears, 79 Farquhar Road, Birmingham (1914), Grade II listed
- Sparkhill United Church, Stratford Road (1932–3)

== Sources ==
- Foster, Andy. Pevsner Architectural Guides: Birmingham. Yale University Press: New Haven & London, 2005 ISBN 0-300-10731-5
- Crawford, Alan (ed.). By Hammer and Hand: The Arts and Crafts Movement in Birmingham. Birmingham Museums and Art Gallery, 1984 ISBN 0-7093-0119-7
- Mitchell, Trevor. Birmingham's Victorian and Edwardian Architects Phillada Ballard. ed. Oblong, 2009 ISBN 978-0-9556576-2-7. http://www.victoriansociety.org.uk/news/new-book-celebrates-birminghams-victorian-and-edwardian-architects/.
- Literature by and about William Bidlake in the German National Library catalogue
