= All Saints' Church, Hockley =

All Saints’ Church, Hockley
- All Saints’ Church, Hockley
- 52°29′30″N 1°55′18.6″W
- Location: Birmingham
- Country: England
- Denomination: Church of England

History
- Dedication: All Saints
- Consecrated: 28 September 1833

Architecture
- Architect(s): Thomas Rickman and Henry Hutchinson
- Style: Gothic Revival
- Completed: 1833
- Demolished: 1966

Specifications
- Capacity: 1,000 people

All Saints’ Church, Hockley, originally known as All Saints’ Church, Nineveh, is a former Church of England parish church in Birmingham.

== History ==
The church was designed by Thomas Rickman and Henry Hutchinson and was a Commissioners' church built on land given by Sir Thomas Gooch. It was consecrated on 28 September 1833 by the Bishop of Worcester.

A parish was assigned out of St Martin in the Bull Ring in 1834. All Saints’ Schools were built in 1843, with a contribution from the Queen Dowager of £20 but Streetview shows that these buildings no longer exist on All Saints Street in Hockley.

A mission church was established in 1887 which became St Chrysostom’s Church, Hockley.

The church was enlarged in 1881, and demolished in 1966.

== Organ ==
The church had a pipe organ by J.C. Banfield and Son which was opened on Sunday 26 March 1843. A specification of the organ can be found on the National Pipe Organ Register. When All Saints’ closed, the organ was moved to Lyndon Methodist Church
