= Balsall Heath =

Inner-city area of Birmingham, England

Coordinates: 52°27′27.98″N 1°53′31.5″W

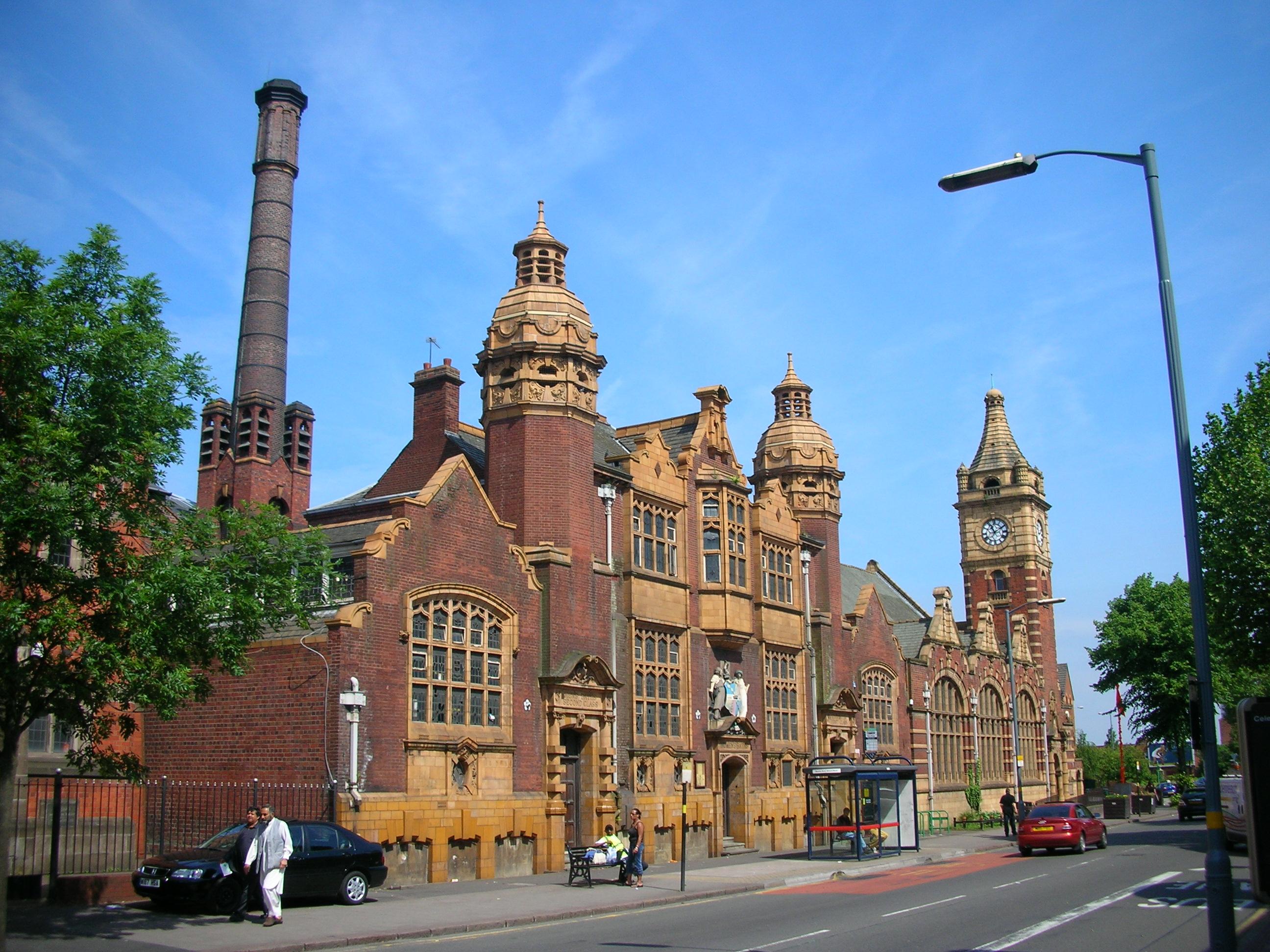
- Balsall Heath Baths and Library

- Location within the West Midlands
- Metropolitan borough: Birmingham
- Metropolitan county: West Midlands
- Region: West Midlands
- Country: England
- Sovereign state: United Kingdom
- Post town: Birmingham
- Postcode district: B12
- Dialling code: 0121
- Police: West Midlands
- Fire: West Midlands
- Ambulance: West Midlands

Balsall Heath is an inner-city area of Birmingham, West Midlands, England. It has a diverse cultural mix of people and is the location of the Balti Triangle.

== History ==
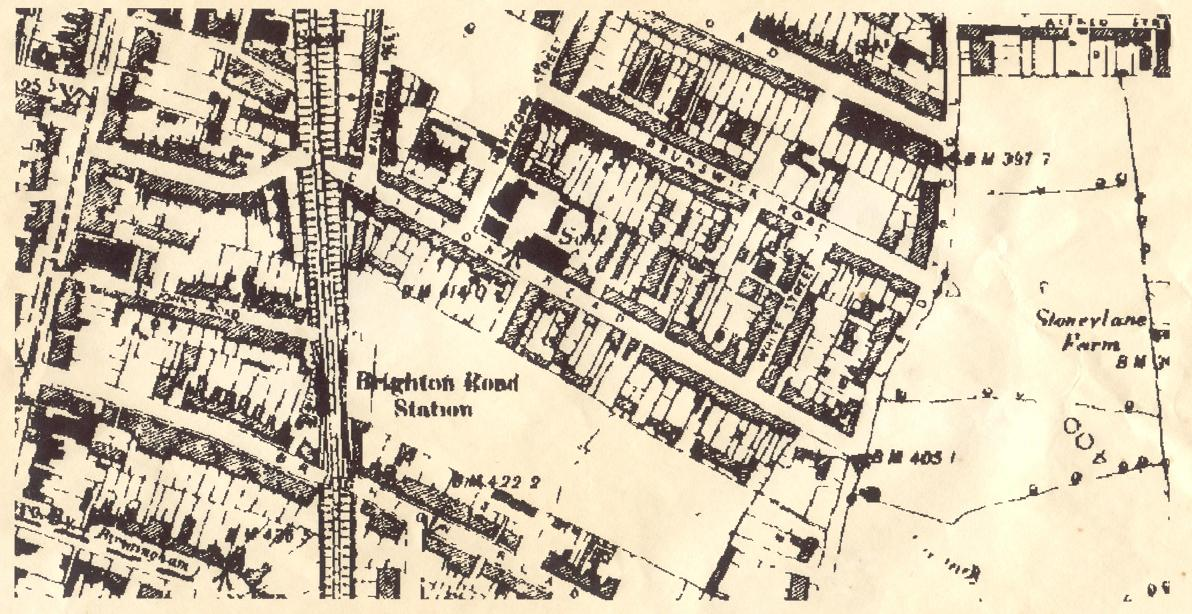
Balsall Heath, circa 1890.

The name is first found as Bordeshale in 1275, which is derived from the Old English words Bord's healh meaning 'Bord's heath' or 'Bord's nook' implying a corner or small area of land, perhaps a sheltered hollow in the landscape, protected by trees, possibly within a river-bend. The name stems from the Anglian personal name of one Bord, who held property in the area, and in this way shares its origin with that of neighbouring Bordesley, first record as Bordesleie or Bordeslea meaning 'Bord's clearing'.

Balsall Heath was largely agricultural and park land between Moseley village and the city of Birmingham until the 1850s when expansion along Moseley Road joined the two. Balsall Heath was formerly a chapelry in the parish of King's Norton, in Worcestershire, it was added to the county borough of Birmingham in Warwickshire on 1 October 1891. On 31 December 1894 Balsall Heath became a separate civil parish being formed from the part of King's Norton in the County Borough of Birmingham, on 1 April 1912 the parish was abolished and merged with Birmingham. In 1911 the parish had a population of 39,884.

During negotiations in the previous year it had been promised a public baths and a free library. In 1895, the library was opened on Moseley Road and, in 1907, Balsall Heath Baths were opened in an adjoining building.

In 1900, the city's College of Art was also opened on Moseley Road. By this time the small lake ("Lady Pool" on old maps) at the end of Ladypool Road had been filled in to create a park.

Balsall Heath initially had a reasonably affluent population, which can still be seen in the dilapidated grandeur of some of the larger houses. Brighton Road railway station led to further expansion, and the end of the 19th century saw a proliferation of high-density small terraced houses.

A Muslim community was started in June 1940 when two Yemenis purchased an artisan cottage on Mary Street. With the mosque being located in the area, more Muslim immigrants began to move into private lodgings in Balsall Heath. Today, Balsall Heath has one of the largest Muslim communities in Birmingham. It is also home to diverse communities from across the Commonwealth.

By the 1980s, many of Balsall Heath's houses were in a dilapidated condition; some still lacked bathrooms or indoor toilets. The local council considered demolishing these properties but chose to refurbish them as part of an urban renewal scheme. Most of these Victorian terraces still exist and, along with more modern social housing, characterise the area today. The area's traditional 'brick' pavements were replaced at this time by the more modern and conventional paving slabs.

Balsall Heath's low rents also attracted a bohemian student population. Its proximity to the University of Birmingham, the city centre and the "trendy" area of Moseley were all contributing factors. There was little conflict between the students and locals despite their vastly differing lifestyles. However, a knife-incident in 1991 led to an article in Redbrick warning students not to live in the area.

In July 2005, Balsall Heath was hit by a tornado, which devastated many buildings around Church Road and Ladypool Road. Birmingham City Council offered loans to those who would otherwise be unable to repair their properties, and the area has now made a full recovery.

=== Red light era ===
Street prostitution first appeared in Balsall Heath during the 1950s. Property values fell, attracting Birmingham's poorer migrants. By the 1970s, the area was notorious for street robberies and drug dealing. Cheddar Road was the centre of a red-light district worked by 450 women. About half of the 50 houses on this road had prostitutes advertising themselves in the windows, similar to Amsterdam. It was labelled Britain's busiest cul-de-sac. This period of the area's history is depicted in the 1980 film Prostitute.

In 1986, an organisation called ANAWIM was formed by the Sisters of Charity to provide outreach support to the prostitutes.

In September 1992, a report was published encouraging the formation of a zone of tolerance towards prostitution in Balsall Heath. This was opposed by residents and a local police inspector. In the following year Samo Paull, a woman working as a prostitute, was abducted from Balsall Heath and murdered.

In 1994, residents began to organise street patrols forcing the prostitutes and street criminals out of the area. These patrols had the qualified support of the police but were regarded as vigilantes by some. There was an immediate two-thirds reduction in street and window prostitution. By November 1995, they had been almost eliminated.

The area has enjoyed a slow revival. House prices are now similar to those in other inner-city areas, while the crime rate is among the lowest.

== Politics and governance ==
Balsall Heath is divided by two wards for elections to Birmingham City Council; Balsall Heath West and Sparkbrook and Balsall Heath East. There are a total of three councillors between the two wards, two Independent councillors: Jamil Khan and Raihaan Abbas, and one Green Party councillor: Duncan Ali.

Balsall Heath West is part of the Birmingham Ladywood constituency for general elections to the House of Commons of the United Kingdom, whereas Sparkbrook and Balsall Heath East is Part of the Birmingham Hall Green Constituency.

== Notable buildings ==
- Moseley Road Baths
- Moseley School of Art
- St Barnabas' Church
- St Paul's Church

== Notable residents ==
- Donnaleigh Bailey, Michelle Corrigan in the Birmingham-based soap Doctors
- Alderman John Bowen, JP
- Percy Bullock, Worcestershire cricketer
- Howard R. Davies, racing motorcyclist
- Alan Deakin, former Aston Villa captain
- Oscar Deutsch, founder of the Odeon cinema chain
- David Edgar, playwright
- John Kenneally VC
- Don Maclean, comedian
- Conroy Maddox, surrealist artist
- William Mosedale, George Cross recipient
- Sir Robert Howson Pickard FRS stereochemist and vice-chancellor of the University of London 1937–1939
- Anthony E. Pratt, inventor of the board game Cluedo
- UB40, a reggae band
