= 2005 Birmingham tornado =

Tornado in the United Kingdom

- The tornado seen over Moseley, taken from Stratford Road

Meteorological history
- Date: 28 July 2005
- Formed: 14:37 BST (UTC+01:00)
- Dissipated: 15:00 BST (UTC+01:00)
- Duration: 23 minutes

IF3 tornado
- on the International Fujita scale

T6 tornado
- on the TORRO scale
- Highest winds: 144–216 mph (232–348 km/h)

Overall effects
- Fatalities: 0
- Injuries: 39
- Damage: £40 million (2005)
- Areas affected: Birmingham, England
- Part of the tornadoes of 2005

The 2005 Birmingham tornado was an IF3 tornado which occurred on the afternoon of 28 July 2005, causing significant damage to the southern and eastern suburbs of Birmingham, and becoming the costliest tornado ever recorded in Great Britain. Several organisations have rated the tornado with varying degrees of intensity; most recently, the ESSL rated the tornado IF3 on the International Fujita scale.

== Background ==
While England has more reported tornadoes relative to its land area than any other country, the vast majority are weak. According to the Met Office, around 30 tornadoes hit the UK every year, though most are small and dissipate without causing significant damage.

Several tornadoes have struck the city of Birmingham. An F3 tornado struck the city in 1931, killing one woman and severely damaging hundreds of houses. On 23 November 1981, during a record-breaking nationwide tornado outbreak, three tornadoes touched down within the Birmingham city limits – in Erdington, Kings Heath, and Selly Oak – with three other tornadoes touching down within the boundaries of the wider West Midlands county. Notable tornadoes also struck the city in 1946, 1968, and 1999.

== Meteorological synopsis ==
On the morning of 28 July, a shallow depression was located southwest of Cornwall, with a slow-moving warm front extending across the Midlands and a cold front advancing from the southwest. Early cloud cover gave way to breaks in the afternoon, allowing surface heating to destabilize the atmosphere. This heating, combined with an elevated mixed layer of dry air advected from Spain, created conditions favorable for intense convection.

The supercell responsible for the tornado developed along a triple point, where the synoptic cold front intersected an insolation-enhanced warm front, a boundary strengthened by solar heating. This intersection enhanced low-level convergence and vorticity, providing the necessary lift for thunderstorm development. The environment featured moderate instability (1000–1600 J/kg of CAPE) and extreme wind shear, particularly in the lowest 1–3 km of the atmosphere, where directional shear promoted rotating updrafts.

The supercell thunderstorm that produced the Birmingham tornado developed at around 13:45 BST to the south of Birmingham, and moved north-northeastwards toward the city. Several other supercell thunderstorms developed across the Midlands later that afternoon, producing brief, weak tornadoes, including one which damaged a church roof in Moulton, Lincolnshire.

Confirmed tornadoes by Fujita rating
FU	F0	F1	F2	F3	F4	F5	Total
1	2	0	0	1	0	0	4

== Tornado summary ==
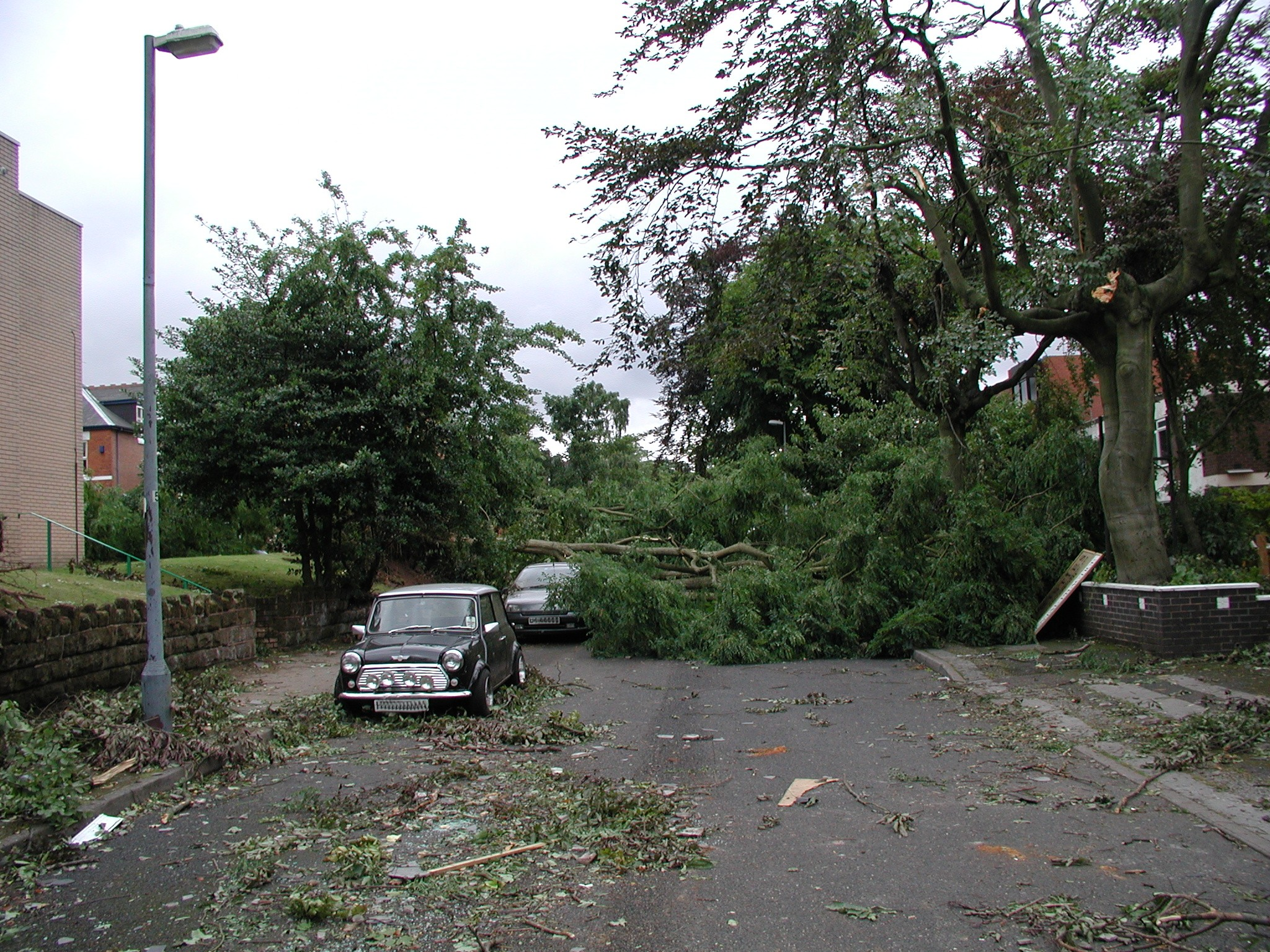
Damage caused by the tornado in Moseley

At 2:29 PM BST, a funnel cloud was photographed from the Hopwood Park Service area on the M42 motorway, 8.5 miles south of Birmingham. TORRO concluded that this was a separate, T2 tornado. By around 2:37 PM, the main tornado began in Howard Road, Kings Heath. Initially crossing Alcester Rd South, the tornado inflicted roof damage to several buildings, including a roof torn off and thrown across the road. A woman was taken to hospital after being struck by flying debris.

Continuing northeastward into Wake Green and Moseley, the tornado began causing more significant damage to trees and homes. Several streets including Blenheim Road were completely blocked by fallen trees.

Reaching Balsall Heath, the tornado attained peak IF3 intensity: several shops had their windows blown out and lost portions of their roofs. Several rows of terraced homes along Birchwood Road and Alder Road in Balsall Heath had their roofs torn off, and several sustained exterior wall damage to the upper floors. Cars were rolled several metres down driveways, and trees were flattened in Balsall Heath park.

Continuing northwards across Stratford Road, Ladypool Primary School was extensively damaged and lost its Martin & Chamberlain tower. The adjacent St Agatha's Church also suffered some damage. Christ Church, on the corner of Dolobran Road and Grantham Road in Sparkbrook, was also damaged and has now been demolished.

Farm Park, Sparkhill suffered severe damage, shortly before the tornado approached Coventry Road where it significantly damaged a Wedding Hall and several homes; at this point, the tornado was weakening as it continued northwards past St Andrew's Stadium. A brick wall was blown down at Saltley Viaduct, and minor tree damage was noted along Heartlands Parkway at the intersection with Cuckoo Road. The tornado crossed the M6 Motorway just east of the Gravelly Hill interchange. TV Aerial damage was found in The Oval, Erdington, as well as minor roof damage. The final instance of damage came from Erdington Abbey, where trees suffered minor branch damage.

== Aftermath and rating ==
Immediately following the tornado, more than 50 ambulance, and 25 fire crews were deployed to the scene, along with sniffer dogs, and West Midlands Fire Service declared a major incident. Over a dozen people were taken to hospital for treatment, 39 were injured, several severely. Then-Birmingham council leader, Paul Tillesley, remarked that it was a "miracle" that no fatalities occurred.

Hundreds of residents were evacuated from significantly damaged areas, particularly Balsall Heath, while emergency services searched over 1000 properties. Overall, more than 500 buildings were damaged, including 115 businesses, Ladypool Primary School, churches, and hundreds of houses- several were subsequently marked for demolition.

Birmingham City Council provided emergency accommodation for over 160 people following the tornado, and granted a £1 million recovery fund. The tornado is the costliest on record in the UK, having caused £40 million of damage, equivalent to £71 million in 2025.

Three months later, on 12 October 2005, an IF2 tornado caused damage to roofs in Dovey Road, Moseley, less than a mile from the path of the 28 July tornado.

=== Rating ===
In August 2006, Timothy P. Marshall and Stuart Robinson with the Haag Engineering Co, rated the tornado EF2 on a draft version of the-then unpublished Enhanced Fujita scale, marking one of the first tornadoes to receive an EF-scale rating. In July 2015, the tornado was rated T5–6 on the TORRO scale by the Tornado and Storm Research Organisation based on the United Kingdom. The European Severe Storms Laboratory rated the tornado F2, on the Fujita scale and T4 on the TORRO scale. However, in December 2024, this rating was amended to IF3 on the new International Fujita scale.

== See also ==
- List of tornadoes and tornado outbreaks
- List of European tornadoes and tornado outbreaks
- Climate of the United Kingdom
- 1981 United Kingdom tornado outbreak
