= Christ Church, Sparkbrook =

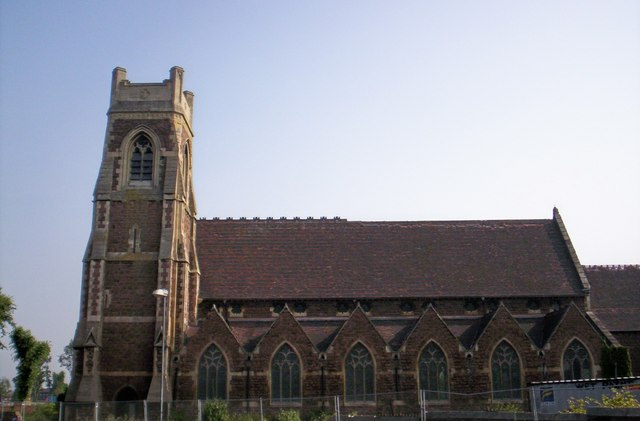
- Christ Church, Sparkbrook
- Christ Church, Sparkbrook
- 52°27′47″N 1°52′16″W
- OS grid reference: SP 08763 85072
- Location: Sparkbrook
- Country: England
- Denomination: Church of England

Architecture
- Architect(s): Medland, Maberley and Medland
- Groundbreaking: 1867
- Closed: 2005
- Demolished: 2007

Administration
- Diocese: Anglican Diocese of Birmingham
- Archdeaconry: Birmingham
- Parish: Sparkbrook

Christ Church, Sparkbrook was a church in the Anglican Diocese of Birmingham.

== History ==
The original Christ Church building was opened in 1867. The spire was removed in 1918 and the tower taken down after damage by a blast in the Second World War. It was badly damaged in the 2005 Birmingham tornado and was subsequently demolished, despite a campaign by the Victorian Society to save it. A useful replacement building was dedicated in 2013, and a small Christian community continues to meet there, serving the people of Sparkbrook.
