= Alice Baldwin =

Alice Baldwin may refer to:

- Alice Baldwin (abbess) (died 1546), last Abbess of Burnham Abbey
- Alice Gertrude Baldwin (1859–1943) African-American suffragist
- Alice Mary Baldwin (1879–1960), American historian, educator, and dean of the Woman's College at Duke University, 1923–1947
