= St John's Church, Birmingham =

St John's Church, Birmingham may refer to:

- St John's Church, Deritend
- St John's Church, Ladywood
- St John the Evangelist's Church, Perry Barr
- St John's Church, Sparkhill

in Birmingham, England.
