= William Chafe =

American historian (born 1942)

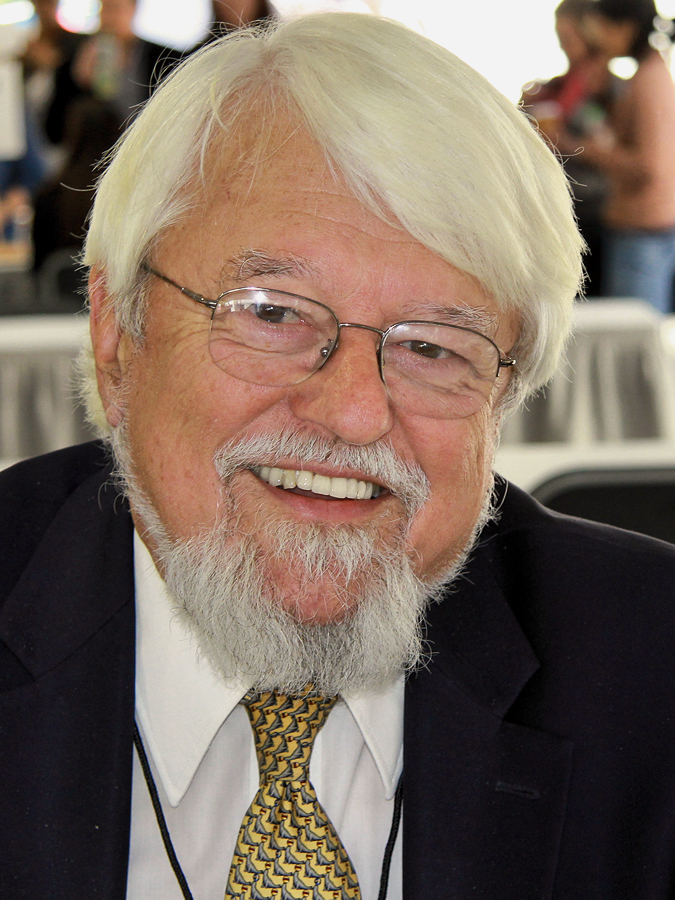
- Chafe at the 2012 Texas Book Festival
- Born: William H. Chafe; January 28, 1942 (age 84)
- Education: Columbia University (PhD)
- Occupation: Historian

William H. Chafe (/ˈtʃeɪf/; born January 28, 1942) is an American historian, and currently Alice Mary Baldwin Professor Emeritus of History at Duke University in Durham, North Carolina.

== Career ==
Professor Chafe received his PhD from Columbia University in 1971, and is the author of numerous notable historical texts on United States history. Chafe's research interests focus on gender and racial equality. His publications include: Bill and Hillary: The Politics of the Personal (2012); The Rise and Fall of the American Century: The United States from 1890 to 2008 (2008); The Unfinished Journey: American Since World War II (Oxford University Press, 2006); Private Lives/Public Consequences: Personality and Politics in Modern America (Harvard University Press, 2005); Never Stop Running (Princeton University Press, 1998); The Paradox of Change: American Women in the 20th Century (Oxford University Press, 1991); Civilities and Civil Rights: Greensboro, North Carolina, and the Black Struggle for Freedom (Oxford University Press, 1981).

Civilities and Civil Rights: Greensboro, North Carolina, and the Black Struggle for Freedom won The First Annual Robert F. Kennedy Center for Justice and Human Rights Book award given in 1981 to a novelist who "most faithfully and forcefully reflects Robert Kennedy's purposes - his concern for the poor and the powerless, his struggle for honest and even-handed justice, his conviction that a decent society must assure all young people a fair chance, and his faith that a free democracy can act to remedy disparities of power and opportunity."
