= Seoul Anglican Cathedral English Mission =

English-language Anglican congregation in Korea

Seoul Anglican Cathedral English Mission is an English-language Anglican congregation in Korea. Anglican worship in English has been held on the site of the present Seoul Anglican Cathedral since its predecessor the Church of the Advent held its first Holy Communion service on 21 December 1890. Even after the first missionaries had learned enough Korean and translated the liturgy according to the Book of Common Prayer into Korean, worship services in English continued for members of the foreign community in Seoul who desired Anglican or Episcopal Church services in that language. It is probable that the only time services in English have been discontinued at Seoul Cathedral were during the Second World War, when Korea was under Japanese occupation, and during those periods of the Korean War when Seoul was captured by North Korean forces.

The present cathedral dedicated to St. Mary and St. Nicholas was constructed in the mid-1920s under the direction of the Rt. Reverend Mark Trollope, third Bishop of the Anglican Church of Korea and was opened for public worship on 2 May 1926. The Cathedral was built in a Romanesque style with hints of Korean architecture and was designed by a British architect Arthur Stansfield Dixon. Due to financial constraints at the time the Cathedral could not be finished and the "unfinished" but beautiful and evocative building became a landmark feature in Seoul located beside Deoksu Palace and across from Seoul City Hall. In 1993 the discovery of the architect's original plans for the full cathedral led to a drive by the now resurgent Anglican Church of Korea to complete the cathedral. This task was completed on 2 May 1996 with the re-dedication of the extended building according to the original plan.

The English Mission has traditionally worshiped in the smaller Crypt Chapel dedicated to St. John the Baptist which is also called the Advent Chapel to commemorate the Church of the Advent which the cathedral replaced. Mark Trollope is buried in the Crypt Chapel and his remains lie under a copperplate engraving of him by Francis Cooper which was completed in 1932. At present up to one hundred worshippers, foreigners and Koreans, gather in the Crypt Chapel for Holy Communion in English every Sunday at 9.30 am. At other times the Chapel is used for Korean-language worship. As from the very beginnings of the English Mission the congregation is drawn from many different countries and is united by a desire to worship in the Anglican-Episcopal usage in the English language. The growth in numbers and nationalities attending services at the English Mission in the period from the mid-1990s onwards reflects the growth of Seoul as an East Asian mega city with over 180,000 foreign dwellers recorded in 2007.

In a small space located at the top right corner of the crypt, the remains of the first consecrated Korean Anglican archbishop, Rev. Lee, Cheon-Hwan lie in peace.

== See also ==
- Seoul Anglican Cathedral
- Anglican Church of Korea

References

- Seoul Anglican Cathedral English Mission Homepage
- Seoul Anglican Cathedral English Language Mission Blog
