= St Basil's Church, Deritend =

St Basil’s Church, Deritend
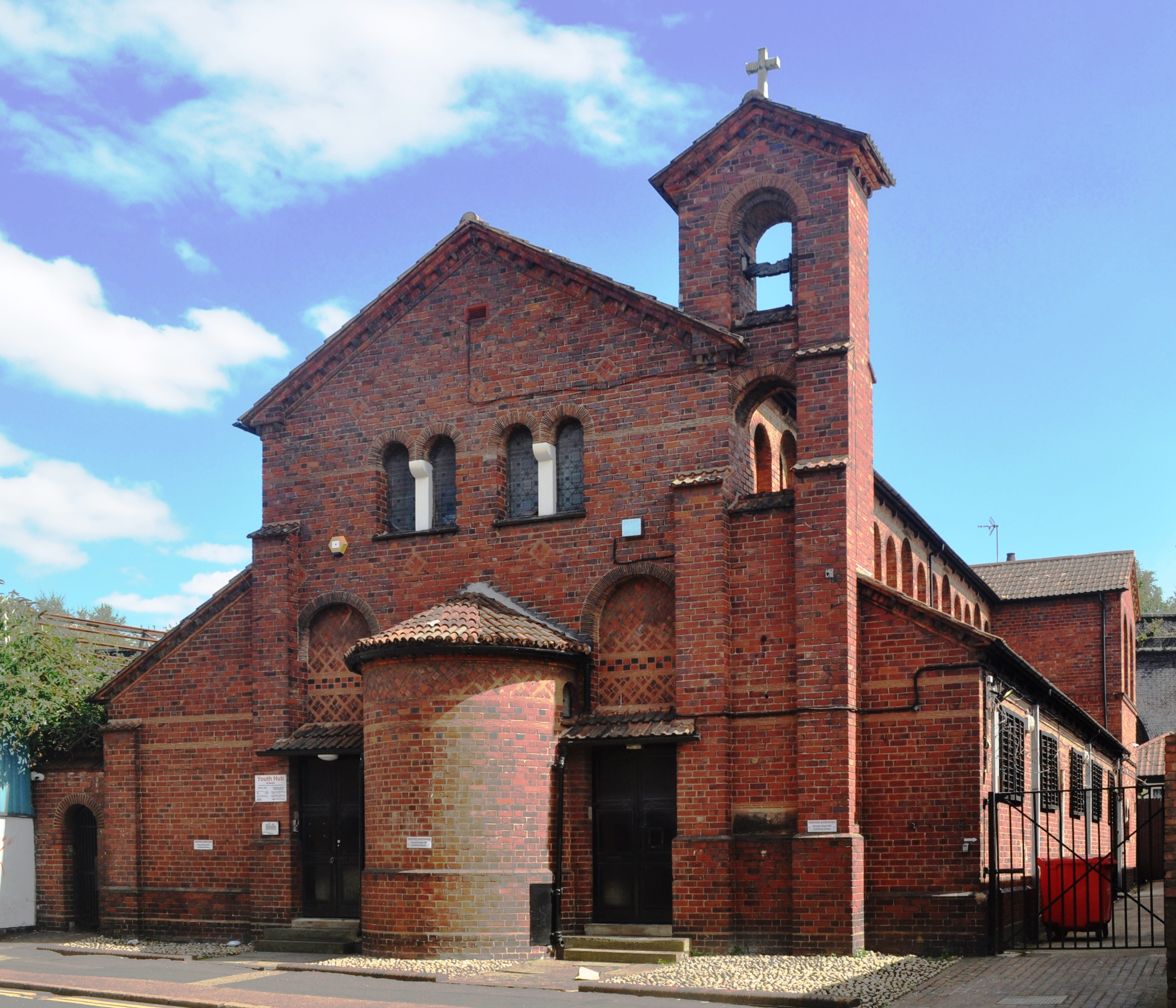
- The former church in August 2024
- St Basil’s Church, Deritend
- 52°28′37″N 1°52′53.5″W
- OS grid reference: SP 08160 86557
- Location: Birmingham
- Country: England
- Denomination: Church of England

Architecture
- Architect: Arthur Stansfield Dixon
- Groundbreaking: 1910
- Completed: 1911

St Basil's Church, Deritend (later known as St John and St Basil's Church, Deritend) is a Grade II listed former parish church in the Church of England in Birmingham.

== History ==
The parish was formed in 1896 from parts of Holy Trinity Church, Bordesley and St Andrew's Church, Bordesley. The church building was constructed between 1910 and 1911 and was designed by Arthur Stansfield Dixon.

In 1939 the church was united with St John's Church, Deritend and St Basil's Church was used as the church of the united benefice. In 1978, St Basil's Church was closed, and the parish united with St Martin in the Bull Ring.

The church is now used as the St Basil Centre, providing help to young people.

== Organ ==
The church was equipped with a pipe organ by Harrison and Harrison dating from 1911. A specification of the organ can be found on the National Pipe Organ Register. On closure the organ was transferred to Worcester Cathedral.
