= St John's Church, Deritend =

St John’s Church, Deritend
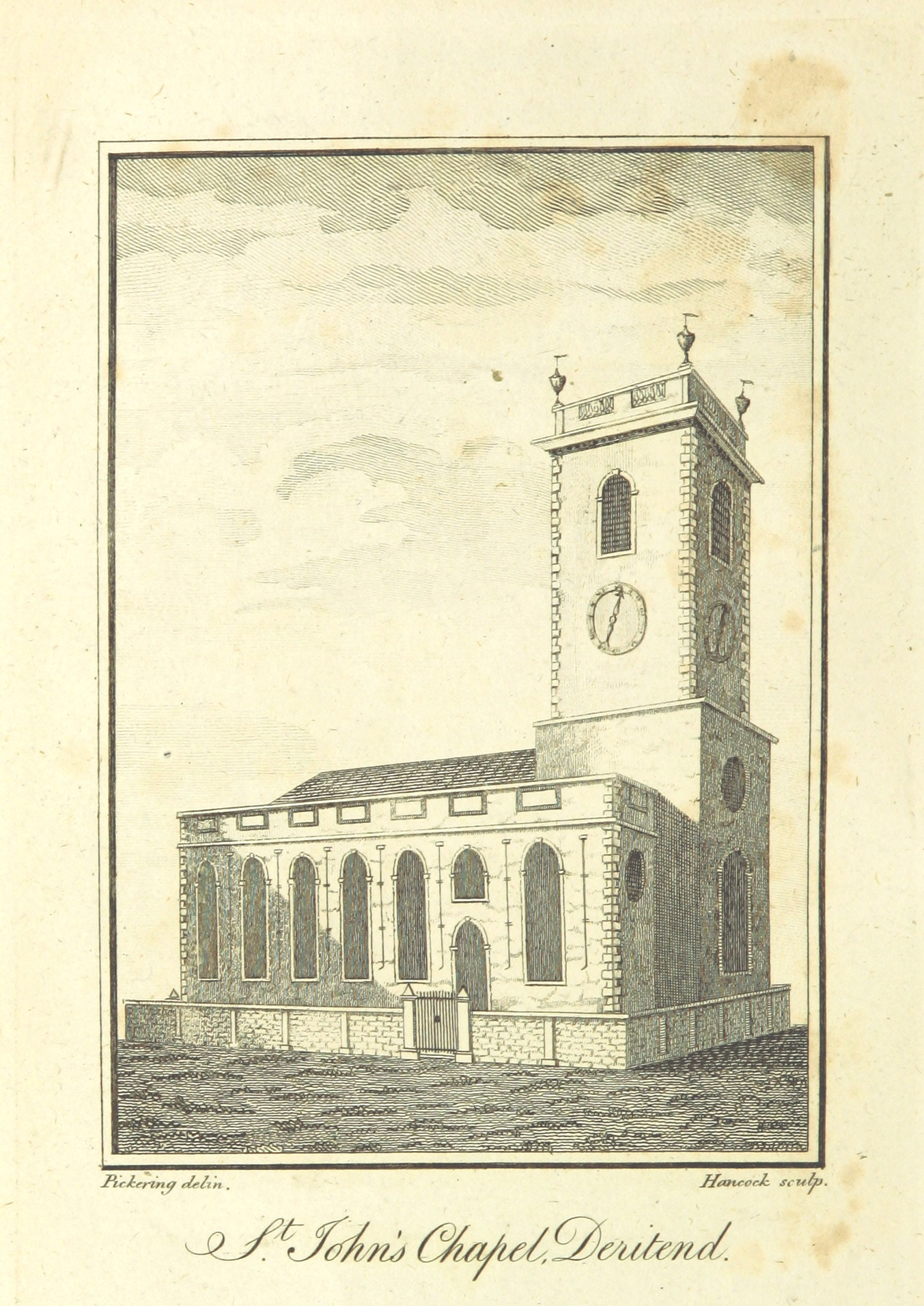
- St John’s Church, Deritend (as rebuilt in 1735)
- St John’s Church, Deritend
- 52°28′28.6″N 1°53′7.2″W
- OS grid reference: SP 07787 86345
- Location: Birmingham
- Country: England
- Denomination: Church of England

History
- Dedication: St John the Baptist
- Dedicated: 1380

Architecture
- Demolished: 1947

St John's Church, Deritend was a parish church in the Church of England in Birmingham, which stood from 1735 until it was demolished in 1947.

== History ==
A church was established in 1380 when the villagers in Deritend were given the right to build their own chapel rather than travel three miles to Aston Parish Church.

The church was noted as being the place of worship of John Rogers, the first English Protestant martyr under Mary I.

The church was rebuilt in 1735, and the tower added in 1762. In 1939 the church was united with St Basil's Church, Deritend and St Basil's was used as the church of the united benefice. St John's was demolished in 1947. The calvary which had been erected as a memorial for the First World War was moved to St Gabriel's Church, Weoley Castle.

=== Incumbents ===
- John Darwall 1791-1828 (also Vicar of Walsall from 1796)
- Edward Palmer 1828-1842
- W. Bramwell Smith 1842-1870
- W.C. Badger 1870 - 1889
- John Oliver West 1889-1891 (afterwards vicar of St Matthew's Church, Duddeston and Nechells)
- T. Tirebuck 1891-1896 (formerly vicar of St Matthew's Church, Duddeston and Nechells)
- T.J. Haworth 1896 - 1904 (formerly vicar of St Anne's Church, Duddeston)
- Canon E.P. Gonner 1904-1918
- J.A. Morgan 1918-1929 (formerly vicar of St Paul's Church, Bordesley Green)
- James Nixon from 1929

== Bells ==
Eight bells were cast in 1776 by Robert Wells of Aldbourne, Wiltshire. They were removed and recast into a new ring which were installed in Bishop Latimer Memorial Church, Winson Green and then were moved to St John's Church, Perry Barr in 1972.

== Organ ==
In 1906 the church acquired an organ from St Martin in the Bull Ring which dated from 1822. It was installed by Walter James Bird.
