= St Matthew's Church, Duddeston and Nechells =

St Matthew’s Church, Duddeston and Nechells
- St Matthew’s Church, Duddeston and Nechells
- 52°29′26.2″N 1°52′38.9″W
- OS grid reference: SP 08428 88086
- Location: Duddeston
- Country: England
- Denomination: Church of England
- Website: www.astonnechellscofe.org.uk/contact#stm

History
- Dedication: St Matthew

Architecture
- Heritage designation: Grade II listed
- Architect: William Thomas
- Groundbreaking: 1839
- Completed: 1840

Specifications
- Capacity: 1,300 people in 1866. Now 0.

Administration
- Diocese: Anglican Diocese of Birmingham
- Parish: Aston and Nechells

St Matthew's Church, Duddeston and Nechells is a Grade II listed parish church in the Church of England in Birmingham.

== History ==
The church was designed by the architect William Thomas of Leamington Spa. The foundation stone was laid in October 1839. It was consecrated by the Bishop of Worcester in October 1840. It was built as a daughter church to St Peter and Paul's Church, Aston and was the first of the five churches built by the Birmingham Church Building Society.

In 1866, J. A. Chatwin added galleries to increase the seating capacity. The church was restored in 1883.

In 1868 part of the parish was taken to form that of St Lawrence's Church, Duddeston. When St Lawrence closed in 1951, the parish was reunited.

In 1898 part of the parish was taken to form that of St Anne's Church, Duddeston. When St Anne closed in 1951, the parish was reunited.

In 1994 a rebuilding scheme converted the church in a multi-purpose building, with a worship area for 250 people at the east end, and office and community accommodation in the remaining portion.

In 2020, the remaining worship area at the east end was purchased by Kensington Community Care (Gloucester) Ltd. As of 2025, there is no worship area.

== Incumbents ==
- George Stringer Bull 1840 - 1847 (afterwards Rector at St Thomas' Church, Birmingham)
- S.R. Walter from 1847
- James Hamer Scowcroft 1858-1879 (afterwards vicar of Bishops Itchington)
- Joseph Byrchmore 1880-1887 (afterwards vicar of Tickenham)
- T. Tirebuck 1887-1891 (afterwards vicar of St John's Church, Deritend)
- John Oliver West 1891-1898 (formerly vicar at St John's Church, Deritend, afterwards vicar of Rowington)
- Arthur Pritchard 1898-1904
- William Lambert Baker 1906-1915
- James Joseph Caleb 1915-1918
- Alfred Brown 1918-1928
- Charles Gabriel Mollan 1928-1936 (afterwards vicar of Middleton, Tamworth)
- J.G. Hathaway 1936-1940 (afterwards vicar of Settle)
- Albert Harry Selway 1944-1951 (afterwards vicar of Aston)
- Edward Maldwyn Thomas 1951 - ca. 1975
- John Weller ca. 1984
- James Langstaff ca. 1990 ca. 1996
