= Society of the Precious Blood =

Anglican order of Augustinian nuns

The Society of the Precious Blood is an Anglican religious order of contemplative sisters with convents in England, Lesotho and South Africa. The sisters follow the Rule of St Augustine.

== History ==
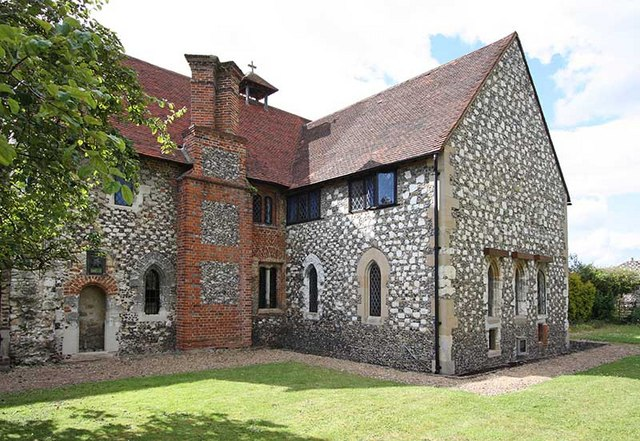
Burnham Abbey

The Order dates its history from 1905 when Mother Millicent Mary SPB (formerly Millicent Taylor) took vows in the parish of St Jude, Birmingham. The community which formed around her became established, living in King's Heath, Birmingham and in 1916 it moved to Burnham Abbey near Maidenhead, living an enclosed community life, within the Diocese of Oxford. Built in 1266, Burnham Abbey had been a house of Augustinian Canonesses until the Reformation.

In 1957 a group of five sisters established a priory in the Kingdom of Lesotho. This in 1966 become an autonomous province of the Order and spread into South Africa in 1980.

By 2024, the community in England consisted of ten sisters. Seven relocated to long-term care facilities and the remaining three reside at the convent of the Community of the Sisters of the Church in Gerrards Cross, while the abbey has been put up for sale.

== The foundress ==
Millicent Taylor was born in India in 1869; her father, Reynell Taylor was an army officer. At the age of 22, she declared her wish for the religious life but became a parish worker in poor parishes in east London, Reading and Birmingham. In 1905, she made her first profession on St Luke's Day, 1905, in St Jude's Church, Birmingham. She resigned as Superior in 1942 because of ill health and died in 1956.

== Structure ==
=== SPB United Kingdom ===
An elected Reverend Mother presides over the sisters.

- Burnham Abbey, Maidenhead, is the only convent

=== SPB Africa ===
An elected Prioress presides over the African sisters, whose convents are:

- Priory of Our Lady Mother of Mercy, Maseru, Lesotho
- St Monica's House of Prayer, Kimberley, South Africa

== See also ==
- Augustinian nuns in the Anglican Communion
