= St Mark's Church, Ladywood =

St Mark’s Church, Ladywood
- St Mark’s Church, Ladywood
- 52°28′59.6″N 1°55′11.0″W
- Location: Birmingham
- Country: England
- Denomination: Church of England

History
- Dedication: St Mark
- Consecrated: 29 July 1841

Architecture
- Architect: George Gilbert Scott
- Style: Early English Gothic
- Completed: 1841
- Construction cost: £4,000
- Demolished: 1947

Specifications
- Capacity: 1,000 people

St Mark's Church, Ladywood, originally known as St Mark's Church, Summerhill is a former Church of England parish church in Birmingham.

== History ==
The church was built on King Edward's Road, Ladywood by the Birmingham Church Building Society to designs by the architect George Gilbert Scott. The foundation stone was laid on 31 March 1840 by James Taylor. It was consecrated by the Bishop of Worcester on 29 July 1841.

A parish was assigned out of St Martin in the Bull Ring in 1843.

The church was closed in 1947 and demolished.

== Organ ==
The church had a pipe organ by Banfield. A specification of the organ can be found on the National Pipe Organ Register.
