= Christ Church, Ward End =

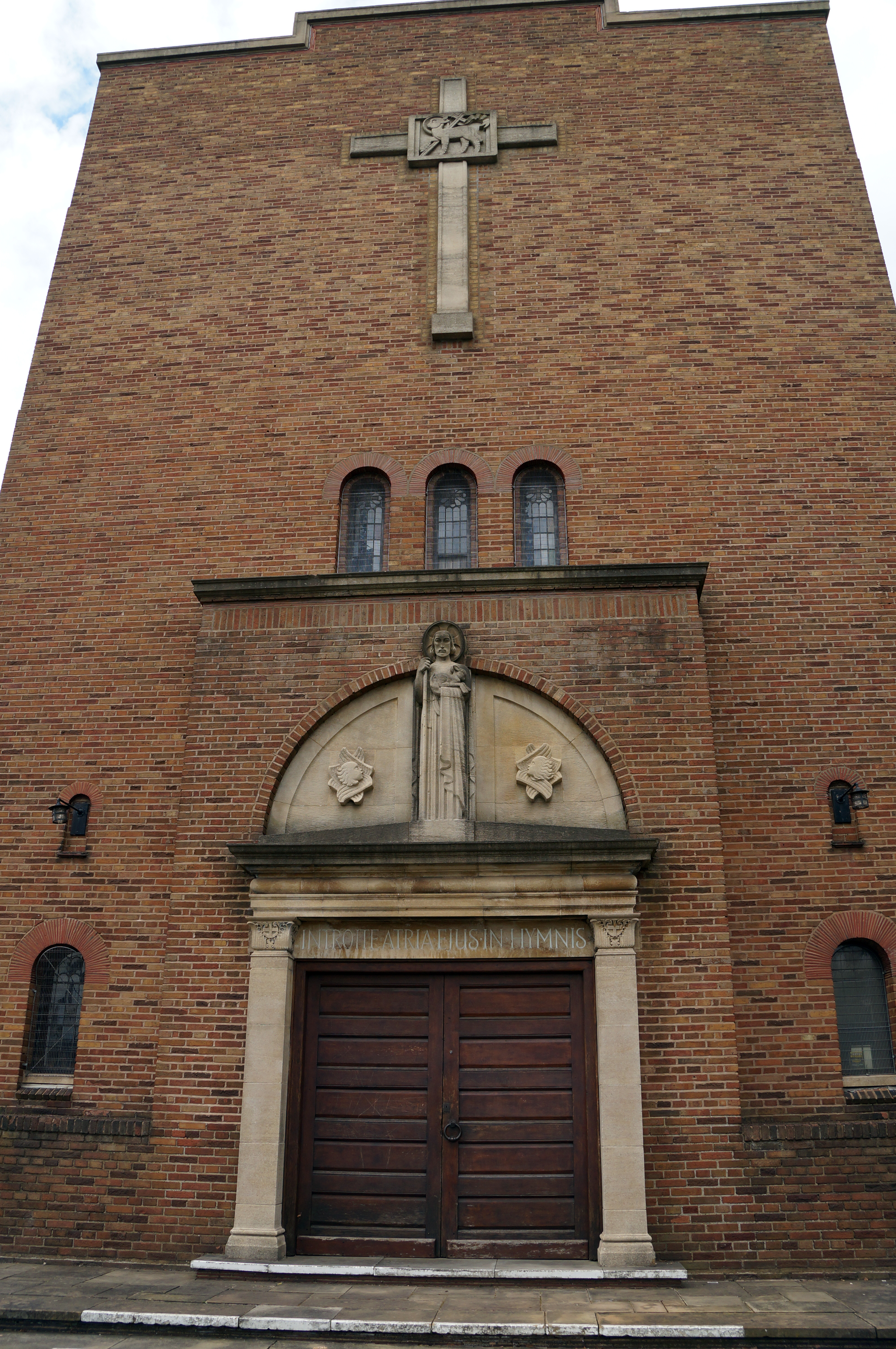
- Christ Church, Ward End
- Christ Church, Ward End
- 52°29′23.9″N 1°49′16.5″W
- OS grid reference: SP 12239 88024
- Location: Ward End
- Country: England
- Denomination: Church of England
- Website: www.ccbl.org.uk

History
- Dedication: Christ Church
- Consecrated: 29 June 1935

Architecture
- Heritage designation: Grade II listed
- Architect: Holland W. Hobbiss
- Style: Romanesque
- Groundbreaking: 4 March 1934
- Completed: 1935
- Construction cost: £11,500

Administration
- Diocese: Anglican Diocese of Birmingham
- Archdeaconry: Birmingham
- Deanery: Yardley and Bordesley
- Parish: Christ Church, Ward End

Christ Church, Ward End is a Grade II listed parish church in the Church of England in Birmingham.

== History ==
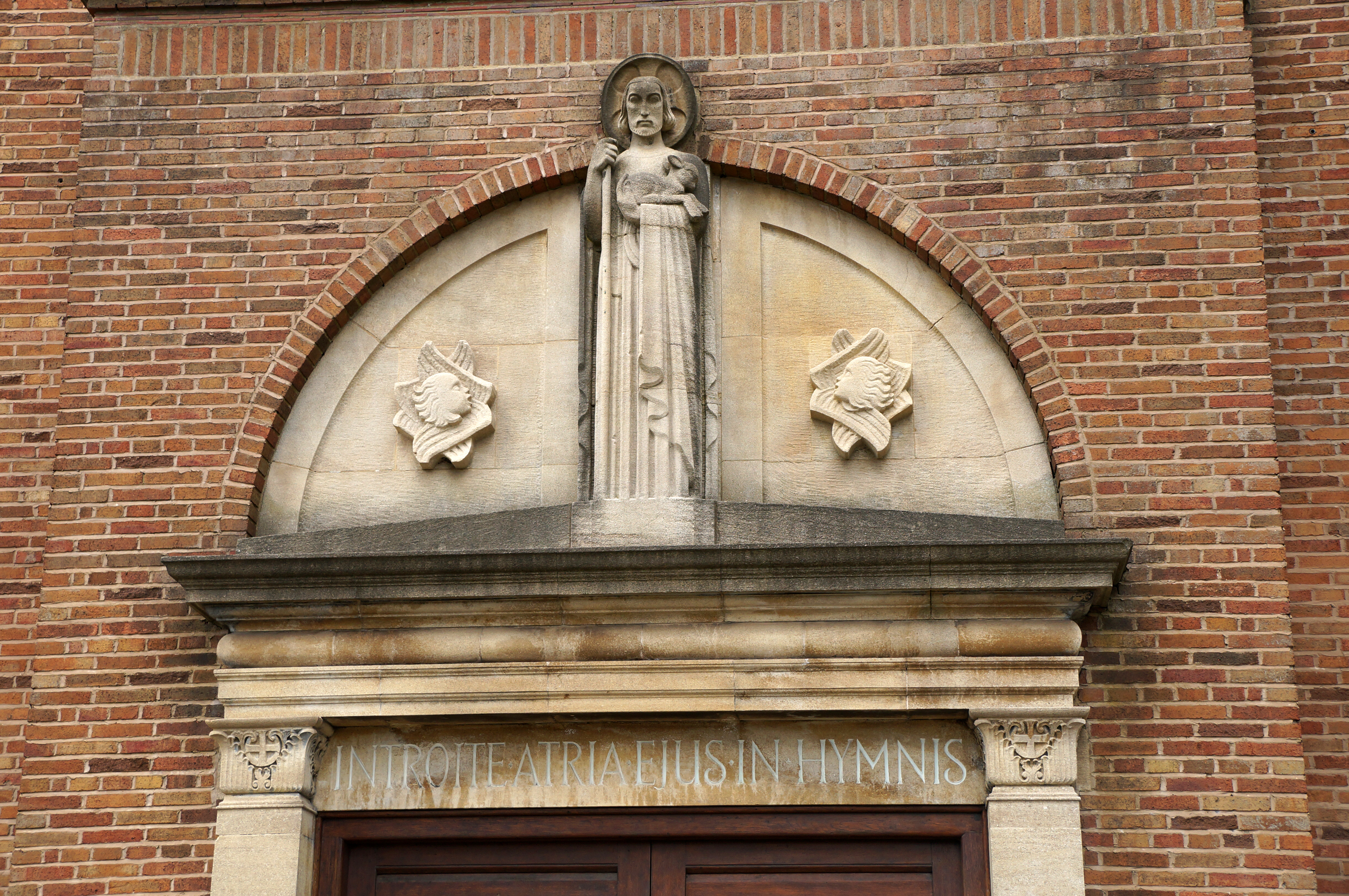
The Good Shepherd by William Bloye

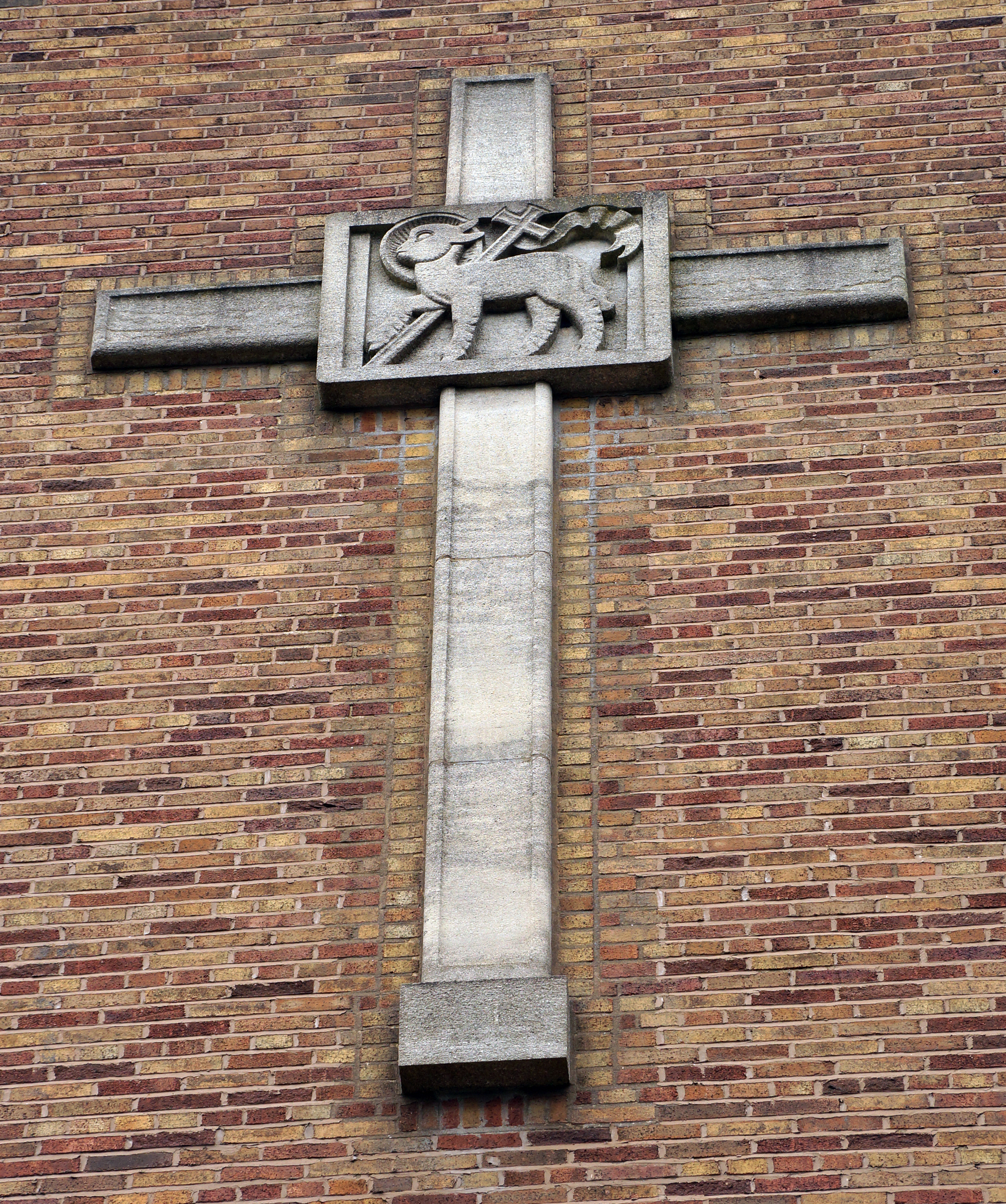
Latin Cross by William Bloye

The land on which the church was built was given by the Metropolitan Cammell Carriage and Wagon Company in the late 1920s. The first sod was cut on 4 March 1934 by Revd. W.E. Dugmore, vicar of St Margaret's Church, Ward End. The foundation stone was laid on 12 May 1934 by Rt. Revd Ernest Barnes Bishop of Birmingham in a ceremony conducted with Masonic rites, Freemasons being present from various lodges in the Warwickshire Province.

The church was built to designs by the architect Holland W. Hobbiss by the firm of William Deacon and Son of Lichfield. It was consecrated by Rt. Revd Ernest Barnes Bishop of Birmingham on 29 June 1935.

The church contains two sculptures by William Bloye.

The side chapel was fitted out in 1951 with panelling and an altar from St Stephen the Martyr's Church, Newtown Row. It became a parish in its own right on 28 May 1965.

The church hall was built in 1968 to designs of the architect Noel Hastilow.

In 2005, St Margaret's Church, Ward End was closed, and the parish was merged with Christ Church.

== Organ ==
The organ dates from 1948 and was built by Alfred E. Davies & Son Ltd. A specification of the organ can be found on the National Pipe Organ Register.
