= St Margaret's Church, Ward End =

St Margaret’s Church, Ward End
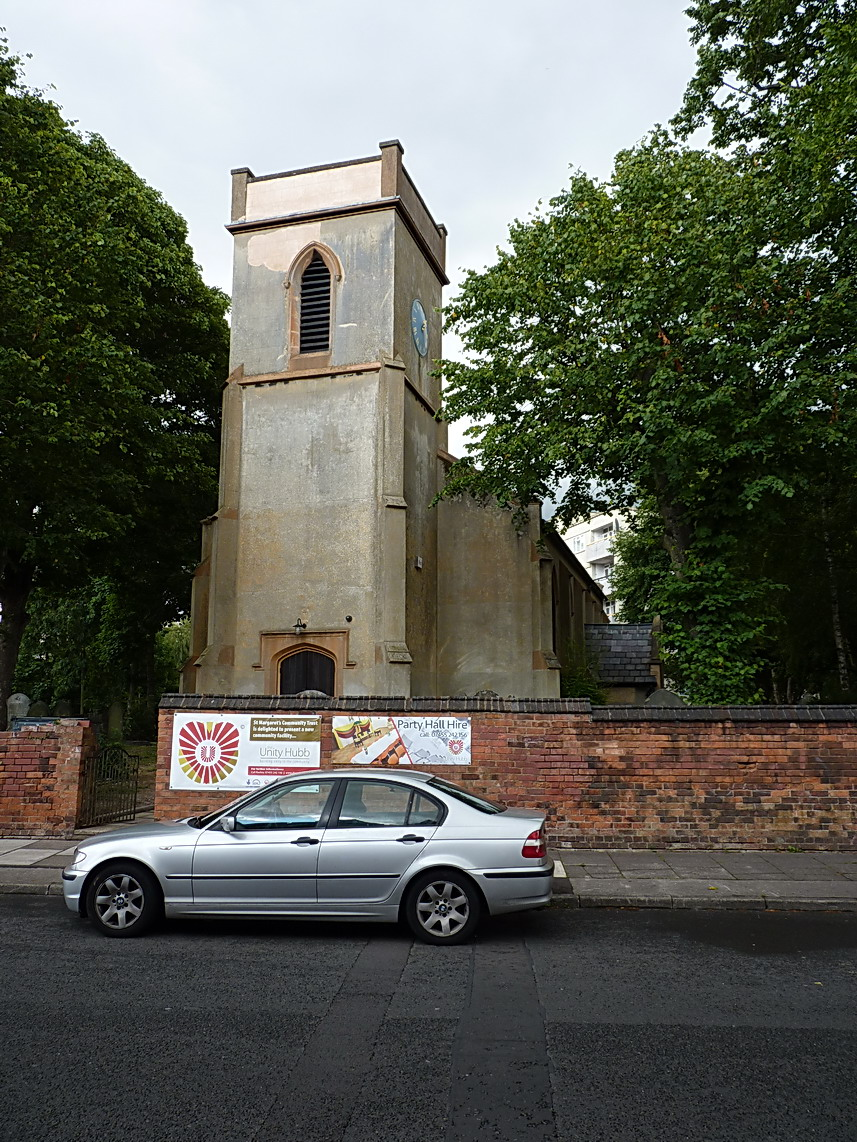
- St Margaret’s Church, Ward End
- 52°29′44″N 1°50′3.3″W
- OS grid reference: SP 11363 88642
- Location: Birmingham
- Country: England
- Denomination: Church of England

History
- Dedication: Margaret of Antioch
- Consecrated: 23 October 1841

Architecture
- Heritage designation: Grade II listed
- Completed: 1834

St Margaret's Church is a Grade II listed former Church of England parish church in Ward End, Birmingham, in the county of the West Midlands.

== History ==
The medieval church was erected in 1517 as a chapel of ease to SS Peter and Paul's Church, Aston funded by John Bond. The church may have been derelict from the reformation onwards as in 1833 an appeal was launched for its restoration.

The new church was erected and opened in 1834. It was consecrated on 23 October 1841 by the Bishop of Worcester. In 1870 land was taken from the parish of SS Peter and Paul's Church, Aston to form a new parish. Land was taken from St Margaret's parish in 1928 to form St Paul's Church, Bordesley Green, and St Mary and St John's Church, Shaw Hill in 1929.

The church was closed in 2005 and the parish was united with Christ Church, Ward End. In 2010 the St Margaret's Community Trust undertook a restoration with the help of assistant minister Rev Simon Cartwright.

== Memorials ==
- Gothic memorial to William Hutton (1723–1815), a bust by Peter Hollins of 1848

== Organ ==
An organ by J C Bishop was installed in 1845. A specification of the organ can be found on the National Pipe Organ Register.

=== Organists ===
- John Heywood 1865-1866
