= St Jude's Church, Birmingham =

St Jude’s Church, Birmingham
- St Jude’s Church, Birmingham
- 52°28′34.1″N 1°53′58.2″W
- OS grid reference: SP 06922 86470
- Location: Birmingham
- Country: England
- Denomination: Church of England

History
- Consecrated: 1851

Architecture
- Architect: Charles W Orford
- Groundbreaking: 1847
- Completed: 1851
- Demolished: 1971

Specifications
- Capacity: 1300

St Jude's Church, Birmingham was a parish church in the Church of England in Birmingham.

== History ==
The parish was formed in August 1846 from parts of the parishes of St Martin in the Bull Ring and St Philip's. Building of the church started in Hill Street in 1850 when Henry Pepys, Bishop of Worcester laid the foundation stone on 14 August. He subsequently consecrated the church on 26 July 1851. The building was of brick in the Early English style designed by Orford and Nash, consisting of a chancel, nave and aisles.

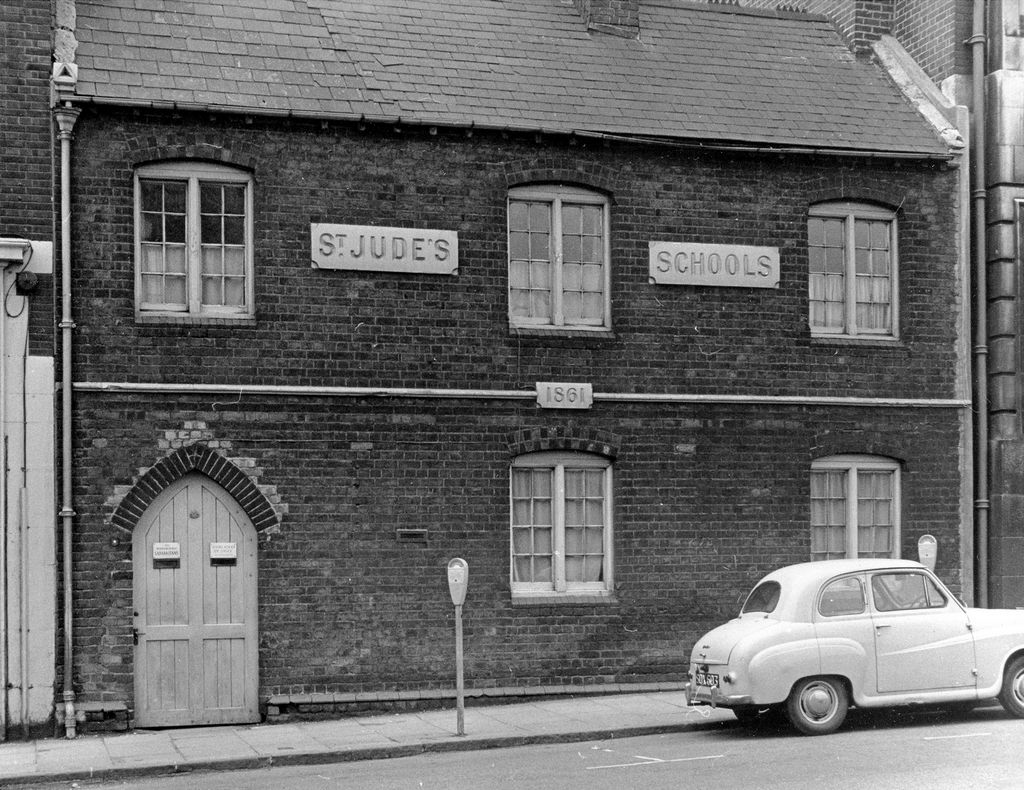
St Jude's Schools, seen in 1966

In 1861, the church opened St Jude's Schools, also on Hill Street.

A restoration project was undertaken in 1879.

In 1905, the Society of the Precious Blood was started when Mother Millicent Mary SPB (formerly Millicent Taylor) took her vows in the church.

Depopulation of the city centre resulted in declining attendance. The church eventually closed and was subsequently demolished in 1971. The site on Hill Street is now occupied by the Birmingham Conference and Events Centre, built in 1975.

== Incumbents ==
- George Davenport 1846-1856
- George Pettitt 1856-1873
- T.G. Watton 1873-1893 (formerly vicar of St Anne's Church, Duddeston)
- William Marchmant Lewis 1893-1896
- Arnold Pinchard 1896-1920
- Edward Denis Tyndall MC 1920-1941
- J. Dixon 1941-1950
- W.E. Brooke 1950-1960
- Bernard T. Croft 1960-1971

== Organ ==
The church was equipped with a pipe organ by Edward James Bossward dating from 1867. It was opened on 19 May 1867 and had 13 stops. A specification of the organ can be found on the National Pipe Organ Register.

Upon closure, the organ was transferred to Clayesmore School in Dorset, and then moved to St Michael and All Angels Church, Exeter in 2013.

=== Organists ===
- John Heywood 1863-1864
- Harold Gray 1922-1927
- Lawrence Briggs 1931-1966 (grandfather of the organist and composer David Briggs).
- Alan Walker 1966-1971
