= Birmingham Church Building Society =

- Formation: 27 November 1838
- Type: Religious
- Location: Birmingham, England

The Birmingham Church Building Society was formed in 1838 in Birmingham, England, with the purpose of building ten new churches.

== History ==
The Bishop of Worcester, Robert Carr, chaired a meeting in Birmingham on 27 November 1838, at which the Birmingham Church Building Society was formed. The objective of the society was to build ten churches in the town (as it then was) to cater for the expanding population, and as a consequence it became known as the Ten Churches Fund. Initial collections for the society were promising and quickly reached £10,000 and many people paid by regular subscription.

The Society eventually constructed 5 churches which were:

- St Matthew's Church, Duddeston and Nechells 1840
- St Mark's Church, Ladywood 1841 (demolished 1947)
- St Luke's Church, Bristol Street 1842 (rebuild 1903, demolished 2018)
- St Stephen the Martyr's Church, Newtown Row 1844 (demolished after 1950)
- St Andrew's Church, Bordesley 1846 (demolished 1985)

However, the society never lived up to its original aims, lacking sufficient funds, and it was superseded in 1865 by the Birmingham Church Extension Society.
