= Seoul Anglican Cathedral =

Cathedral Church of St Mary the Virgin and St Nicholas
- Seoul Anglican Cathedral
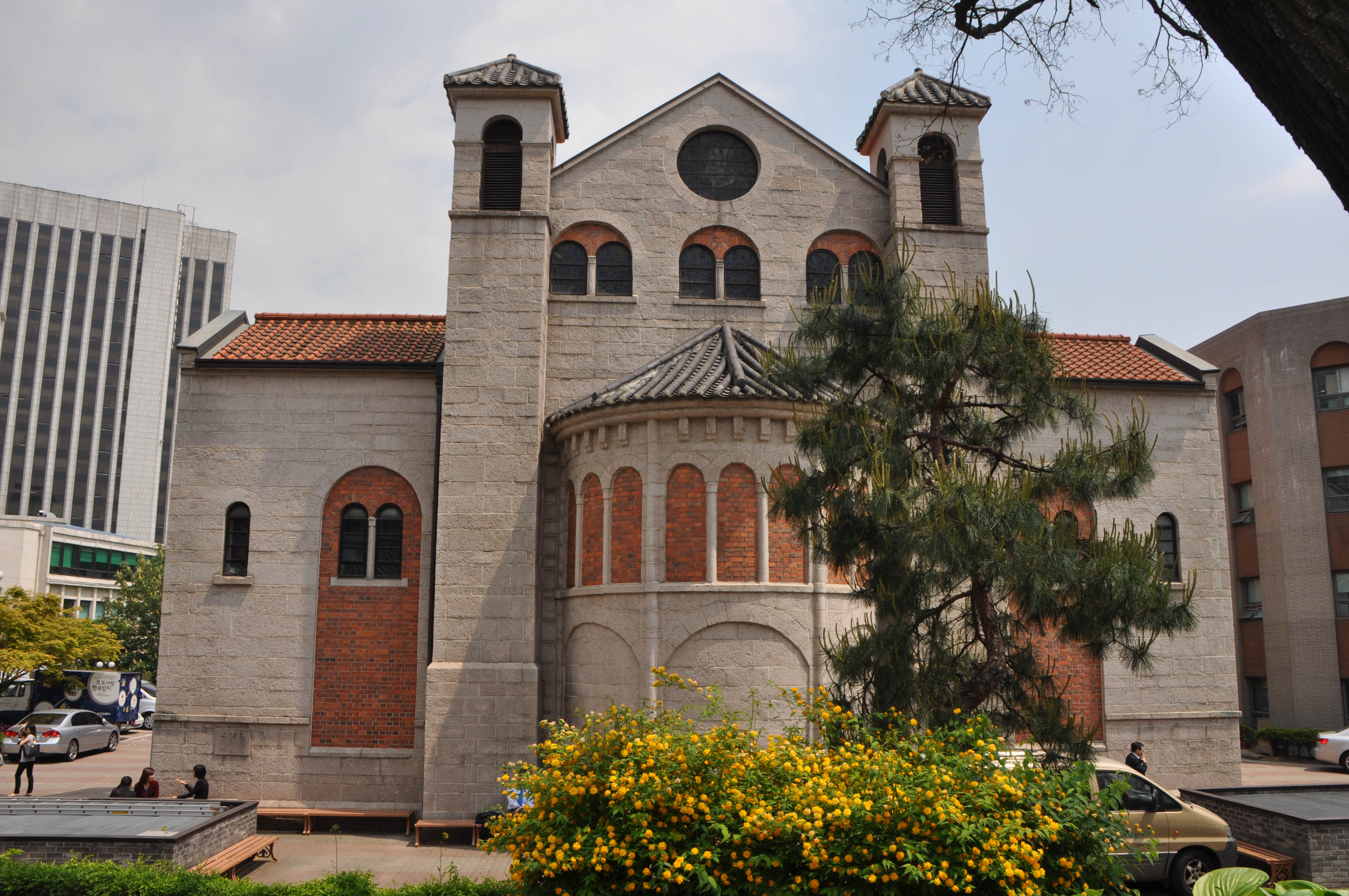
- West end of the cathedral
- Cathedral Church of St Mary the Virgin and St Nicholas
- 37°34′02″N 126°58′33″E
- Location: Seoul
- Country: South Korea
- Denomination: Anglican

Architecture
- Architect: Arthur Stansfield Dixon
- Style: Romanesque Revival
- Groundbreaking: 1922

The Cathedral Church of St Mary the Virgin and St Nicholas (Korean: 대한성공회 서울주교좌대성당), or the Seoul Anglican Cathedral, is an Anglican cathedral in Downtown Seoul, South Korea. It is the mother church of both the Anglican Church of Korea and the Diocese of Seoul. Its location is adjacent to Deoksugung, the British Embassy in Seoul, Seoul Metropolitan Council, and Seoul City Hall.

Construction began in 1922 to a design by English architect Arthur Stansfield Dixon. The Cathedral is known for its Romanesque Revival architecture, together with its mosaic murals. In 1985, a Harrison & Harrison pipe organ was installed in the Cathedral's west end. Expansion of the Cathedral began in 1991 and was completed in 1996. In 1978, the Cathedral was designated by the Seoul Metropolitan Government as Tangible Cultural Property No. 35.

== Chronology ==
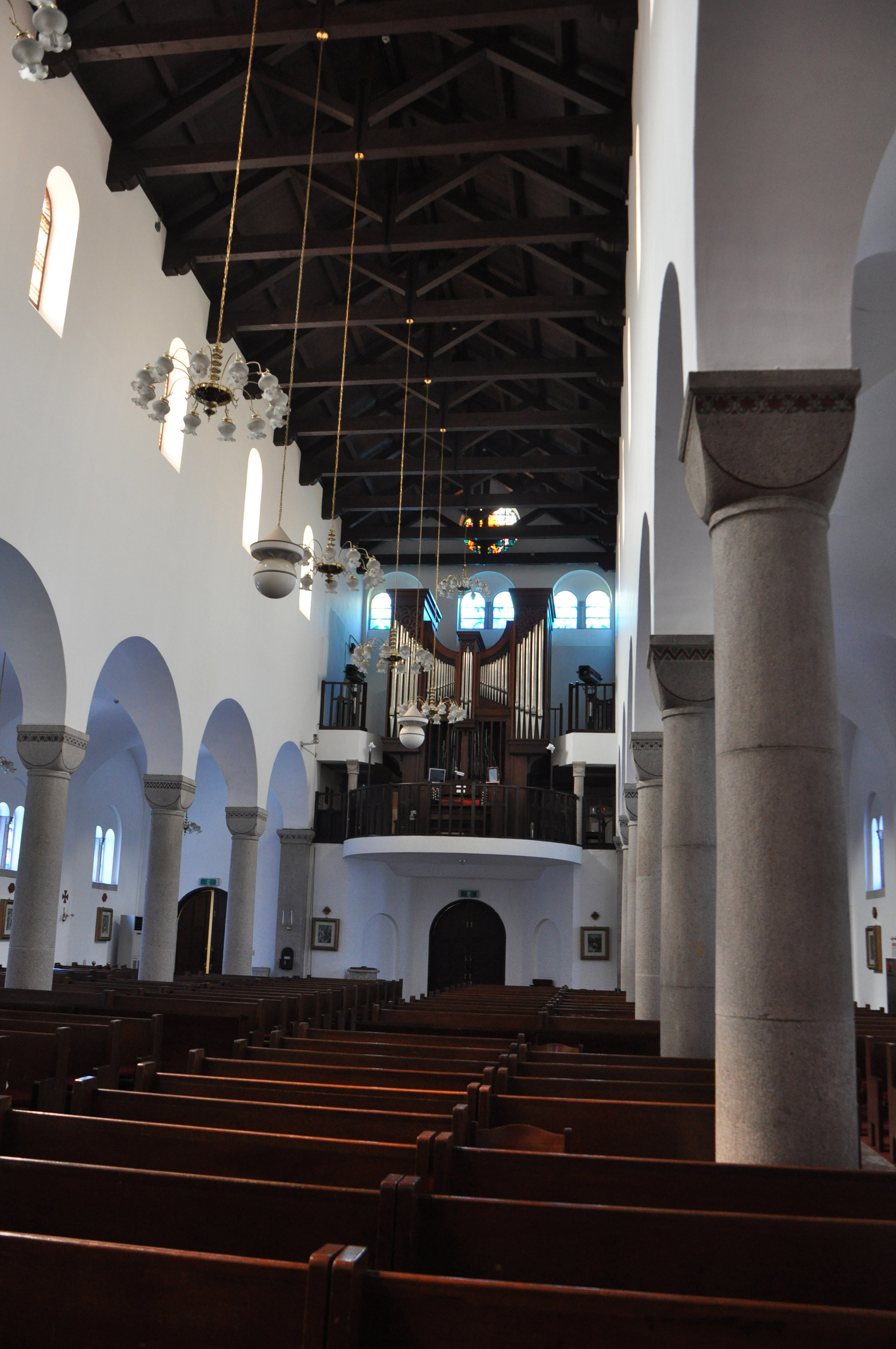
Seoul Anglican Cathedral (interior: west end, the Harrison & Harrison 1985 organ)

- 1885 - The Anglican mission to Korea began at Ganghwa Island.
- 1890 - Bishop John Corfe was consecrated in England and arrived in Seoul as bishop of the Korean Diocese.
- 1890 - Bishop John Corfe purchased the land and a traditional Korean style building on the site of the present-day Seoul Anglican Cathedral. The cathedral was founded when the first service of Holy Communion was held. Corfe consecrated the church as "Jang-rim Seong-dang" (meaning church) and began holding daily masses.
- 1909 - The Anglican Church purchased a large piece of land and finalized plans to construct the Cathedral.
- 1917 - The Church asked Arthur Dixon, a member of RIBA (Royal Institute of British Architects), to design the cathedral.
- 1922 - The construction of Seoul Anglican Cathedral began.
- 1926 - Construction came to a halt due to financial difficulties, and only about half of the original construction plan was completed.
- 1950 - The Dean and a priest of the Cathedral were taken, along with Sister Marie-Clare, by communists and martyred.
- 1965 - The Dioceses of Seoul and Daejon were separated. The first Korean bishop of the Seoul diocese was inaugurated at the Cathedral.
- 1978 - Seoul Anglican Cathedral was named Important cultural Asset No. 35.
- 1985 - A Harrison & Harrison pipe organ (with 20 stops and 2 manuals) was installed.
- 1987 - Seoul Anglican Cathedral became a key historical site of the June 10th Protest.
- 1991 - The expansion of the Cathedral began. The Seoul City Government had initially rejected plans for the expansion, but later granted permission after the original blueprints, lost during either World War II or the Korean War, were improbably rediscovered at the British Museum archives.
- May 1996 - Expansion of the Cathedral was completed.

== Rediscovery of the original blueprints ==
A British Museum worker visited the partially completed Cathedral between the late 1980s and early 1990s. After recalling that he saw that the original blueprints of the Cathedral were stored at the British Museum archives, he travelled back to England to obtain them. He returned with them to Seoul, where he presented them to the Cathedral's Parish Office.

== See also ==
- Christianity in Korea
- Anglican Communion, Anglican Church and Anglican Church of Korea
- Province, Diocese, Bishop etc.
- Seoul Anglican Cathedral English Mission
- Calendar of saints (Anglican Church of Korea)
- Ganghwa Anglican Church
