= Thomas Irvine =

Thomas Thurstan Irvine was an Anglican priest in the mid 20th Century.

He was born in Birkenhead, Cheshire on 19 June 1913, one of six children of historian William Fergusson Irvine and Lilian Davies-Colley. His brother Andrew "Sandy" Irvine and his brother's climbing partner George Mallory lost their lives while attempting the first ascent of Mount Everest in early June 1924.

He was educated at Shrewsbury School in Shropshire and Magdalen College, Oxford. Ordained after a period of study at Ripon College Cuddesdon in 1939, he was Curate at All Saints, Hertford and then Precentor of St Ninian's Cathedral, Perth. Later he was Priest in charge at Lochgelly and then held incumbencies at Bridge of Allan and Perth before becoming Dean of St Andrews, Dunkeld and Dunblane.

He died on 5 November 1985.

Religious titles
Preceded by William Shaw Andrew	Dean of St Andrews, Dunkeld and Dunblane; 1959 –1982	Succeeded by John Terence Shone
