= St Stephen the Martyr's Church, Newtown Row =

St Stephen the Martyr’s Church, Newtown Row
- St Stephen the Martyr’s Church, Newtown Row
- 52°29′42.6″N 1°53′43.5″W
- Location: Birmingham
- Country: England
- Denomination: Church of England

History
- Dedication: St Stephen
- Consecrated: 24 July 1844

Architecture
- Architect: Richard Cromwell Carpenter
- Style: Early English Gothic
- Groundbreaking: 27 September 1842
- Completed: 1844
- Construction cost: £3,200
- Closed: 1950

Specifications
- Capacity: 1,150 people

St Stephen the Martyr's Church, Newtown Row is a former Church of England parish church in Birmingham.

== History ==
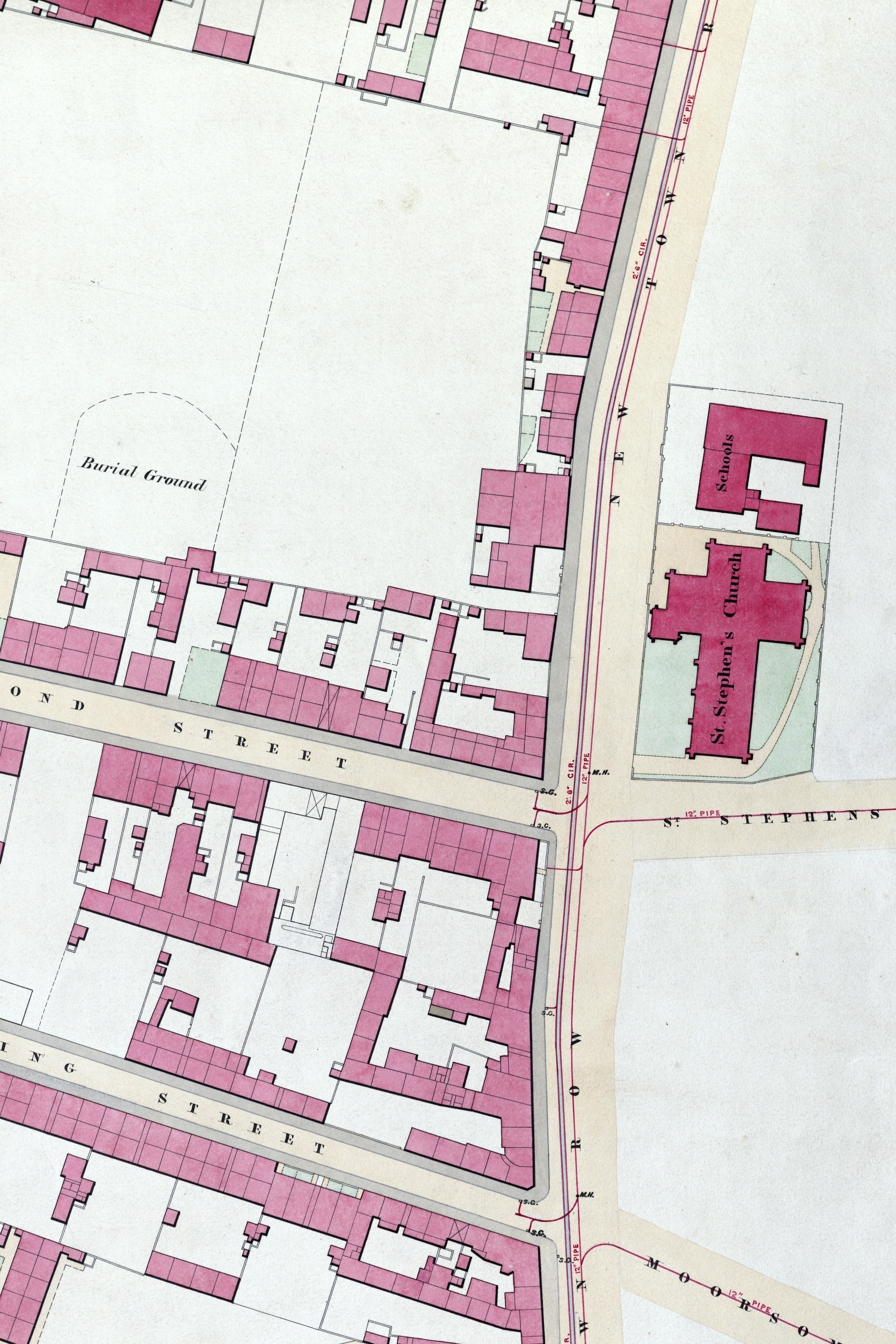
The church on the New Survey of the Borough of Birmingham of 1855 with St Stephen's Street (extant) to the south and Ormond Street and a burial ground (both now defunct, and the site of Chillwell Croft Academy) to the west

The church was funded by the governors of King Edward's School, Birmingham and built by the Birmingham Church Building Society to designs by the architect Richard Cromwell Carpenter. It was consecrated by the Bishop of Worcester on 24 July 1844.

In 1869 part of the parish was taken to form a new parish for St Nicolas' Church, Hockley.

In 1890 the vicar made liturgical changes to the service, replacing “Psalms and Hymns” with “Hymns Ancient and Modern”, put the choir in surplices, and set the church Ad orientem. which caused a rift amongst some dissident members of the congregation. Some members left and formed an Evangelical Mission in Ormond Street.

A major restoration was undertaken in 1896, and the church was rebuilt in 1910 by William Bidlake.

In 1896, the parish purchased New John Street West Presbyterian church as a mission room, which two years later was consecrated as St Edward's Church, Hockley.

The church was closed in 1950 and demolished. The parish was united with that of St Mary's Church, Aston Brook. Some of the paneling was reused in Christ Church, Ward End and the altar taken to St Boniface, Quinton.

As of 2025, the site is occupied by Royal Mail's Birmingham Mail Centre.

== Vicars ==
- John Garbett 1844 - 1848
- Stenton Eardley 1848 - 1854
- Patrick Reynolds 1854 - 1890
- G.H. Cameron 1890 - 1900 (formerly senior curate of St George's Church, Edgbaston)
- J.T. Jones 1900 - 1907 (afterwards vicar of Holy Trinity Church, Birchfield)
- Tom Stephenson Dennison 1907 - ????
- Harry Dickinson 1917 (killed in action during the First World War)
- F.W. Chambers 1918 - 1920 (formerly vicar of St Alban's Mission Church, Cowley St John, Oxford)
- Edward Lewis Blood 1920 - 1948 (formerly vicar of St Margaret's Church, Ladywood)

== Organ ==
On 12 September 1847, the third anniversary of the consecration of the church, a new organ by Banfield was opened.

=== Organists ===
- William Akers Edwards 1846 - 1851
- William C. Stockley 1851-1856 (afterwards organist of St Mary's Church, Whittall Street, Birmingham)
