= Alfred Watt =

Scottish priest

Alfred Ian Watt was an Anglican priest in the second half of the 20th century.

He was born in 1934, trained at Edinburgh Theological College and was ordained in 1960. Initially a curate at St Paul's Cathedral, Dundee, he was then Rector of Arbroath before becoming Provost of St Ninian's Cathedral, Perth in 1969. After 13 years in post he became Rector of St Paul's Kinross before his appointment as Dean of St Andrews, Dunkeld and Dunblane. He retired in 1998.

Religious titles
Preceded by Wilfred Bennetto Currie	Provost of St Ninian's Cathedral, Perth; 1969 –1982	Succeeded by Graham John Thompson Forbes
Preceded by John Terence Shone	Dean of St Andrews, Dunkeld and Dunblane; 1989 –1998	Succeeded by Randall George Leslie MacAlister
