= Robert Brudenell (judge) =

English judge (1461–1531)

Sir Robert Brudenell KS (1461 – 30 January 1531) was an English justice. He entered Inner Temple in 1480 and gave his first reading in 1490 on the subject of De donis conditionalibus, followed by a second reading in 1500. He became governor of the inn in 1496, and before 1503 served as treasurer. In 1503 he was also made a Serjeant-at-law, followed by a promotion to King's Serjeant in 1504 and an appointment as a puisne justice of the King's Bench in 1507. At some point he was knighted, and on 23 April 1520 he was sent "sideways" to become Chief Justice of the Common Pleas, remaining until 22 November 1530. He died on 30 January 1531, leaving a son, Thomas; his great-grandson later became Earl of Cardigan.

Legal offices
Preceded by Sir John Ernley	Chief Justice of the Common Pleas; 1520–1530	Succeeded by Sir Robert Norwich
