= St Nicolas' Church, Hockley =

St Nicolas’ Church, Hockley
- St Nicolas’ Church, Hockley
- 52°29′26.1″N 1°53′48.3″W
- Location: Birmingham
- Country: England
- Denomination: Church of England

History
- Dedication: St Nicolas
- Consecrated: 21 July 1868

Architecture
- Architect: Martin & Chamberlain
- Groundbreaking: 15 October 1867
- Completed: 1868

Specifications
- Capacity: 1,150 people
- Length: 105 feet (32 m)
- Width: 57 feet (17 m)
- Height: 77 feet (23 m)

St Nicolas’ Church, Lower Tower Street, Hockley is a former Church of England parish church in Birmingham.

== History ==
The church was designed by the Birmingham firm of architects, Martin & Chamberlain. It was consecrated on 24 October 1860 by the Bishop of Worcester. The parish was formed in 1869, from land taken from that of St Stephen the Martyr's Church, Newtown Row.

The church was closed for repairs in 1890, and reopened on 30 August 1890, having been redecorated by J.R. Lee and Co to the designs of Cotton and Bidlake.

In 1942, the church of St Edward on New John Street West was closed, and the parishes were united.

The church was closed in 1947 with the parish being merged back into St George in the Fields, Hockley.

== Organ ==
The organ was installed by Stringer. It was renovated as part of the major redecoration scheme in 1890. A specification of the organ can be found on the National Pipe Organ Register.
