= Wilfred Currie =

Scottish Anglican priest

Wilfred Bennetto Currie was an Anglican priest in the 20th century.

Educated at the University of Edinburgh and ordained in 1933, Currie was a curate at St John's Aberdeen and then Priest in charge of St Mark's in the same city. He was a Chaplain to the British armed forces during World War II after which he held incumbencies at Longside and Stirling before he became Provost of St Ninian's Cathedral, Perth in 1955, a post he held until 1969.

Church of England titles
Preceded by Denis Tyndall	Provost of St Ninian’s Cathedral, Perth; 1955–1969	Succeeded by Alfred Watt
