= John Heywood (organist) =

John Heywood (1841–1915) was an organist and composer based in Birmingham, England.

== Life ==
He was born in Birmingham in 1841, the son of John Heywood (b. 1812) and Dianah Brittain (b. 1815).

He was a light-comedy actor, first playing with the Bordesley Literary Union from 1868 to 1877, and then in local amateur companies.

He died in Birmingham on 16 May 1915 and was buried in Lodge Hill Cemetery.

== Career ==
Heywood was a pupil of the organist John Chapman, organist of St Thomas’ Church, Birmingham, studying piano and organ, later studying under Charles Steggall and Walter Macfarren in London.

On returning to Birmingham he was appointed organist of:

- St Jude's Church, Birmingham 1863–1864
- St Mary's Church, Aston Brook 1864–1865
- St Margaret's Church, Ward End 1865–1866
- St Paul's Church, Balsall Heath 1866–1915

He was organist and choirmaster to the Church Choral Association of the Archdeaconry of Coventry from 1871 to 1895, after which he became its choir inspector.

Heywood was the composer of a number of anthems and festal choral settings. His anthems included “Try me, O God” and “I am the Lord”.

A single chant in E-flat was published in Cathedral Psalter Chants (1875). His hymn tunes 'Aston' and 'St Luke' were included in Hymns Ancient and Modern (1916).

== Publications ==
- Anglican Psalter Noted (1864) Metzler and Co.
- Choral Office of Matins and Evensong (1876)
- Our Church Hymnody (1881)
- The Art of Chanting (1893) William Clowes and Sons
