= Robert Norwich =

British justice

Sir Robert Norwich KS JP (died April 1535) was an English justice. He was a member of Lincoln's Inn, and is first mentioned practicing in the Court of Requests in 1516, followed by service in his home county of Essex as a commissioner in 1518. The same year he became a Bencher of his Inn, also giving his first reading, and acted as the Treasurer from 1519 to 1520. He was created a Serjeant-at-law in 1521, followed by a promotion to King's Serjeant a year later and, in 1525, an appointment as a Justice of the Peace, again for Essex. In 1529 he was knighted and appointed Surveyor of the King's Liveries, along with Sir Thomas Nevill, an office he held until his death. He was made Chief Justice of the Common Pleas on 22 November 1530, although there are few records of his character or career as Chief Justice. He died in April 1535, and was buried in St Nicholas's Chapel near Serjeant's Inn.

Legal offices
Preceded by Sir Robert Brudenell	Chief Justice of the Common Pleas; 1530–1535	Succeeded by Sir John Baldwin
