= St Edward's Church, Hockley =

St Edward’s Church, Hockley
- St Edward’s Church, Hockley
- 52°29′35.8″N 1°54′1.1″W
- Location: Birmingham
- Country: England
- Denomination: Church of England
- Previous denomination: Presbyterian

History
- Dedication: St Edward
- Consecrated: 1898

Architecture
- Completed: 19 June 1857

St Edward's Church, New John Street West, Hockley is a former Church of England parish church in Birmingham.

== History ==
The building was constructed as a Presbyterian chapel and opened on 19 June 1857 by Revd. James Hamilton of London. It was obtained by St Stephen the Martyr's Church, Newtown Row in 1896 as a mission room and consecrated as a church in its own right in 1898.

Land was taken from the parishes of St Stephen the Martyr's Church, Newtown Row and St Matthias' Church, Farm Street, Birmingham in 1899 to form a new parish.

In 1942 the church was merged with St Nicolas' Church, Hockley and then with St George in the Fields, Hockley.
