= St Paul's Church, Hamstead =

St Paul's Church
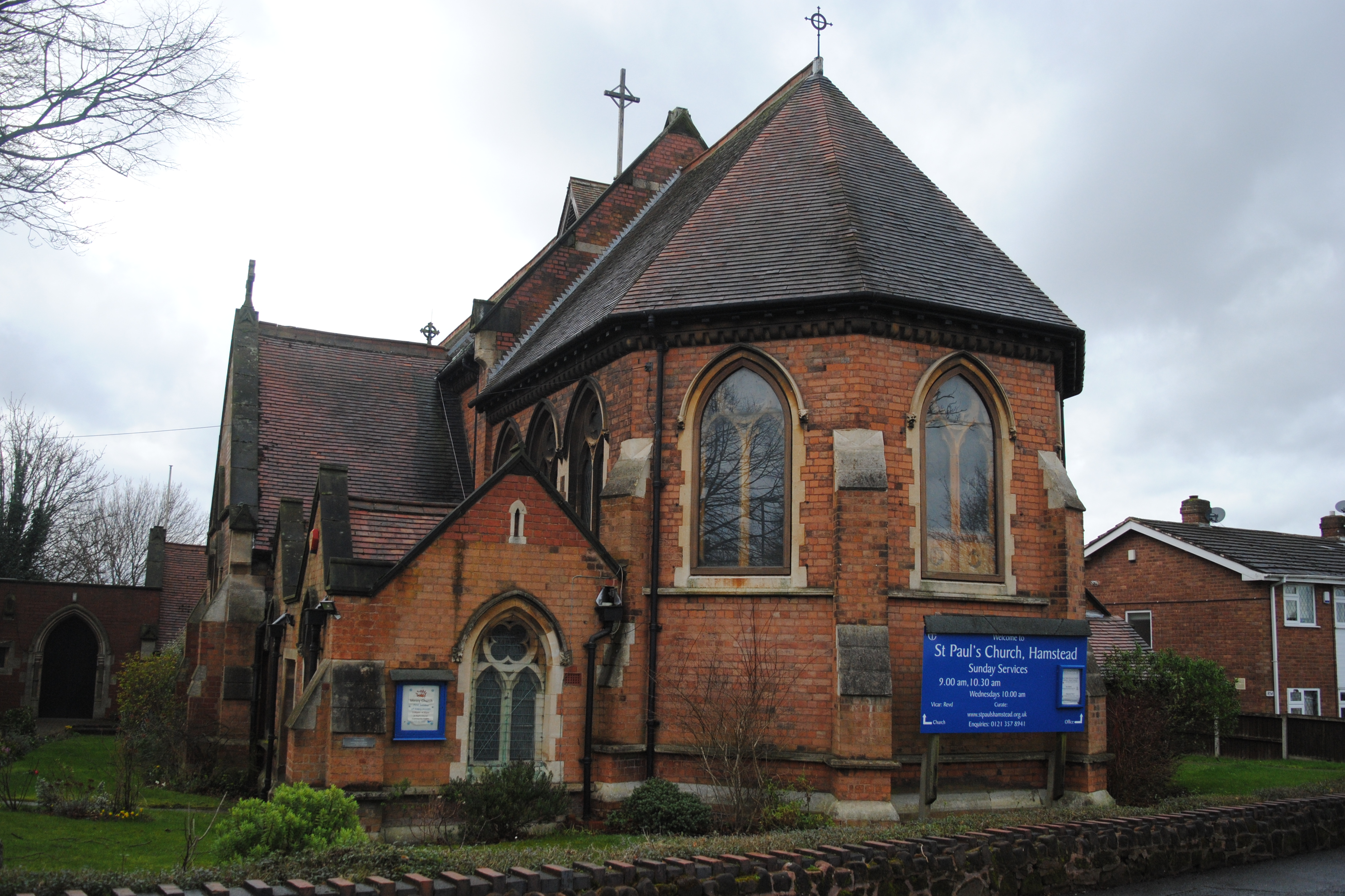
- St. Paul's in February 2020
- St Paul's Church
- 52°32′30.9″N 1°55′43.4″W
- OS grid reference: SP 04920 93781
- Location: Hamstead, Birmingham
- Country: England
- Denomination: Church of England
- Website: www.stpaulshamstead.org.uk

History
- Dedication: St Paul
- Consecrated: 29 September 1892

Architecture
- Heritage designation: Grade II listed
- Architect: William Davis
- Groundbreaking: 27 July 1891
- Completed: 1892
- Construction cost: £3,400

Specifications
- Capacity: 450 persons
- Length: 95 feet (29 m)
- Width: 40 feet (12 m)
- Materials: Brick

Administration
- Diocese: Anglican Diocese of Birmingham
- Archdeaconry: Birmingham
- Deanery: Handsworth
- Parish: St Paul Hamstead

St Paul's Church, Hamstead is a Grade II listed Church of England parish church in Birmingham, England.

== Location ==
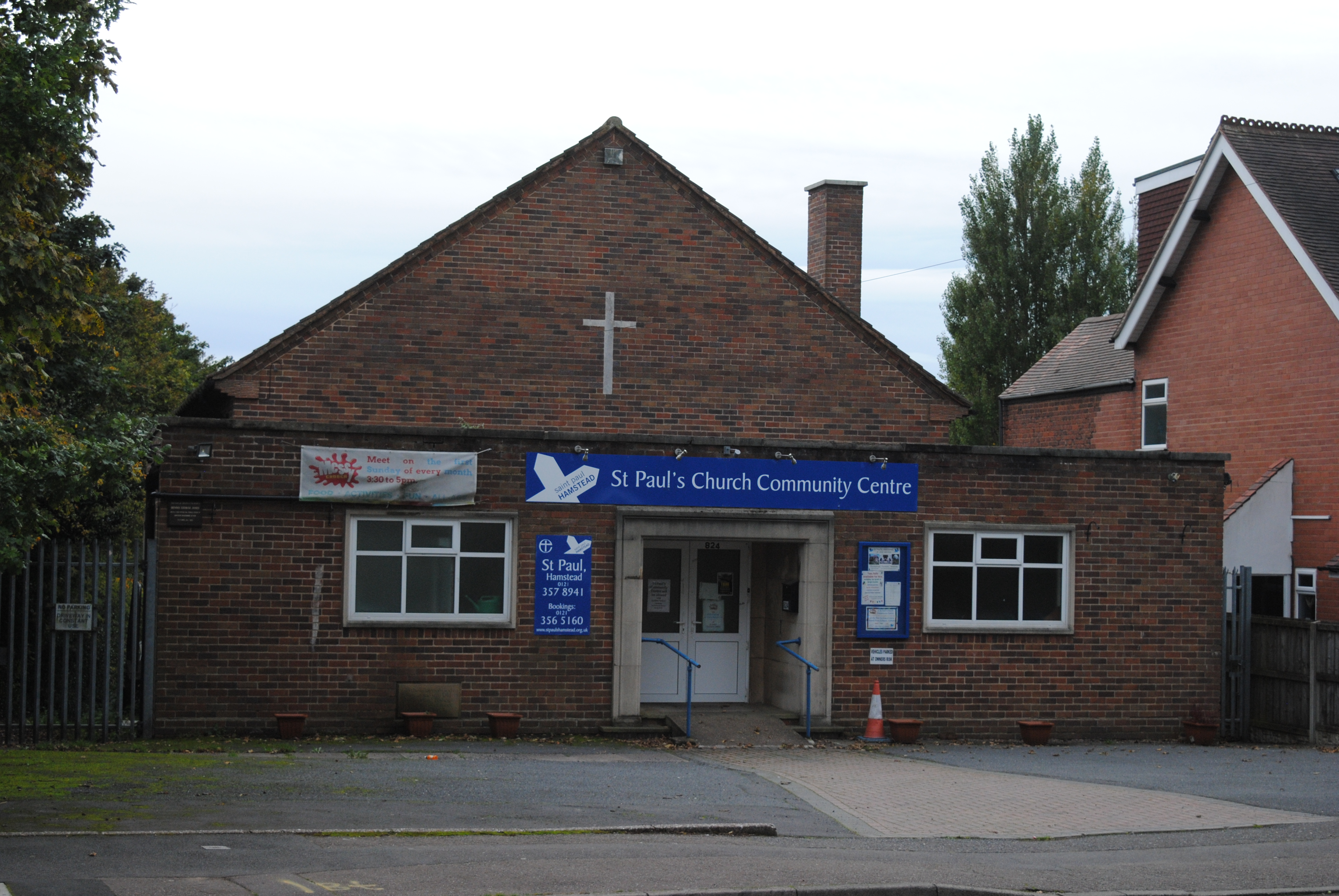
St Paul's Church Hall

The church sits west of the A34 Walsall Road, near its junction with Old Walsall Road, on a hilltop site overlooking the suburb of Hamstead, a former mining village, and not far from the border of Birmingham and Sandwell. At the time of the church's construction its site was part of Staffordshire. In 1928 it was incorporated into Birmingham, and thus also Warwickshire, and, from 1974, the West Midlands county.

The church's community hall sits a few yards further south along the A34.

== History ==
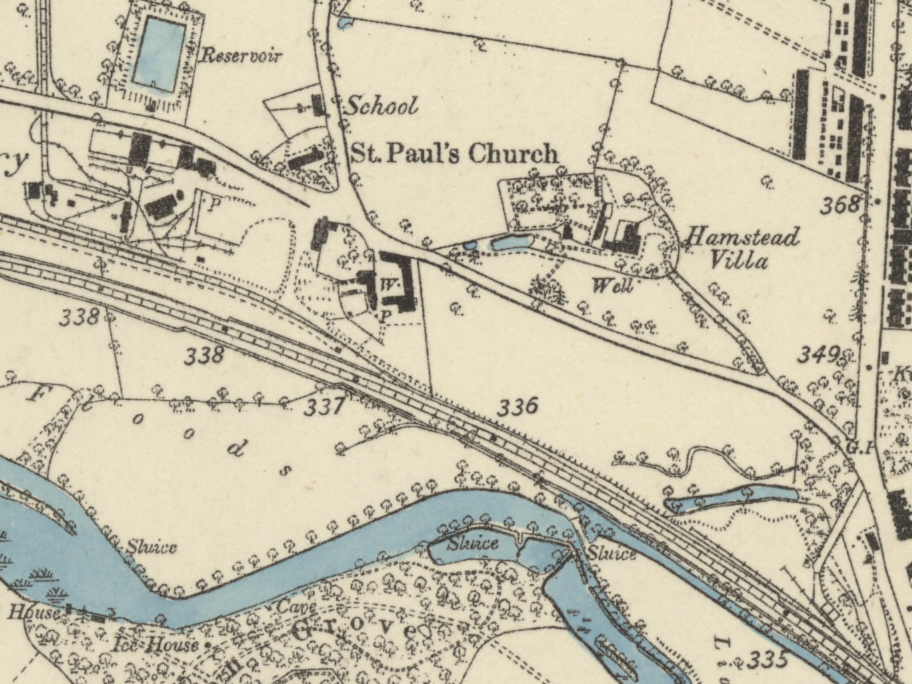
The mission church on an Ordnance Survey map of Staffordshire, sheet LXVIII.NE, published in 1886. It is located between Hamstead Colliery to the west and Hamstead Villa - both now also defunct - at the junction of what are now Hamstead Road and Spouthouse Lane, and to the north of the Grand Junction Railway line and River Tame.

The church originated as a mission church in 1865, closer to Hamstead village. Eventually funding was found for a permanent church and the foundation stone was laid on Friday 27 July 1891 by Augustus Gough-Calthorpe, 6th Baron Calthorpe. The church was built to the designs of the architect William Davis. It comprised nave, north and south transepts, north and south aisles and a chancel. It was built of red brick with Bathstone dressings. The contractors were Harley and Son of Smethwick. It was consecrated on 29 September 1892 by Augustus Legge, the Bishop of Lichfield. Pevsner and Wedgwood (1966) describe the building as "A pleasant country church in a Dec[orated] style".

In 1894 a parish was assigned with land taken from the parishes of St Mary's Church, Handsworth and St John the Evangelist's Church, Perry Barr.

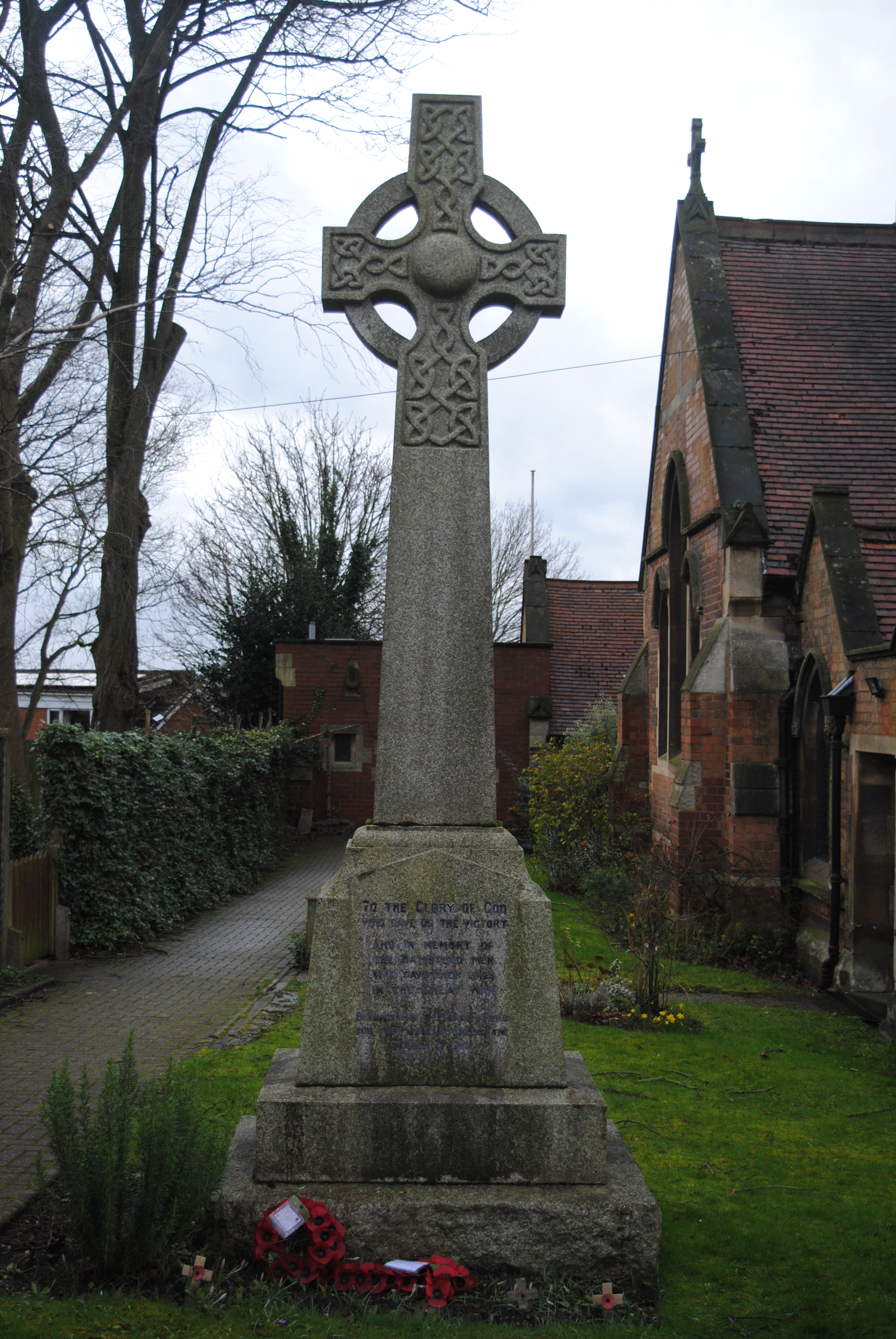
Hamstead War Memorial

Hamstead War Memorial stands next to the church. Erected by public subscription in December 1920, it commemorates 22 men of the parish who died in World War I. It has the shape of a Celtic wheel-cross and is also Grade II listed.
