= William Andrew (priest) =

Anglican priest

William Shaw Andrew MC (6 February 1884 – 19 July 1963) was an Anglican priest in the mid 20th Century.

He was born on 6 February 1884 and educated at Sheffield Grammar School and Wadham College, Oxford. Ordained in 1909, he held curacies at St Luke the Evangelist, Walton-on-the-Hill and St Michael, Beccles. He was a Temporary Chaplain to the Forces during World War I. Later he held incumbencies at Boxford and St Andrews. before becoming Dean of St Andrews, Dunkeld and Dunblane.

He died on 19 July 1963.

Religious titles
Preceded by Piers Holt Wilson	Dean of St Andrews, Dunkeld and Dunblane; 1943–1959	Succeeded by Thomass Thurstan Irvine
