= St Lawrence's Church, Duddeston =

St Lawrence’s Church, Duddeston
- St Lawrence’s Church, Duddeston
- 52°29′20.8″N 1°53′10.1″W
- OS grid reference: SP 07730 87957
- Location: Birmingham
- Country: England
- Denomination: Church of England

History
- Dedication: St Lawrence
- Consecrated: 25 June 1868

Architecture
- Architect: J. A. Chatwin
- Groundbreaking: 20 June 1867
- Completed: 1868
- Construction cost: £4,347
- Closed: 1951

Specifications
- Capacity: 750 people
- Length: 95.5 feet (29.1 m)
- Width: 55.6 feet (16.9 m)

St Lawrence's Church, Dartmouth Street, Duddeston is a former Church of England parish church in Birmingham.

== History ==
The foundation stone was laid on 20 June 1867 by the Bishop of Worcester.

The funding of the church was provided by Miss Louisa Ann Ryland. The church was designed by J. A. Chatwin and built in brick, with the tracery of the windows in Corsham Down Bath stone. The contractor was Charles Jones of Belmont Row, Birmingham. It was consecrated on 25 June 1868 by the Bishop of Worcester. A parish was assigned out of St Matthew's Church, Duddeston and Nechells in 1868.

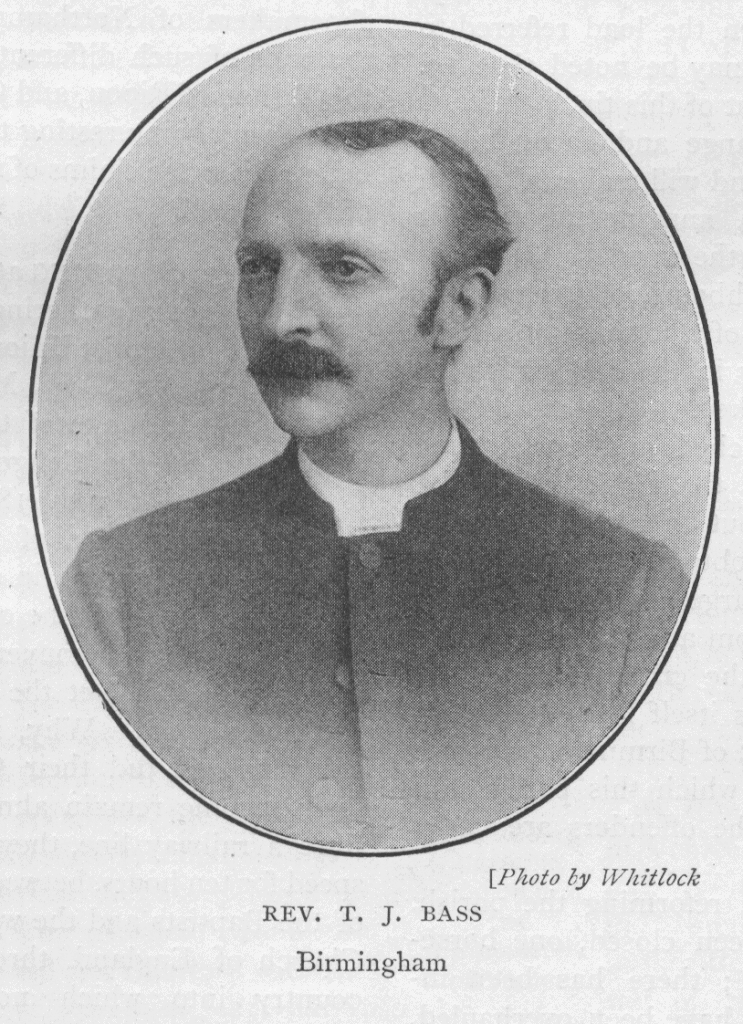
Thomas J. Bass, circa 1903

Thomas J. Bass, vicar at St Lawrence's from 1897 to 1925, was an author and outspoken critic of poverty and slums. He also served as secretary of the city's Sanitary Aid Committee.

Alterations were undertaken in 1894 and 1895.

The church was closed in 1951 and the parish was reunited with St Matthew's Church, Duddeston and Nechells.

== Organ ==
An organ by Halmshaw was installed. A specification of the organ can be found on the National Pipe Organ Register.
