= John Shone =

John Terence Shone (born 1935) was the Dean of the United Diocese of St Andrews, Dunkeld and Dunblane from 1982 to 1989.

He was born on 15 May 1935 and educated at St Dunstan's College and Selwyn College, Cambridge. Ordained in 1961, he was Curate at St Pancras Parish Church and then Chaplain of St Andrew's Cathedral, Aberdeen. After three years as a Lecturer at Aberdeen College of Education he held Incumbencies in Grimsby, Bridge of Allan, Alloa and Dollar

Religious titles
Preceded by Thomass Thurstan Irvine	Dean of St Andrews, Dunkeld and Dunblane; 1982 –1989	Succeeded by Alfred Ian Watt
