= Burnham Abbey =

Monastery in Buckinghamshire, England

Coordinates: 51.51550°N 0.66071°W

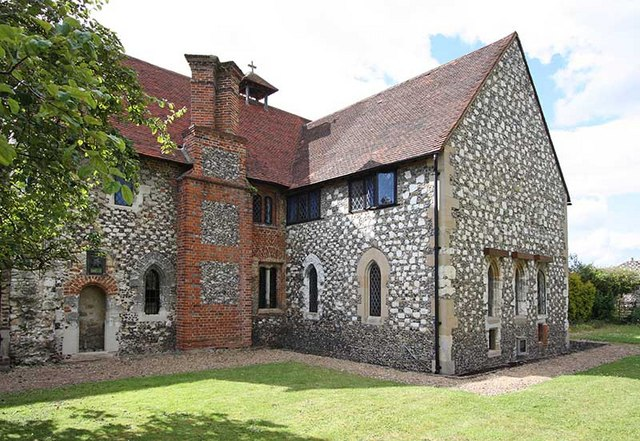
- Burnham Abbey with the present chapel on the right
- Interactive map of Burnham Abbey

Monastery information
- Full name: The Abbey of St Mary the Virgin at Burnham
- Order: Augustinian Canonesses
- Established: 1266
- Disestablished: 1539
- Dedication: Virgin Mary
- Diocese: Lincoln

People
- Founders: Richard, Earl of Cornwall, King of the Romans,

Site
- Location: Burnham, Buckinghamshire, England
- Visible remains: chapter house, sacristy, parts of the frater and infirmary

Burnham Abbey was a house of Augustinian canonesses regular near Burnham in Buckinghamshire, England. It was founded in 1266 by Richard, 1st Earl of Cornwall. The abbey of St Mary consisted of around twenty nuns at the outset, but was never wealthy and by the time of its dissolution in 1539 there were only ten.

Since 1916 the surviving buildings have been the home of an Anglican contemplative community, the Society of the Precious Blood who retain the name "Burnham Abbey".

== History ==
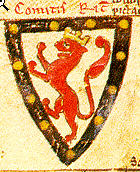
Arms of the founder, Richard, Earl of Cornwall, as drawn by his contemporary Matthew Paris

The abbey was founded in 1265/6 by Richard, Earl of Cornwall, styled King of the Romans, the brother of King Henry III. Richard endowed it with several manors, including the manor of Burnham, and 'land appurtenant to the manor of Cippenham with a mill, fishery and other rights'. The abbey was situated about a half mile from Burnham. A complaint was made shortly after the foundation that Richard had diverted a watercourse to the abbey that had been used by a nearby village and that he also had given 20 acres (81,000 m^{2}) of common land to the monastery. It is unknown whether this issue was resolved.

In 1311 a nun, Margery of Hedsor, left the monastery and her vows and was subsequently excommunicated. This sentence was renewed periodically for some years until it was cancelled by the Bishop for reasons unknown.

A serious legal dispute occurred in 1330, concerning the ownership of the manor of Bulstrode, which had been granted to the abbey but was claimed by a Geoffrey de Bulstrode, who in protest proceeded to vandalise the property and harass the servants of the abbess. Eventually a commission found in favour of the abbey, but by then there had been substantial losses.

== Seizure ==
Having few assets, Burnham Abbey should have been closed in the first wave of the Dissolution of the Monasteries in 1536, but a petition by local commissioners delayed its end until 1539. The document of surrender, dated 19 September 1539, was signed by Alice Baldwin, as Abbess, and the nine remaining nuns. There were also two priests. At the dissolution, the Abbey's revenues were estimated at £51 2s 4-1/2d. The Abbess was granted a small pension and appears to have spent her remaining years at Aylesbury at the home of her father, Sir John Baldwin, Lord Chief Justice of the Common Pleas.

== Later ownership ==
In 1544 a grant of the site of the abbey was made to William Tyldesley, a Groom of the Chamber, and in 1574 Queen Elizabeth granted a lease of the property to Paul Wentworth, who had married Tyldesley's widow, Helen. In 1569, Thomas Howard, 4th Duke of Norfolk, was detained there before being sent to the Tower of London. The church was demolished in about 1570 and a house was formed from much of the remaining buildings. By 1719, it was a farm with some of the buildings such as the refectory in poor condition.

In 1913 James Lawrence Bissley, an architect and surveyor, purchased the property and restored the remaining buildings, converting the original chapter house into a chapel. In 1916 he sold the property to the Society of the Precious Blood, a community of Anglican Augustinian nuns, who took possession and began to restore and extend the abbey for their use.

The Abbey is a Grade I listed building, while the associated walls and structures are Grade II. The chapter house, sacristy, and parts of the frater and infirmary remain of the medieval nunnery.

== Gallery ==
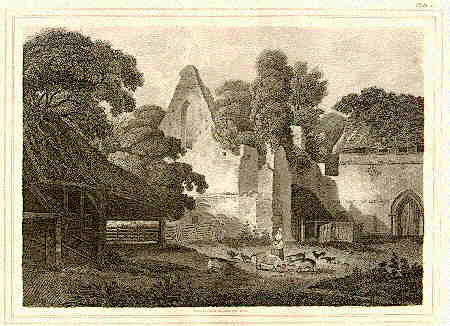
Ruins of Burnham Abbey (from The New British Traveller, 1819)

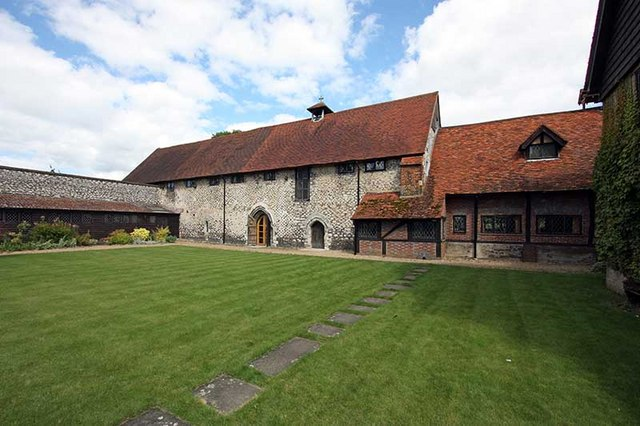
Burnham Abbey, current buildings

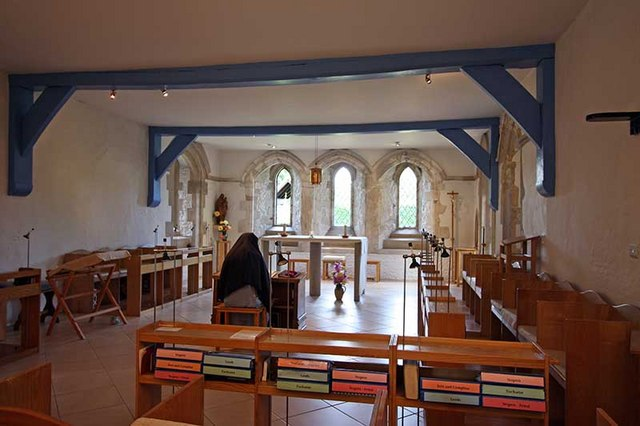
Nun at prayer in the chapel

== See also ==
- List of monastic houses in Buckinghamshire
- List of monastic houses in England
