= John Baldwin (judge) =

Member of the Parliament of England

Sir John Baldwin
- Born: Before 1470
- Died: 24 October 1545
- Burial place: Aylesbury, Buckinghamshire
- Spouses: Agnes Dormer; Agnes Norris
- Children: William Baldwin; Agnes Baldwin; Pernell Baldwin; Sylvester c Baldwin; Alice Baldwin
- Parent(s): William Baldwin, Jane (maiden name unknown)

Sir John Baldwin (died 24 October 1545) was an English lawyer and chief justice of the Common Pleas.

== Family ==
According to Baker, John Baldwin, born 11 August 1470, was a younger son of William Baldwin (died c.1479) of Aylesbury, Buckinghamshire, and Agnes Dormer, the daughter of William Dormer of West Wycombe, Buckinghamshire. However, according to The Visitation of Buckinghamshire and other sources, Agnes Dormer, the daughter of William Dormer (d.1506) of West Wycombe, was John Baldwin's first wife, not his mother.

Baldwin is said to have had an elder brother, Richard Baldwin (d.1484).

Baldwin's uncle, also named John Baldwin (d. 1469), had a legal career in London as a bencher of Gray's Inn and common serjeant of the city. At his death in 1469 his estates in Aylesbury were inherited in turn by Baldwin's father, William, by Baldwin's elder brother, Richard (d.1484), and in 1484 by Baldwin himself.

The Collins' Peerage error where 'John" was transcribed as 'William' in the abridgment of the Last Will and Testament of William Dormer was perpetuated when reprinted in Testamenta Vetusta: Being Illustrations from Wills, of Manners, Customs, &c. As Well As of the Descents and Possessions of Many Distinguished Families. Volume 2 By Nicholas Harris Nicholas, Esq., In the will of William Dormer, proved on 7 October 1506, his living family members are described for the purposes of bequests, to wit:

- William Dormer's daughter Joan Alburgh to receive 10 marks. (This style indicates his daughter Joan Dormer was married to ___ Alburgh, who was likely deceased.)
- Lettice ("Letyce") Dormer was named, without bequest due to transcription error (an almost illegible single word).
- William Dormer's wife Agnes to receive one-third of his lands for life, with remainder to his heir, their son Richard Dormer. (A footnote by the compiler mentions that his wife Agnes was the daughter of Sir John Launcelyn, a French knight.)
- William Dormer's daughter Margery, wife of Thomas Deane, to receive 10 marks.
- William Dormer's daughter Agnes, wife of William Baldwin, to receive 10 marks. (Corrected transcription: William Dormer's daughter Agnes, wife of John Baldwin, to receive 10 marks.)
- Robert his son and heir was named.

William Dormer's unabridged original will is still available for viewing.

== Career ==
Details of John Baldwin's early legal career are sparse. He joined the Inner Temple at some time before 1500, and was practicing in the Court of Requests by 1506. He was appointed a justice of the peace for Buckinghamshire in 1510. He gave his first reading at the Inner Temple in 1516, and served as treasurer from 1521 to 1523.

In 1529 Baldwin was returned to Parliament for Hindon, and in 1530 was appointed Attorney General for Wales and the Duchy of Lancaster.

He gave a third reading at the Inner Temple in 1531, and was appointed a Serjeant-at-law and King's Serjeant in the same year. In 1534 he was knighted, which Sir John Spelman considered 'unprecedented' for a serjeant.

Further details of Baldwin's judicial career can be gleaned from the reports of Sir James Dyer, whose opinion of Baldwin was not always complimentary. In June 1535 Baldwin was required to pass sentence of treason on the Carthusian priors, as the remaining justices had departed before the verdict was rendered. Then, in later life Baldwin added to his landed estates. In 1536 he purchased a country home at Little Marlow, and in 1540 the site of the former Greyfriars monastery in Aylesbury. In 1538 Baldwin was involved, through no fault of his own, in a miscarriage of justice at the assizes at Bury, when a man was convicted of murder on the evidence of his young son, and after his execution it was discovered that the alleged victim was still alive.

Baldwin was a circuit judge in Norfolk until 1541, and then served on the home circuit. After the death of Sir Robert Norwich, he was appointed Chief Justice of the Common Pleas on 19 April 1535, and served in that capacity until his death.

He died 24 October 1545, and was buried in Aylesbury Church.

== Marriages and issue ==
According to Baker, although the identity of Baldwin's first wife is 'uncertain', her first name was probably Agnes, and she was the mother of Baldwin's son, William, and three daughters, Agnes, Pernell and Alice: However, as noted above, according to other sources, Baldwin's first wife was Agnes Dormer, the daughter of William Dormer (d.1506) of West Wycombe, and the sister of Sir Robert Dormer (d. 1552).

- William Baldwin (d.1538), was a lawyer of the Inner Temple. He married Mary Tyringham, the daughter of Thomas Tyringham (d. 28 September 1526) of Tyringham, Buckinghamshire, by Anne Catesby, daughter of Sir Humphrey Catesby of Whiston, Northamptonshire, but predeceased his father, leaving no issue.
- Agnes Baldwin married Robert Pakington (d.1536). Their son, Sir Thomas Pakington (died 2 June 1571), was one of Baldwin's heirs.
- Pernell Baldwin married firstly Thomas Ramsey of Hitcham, Buckinghamshire, by whom she had a daughter, Elizabeth Ramsey, and secondly Edward Borlase (d.1544), Citizen and Mercer of London. Their eldest son, John Borlase (c.1528 – 6 May 1593), esquire, was one of Baldwin's heirs, and was bequeathed all Baldwin's law books. He married Anne Lytton, the daughter of Sir Robert Lytton (d.1550) of Knebworth. After the death of his first wife, Pernell Baldwin, Edward Borlase married Joan Dormer, the daughter of Sir Michael Dormer.
- Alice Baldwin was the last abbess of Burnham Abbey. She survived her father by only a few months, and in her will made provision for the erection of a marble tomb with depictions of her parents and their children.

In 1518 Baldwin married Anne (née Norris), widow of William Wroughton (d. before 1515), and daughter of Sir William Norris (d.1507) of Yattendon, Berkshire, by his third wife, Anne Horne. She is said to have become insane before Baldwin's death, and in October 1545 Edward Seymour, Earl of Hertford, suggested that she be placed in the care of her son by her first marriage, Sir William Wroughton (d. 4 September 1559). Three months later Anne was sent to live with her kinswoman, Mary (née Norris) Carew (d.1570), widow of Vice-Admiral Sir George Carew (c.1504 – 19 July 1545), and daughter of Henry Norris (b. before 1500, d. 1536) of Bray, Berkshire, and his wife, Mary. The date of Anne's death is not known.

== Notes ==
Parliament of England
Preceded by Unknown	Member of Parliament for Hindon; 1529	Succeeded by Unknown
Legal offices
Preceded by Sir Robert Norwich	Chief Justice of the Common Pleas; 1535–1545	Succeeded by Sir Edward Montagu
