= Denis Tyndall =

English Anglican priest (1890–1965)

Reverend Canon Edward Denis Tyndall MC (1890 – 9 December 1965) was an Anglican priest in the 20th century.

Educated at Pembroke College, Oxford and ordained in 1915, Tyndall was a curate at the Church of the Ascension, Stirchley. He served as a chaplain to the British Armed Forces during the First World War and was awarded the Military Cross in the 1918 New Year Honours.

He held incumbencies at St Jude's Church, Birmingham and then St James' Whitehaven before his appointment as Provost of St Ninian's Cathedral, Perth.

During his incumbency of St Jude's Birmingham, he and his curate, Michael Parker, compiled Adoremus: A Book of Eucharistic Worship for the Young. The book was described as "primarily for use at what is known as the Children's Eucharist" but was also "to meet the need of the increasing number of parishes in which there is the 'Parish Eucharist'".

He died on 9 December 1965.

Anglican Communion titles
Preceded by Lumsden Barkway	Provost of St Ninian’s Cathedral, Perth; 1944 – 1955	Succeeded by Wilfred Currie
