= St Anne's Church, Duddeston =

St Anne’s Church, Duddeston
- St Anne’s Church, Duddeston
- 52°29′26.2″N 1°52′9.2″W
- OS grid reference: SP 08878 88126
- Location: Birmingham
- Country: England
- Denomination: Church of England

History
- Dedication: St Anne
- Consecrated: 1869

Architecture
- Groundbreaking: 25 June 1868
- Completed: 1869
- Construction cost: £2,600
- Closed: 1951

Specifications
- Capacity: 770 persons
- Length: 90.5 feet (27.6 m)
- Width: 44.5 feet (13.6 m)

St Anne's Church, Duddeston is a former Church of England parish church in Ashted, Birmingham.

== History ==
The foundation stone was laid on 25 June 1868. The church was erected by William J Briley of Birmingham and was consecrated in 1869.

A parish was assigned of St Matthew's Church, Duddeston and Nechells in 1896.

The church was destroyed during the Birmingham Blitz. When the church officially closed in 1951, the parish was merged back into that of St Matthew's Church, Duddeston and Nechells.

== Incumbents ==
- T.G. Watton until 1873 (then vicar of St Jude's Church, Birmingham)
- T.J. Haworth 1873-1897
- Frederick McKenzie 1897-1912
- Ralph J Bryant 1912 - 1923 (afterwards vicar of Holy Trinity Church, Birchfield)
- W. Grome-Merrilees 1923-1926
- Robert Home McCall 1926-1931 (formerly rector of St Andrew's Church, Thorne Coffin)
- W.J. Bastow 1931-1937
- F.S.W. Simpson 1937-1943 (formerly vicar of St Mary and St Hardulph's Church, Breedon-on-the-Hill)

== Organ ==
An organ by Whittaker of Ashton-under-Lyne was installed at a cost of £200 and opened on 17 March 1872 by a recital from Stephen Samuel Stratton, organist of St Bartholomew's Church, Edgbaston. Later it was replaced by an instrument from Sheffields Organ Builders. A specification of the organ can be found on the National Pipe Organ Register. When St Anne's closed, the organ was moved to St Boniface's Church, Quinton.
