= Arthur Stansfield Dixon =

English architect and metal worker (1856–1929)

Arthur Stansfeld Dixon
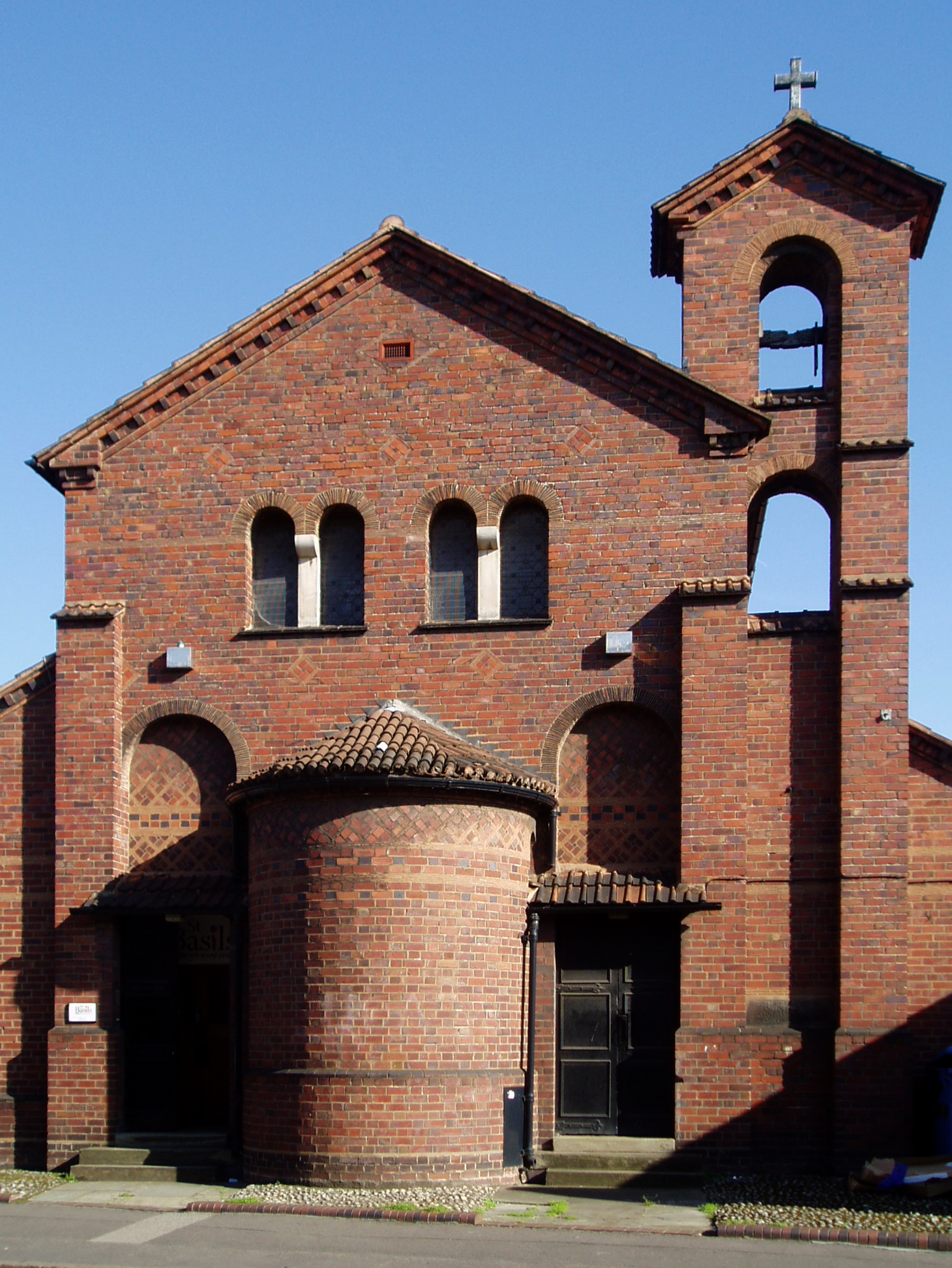
- Church of St John & St Basil, Deritend
- Born: 26 August 1856; Edgbaston, Birmingham
- Died: 8 January 1929 (aged 72)
- Occupations: Architect; Metal Worker
- Relatives: George Dixon (father)

Arthur Stansfeld Dixon (26 August 1856 – 8 January 1929) was an English metal worker and architect.

Born in Edgbaston, Birmingham, he was the eldest son of education reformer and MP George Dixon. He founded the Birmingham Guild of Handicraft and designed their headquarters in Great Charles Street. The building is still extant, but converted to offices.

He also designed the Romanesque style, brick-built Church of St John & St Basil (1910–1911) in Heath Mill Lane in Birmingham's Digbeth district (52.4769°N 1.8813°W). It was described by Nicholas Pevsner as "the finest example of his Arts and Crafts primitivism". A further church design was St Andrew's Church, Barnt Green, Worcestershire (52.3604°N 1.9880°W).

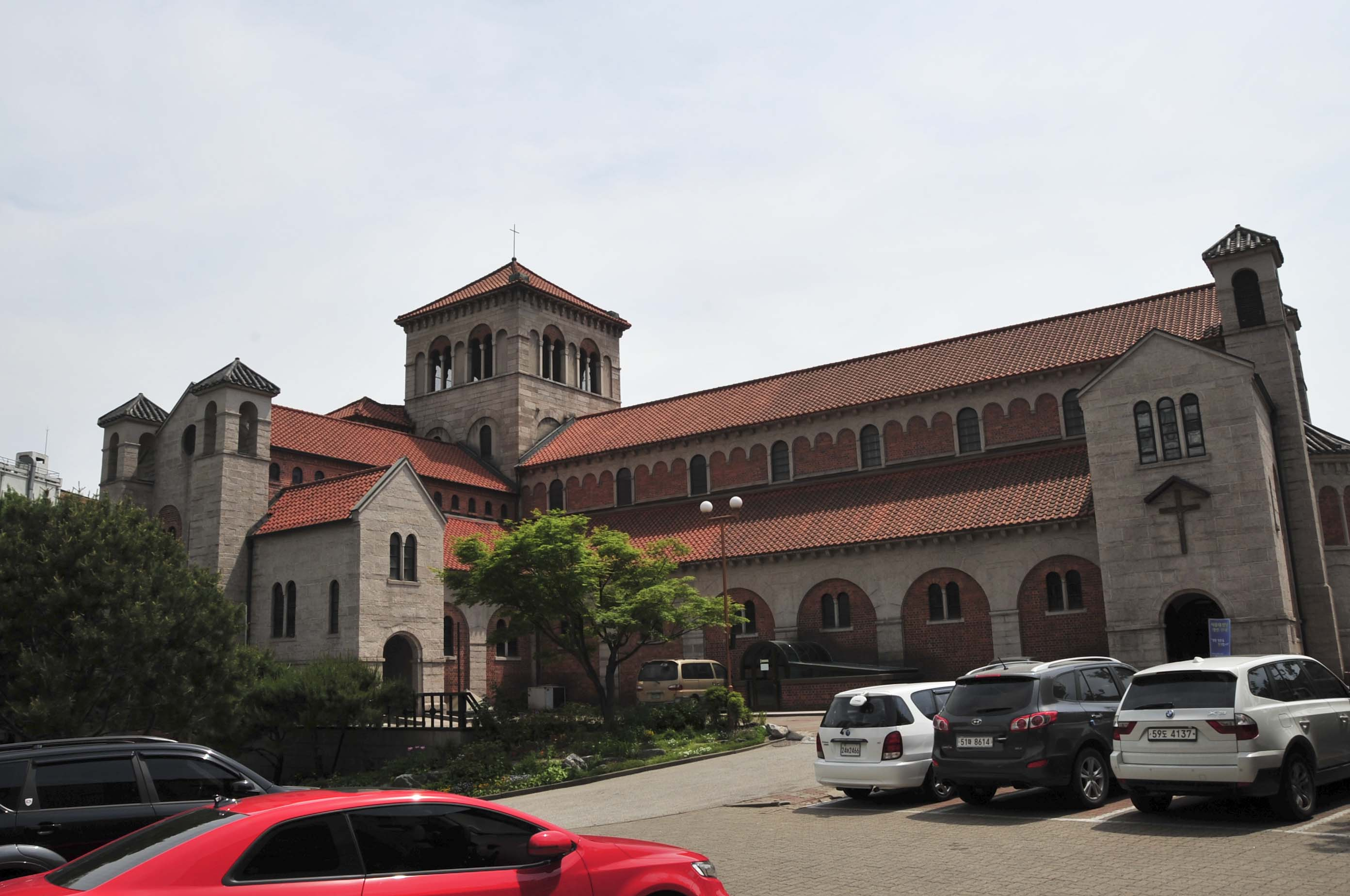
Anglican Cathedral in Seoul

In 1917, he was commissioned to design Seoul Anglican Cathedral in Korea; construction began in 1922 but was only completed in 1996 after the original plans were rediscovered.

In 1923, along with Holland W. Hobbiss he helped to design the rebuild of St Giles Church, Rowley Regis, after it was burned downed. It is the 4th building on that site.

His son James, serving in the Royal Warwickshire Regiment during World War I, was killed aged 22.

Pevsner described Dixon as "an Anglo-Catholic Socialist who associated Gothic with establishment conservatism and dreary Anglican piety".
