= Alice Baldwin (abbess) =

- Died: 1546; Aylesbury, Buckinghamshire
- Parent(s): Sir John Baldwin, Agnes Dormer

Alice Baldwin (died 1546) was the last Abbess of Burnham Abbey near Burnham, Buckinghamshire. She was the daughter of Sir John Baldwin, Chief Justice of the Common Pleas.

== Family ==
Alice Baldwin was the daughter of Sir John Baldwin (d.1545), Chief Justice of the Common Pleas, by his first wife Agnes Dormer, the daughter of William Dormer (d.1506) and sister of Sir Robert Dormer (d.1552).

She had a brother and two sisters, all of whom predeceased her:

- William Baldwin (d.1538), a lawyer of the Inner Temple, who married Mary Tyringham, the daughter of Thomas Tyringham (d. 28 September 1526) of Tyringham, Buckinghamshire, by Anne Catesby, daughter of Sir Humphrey Catesby of Whiston, Northamptonshire, but predeceased his father, leaving no issue.
- Pernell Baldwin, who married firstly Thomas Ramsey, by whom she had a daughter, Elizabeth Ramsey, and secondly Edward Borlase (d.1544), Citizen and Mercer of London, by whom she had four sons, including John Borlase (c.1528 – 6 May 1593), High Sheriff of Buckinghamshire, who married Anne Lytton, the daughter of Sir Robert Lytton (d.1550) of Knebworth.
- Agnes Baldwin, who married Robert Pakington (d.1536), by whom she had two sons, including Sir Thomas Pakington (d. 2 June 1571), who married Dorothy Kitson (d.1577), and three daughters.

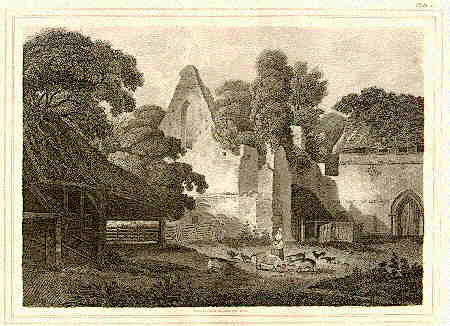
Ruins of Burnham Abbey depicted in The English Traveller, 1819

== Career ==
Alice Baldwin was elected the last Abbess of Burnham Abbey in Buckinghamshire in 1536. The Abbey had been founded in 1265 by Earl Richard of Cornwall, styled King of the Romans, the brother of King Henry III, who endowed it with several manors, including the manors of Burnham and Cippenham. The Abbey, of which only some old walls and a fishpond remained in the mid-1800s, was situated about a half-mile from Burnham.

At the dissolution of the monasteries in the reign of Henry VIII, Burnham Abbey's revenues were valued at £51 2s 4-1/2d. The document of surrender, dated 19 September 1539, was signed by Alice Baldwin, as Abbess, and the nine remaining nuns who were still living there at the time. In return, it is said, for her readiness to surrender the Abbey to the Crown, Alice Baldwin was granted a small pension. After the surrender she appears to have spent her remaining years at Aylesbury at the home of her father, Sir John Baldwin, who both by deed and in his will left her well provided for with a life estate in his lands.

Sir John Baldwin died on 24 October 1545, and Alice survived him by only a few months; her will was proved on 2 March 1546. After Alice's death Sir John Baldwin's heirs at law, Sir Thomas Pakington and John Borlase (c.1528 – 6 May 1593) inherited the Baldwin estates. Sir John Baldwin had been buried in Aylesbury Church, and in her will Alice requested that her executor erect a tomb of marble over his grave with figures depicting her father and mother and their children. It appears that Alice's executor, Richard Cupper (d.1584), carried out this request, although no trace of the monument now remains in Aylesbury Church.

In 1518 Sir John Baldwin had married for a second time, and Alice Baldwin was survived by her stepmother, Anne (née Norris), widow of William Wroughton (d. before 1515), and daughter of Sir William Norris (d.1507) of Yattendon, Berkshire, by his third wife, Anne Horne. Anne had become insane before Baldwin's death, and shortly afterwards was placed in the care of her kinswoman, Mary (née Norris) Carew (d.1570), widow of Vice-Admiral Sir George Carew (c.1504 – 19 July 1545), and daughter of Henry Norris (b. before 1500, d. 1536) of Bray, Berkshire, and his wife, Mary. The date of Anne's death is not known.

In 1544 a grant of the site of the abbey surrendered by Alice Baldwin was made to William Tyldesley, a Groom of the Chamber, and in 1574 Queen Elizabeth I granted a lease of the property to Paul Wentworth, who had married Tyldesley's widow, Helen. In 1569, during Wentworth's tenure, Thomas Howard, 4th Duke of Norfolk, was detained there before being sent to the Tower of London. After passing through various hands, the former Abbey was sold in 1916 to a contemplative religious order, and four centuries after its surrender again became the home of a community of nuns.
