= St Andrew's Church, Bordesley =

St Andrew's
- St Andrew's
- 52°28′37″N 1°52′13.2″W
- OS grid reference: SP 08805 86606
- Location: Bordesley, Birmingham
- Country: England
- Denomination: Church of England

History
- Dedication: St Andrew
- Consecrated: 30 September 1846

Architecture
- Architect: Richard Cromwell Carpenter
- Groundbreaking: 1844
- Completed: 1846
- Construction cost: £3,500
- Demolished: 1985

Specifications
- Length: 124 feet (38 m)
- Width: 47.5 feet (14.5 m)

St Andrew's Church, Bordesley was a parish church in the Church of England in Birmingham.

== History ==
The foundation stone was laid on 23 July 1844 by Henry Pepys, the Bishop of Worcester. The church was built to designs of the architect Richard Cromwell Carpenter with funds from the Birmingham Church Building Society. It was consecrated by Pepys on 30 September 1846.

Its decorated gothic style and layout was admired by contemporary ecclesiologists for the correctness of its plan. It was the last church constructed by the Birmingham Church Building Society.

Out of this parish St Oswald's Church, Small Heath was formed.

A storm in 1894 damaged the spire. The vicar was in dispute with the churchwardens, and the repairs were not completed until after the vicar, Robert Foster Burrow, left in 1900. The spire was restored in 1901.

The church was demolished in 1985, having given its name to the adjacent St Andrew's Road and St Andrew's Street, and to the nearby St Andrew's football ground, home of Birmingham City F.C.

== Organ ==
The church contained an organ dating from 1849 by Banfield, later modified by Albert Keates. A specification of the organ can be found on the National Pipe Organ Register.
