= St John the Evangelist's Church, Perry Barr =

St John the Evangelist’s Church
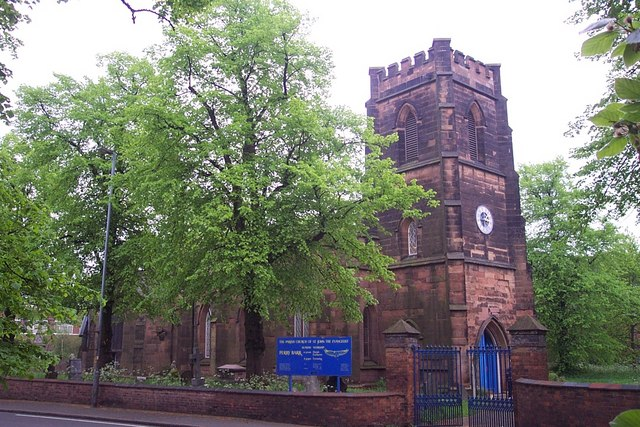
- St John's in 2006
- St John the Evangelist’s Church
- 52°31′33″N 1°54′4.33″W
- OS grid reference: SP 06847 92034
- Location: Perry Barr
- Address: Church Road, Birmingham B42 2LB
- Country: England
- Denomination: Church of England
- Website: sjpb.org.uk

History
- Dedication: St John the Evangelist
- Consecrated: 6 August 1833

Architecture
- Heritage designation: Grade II listed
- Architect: Robert Studholme
- Groundbreaking: 1831
- Completed: 1833

Specifications
- Length: 80 feet (24 m)
- Width: 26 feet (7.9 m)

Administration
- Diocese: Birmingham
- Archdeaconry: Birmingham
- Deanery: Handsworth & Central
- Parish: Perry Barr

Clergy
- Vicar: Revd Daniel Payne

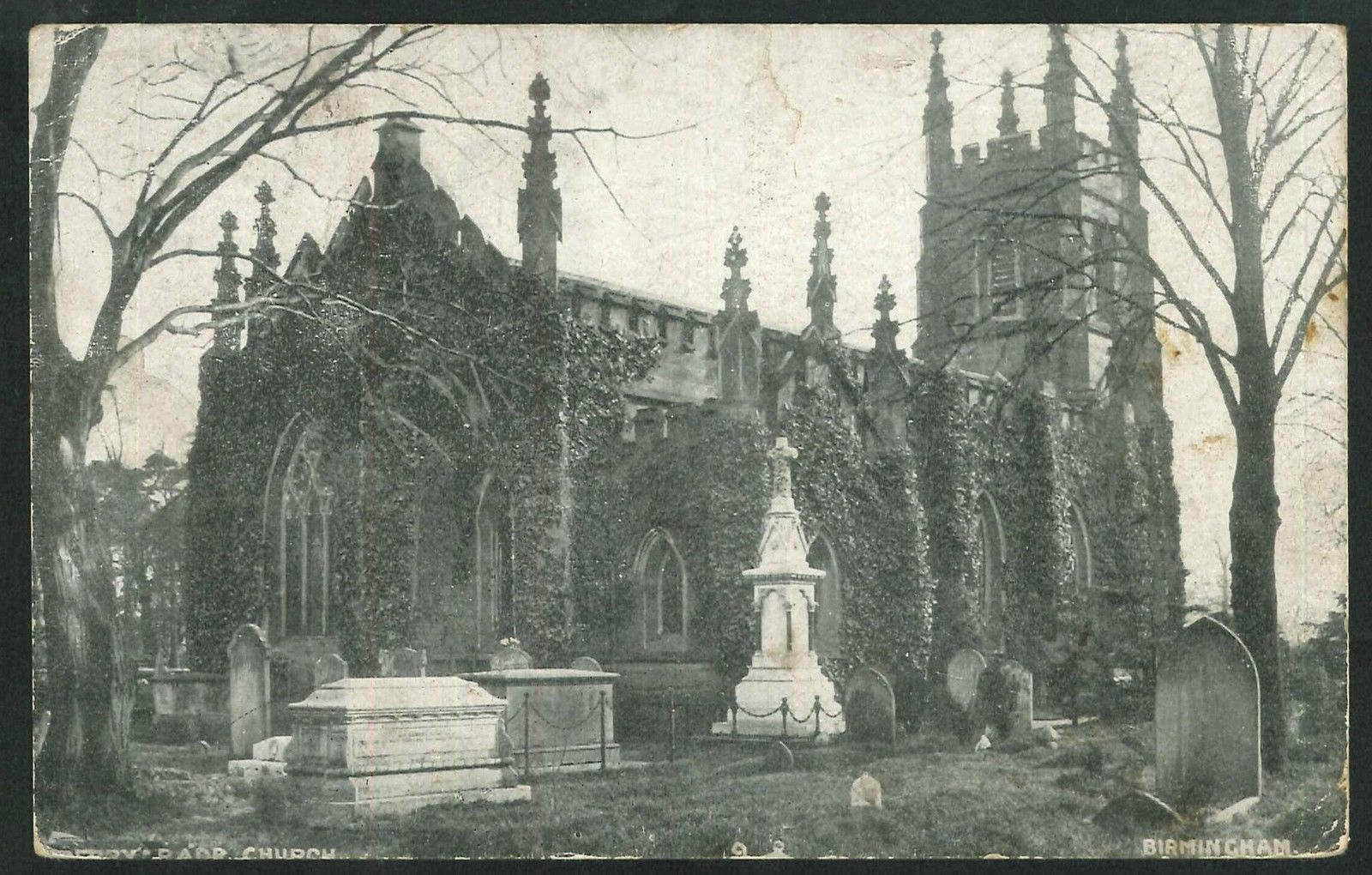
The church, before 1905

St John the Evangelist's Church, Perry Barr is a Grade II listed parish church in the Church of England in the Perry Barr area of Birmingham, England.

== History ==
The building was designed by the stonemason Robert Studholme, from Sutton Coldfield, with a single aisle nave, side vestries, and a bell tower. Work started in 1831.

The church was consecrated on 6 August 1833 by Rt Revd Henry Ryder, Bishop of Lichfield and Coventry.

The church was enlarged in 1888 with the construction of the chancel, organ chamber and vestries by J.A. Chatwin at a cost of £1,600. The builder was Collins of Tewkesbury.

In the 1880s, two transepts were added.

There are windows by Hardman & Co. (Epiphany; south transept), Pearce & Cutler (Jesus teaching; north transept; 1938), and Camm (John the Baptist; alcove behind the organ). The tower's clock is from 1838.

In 1894, part of the parish was taken to form a new parish for St Paul's Church, Hamstead.

The church functions in the liberal Catholic tradition within the Church of England.

== Bells ==
The current bells, dating from 1776, were installed in 1972, having originally hung in St. John's, Deritend, which was demolished after German bombing during World War II. They were recast by Taylor's of Loughborough and installed in Bishop Latimer Memorial Church, Handsworth in 1960, but the tower there proved unsuitable.

== Organ ==
The church has a two manual pipe organ. A specification of the organ can be found on the National Pipe Organ Register.
