= St Paul's Church, Bordesley Green =

St Paul’s Church, Bordesley Green
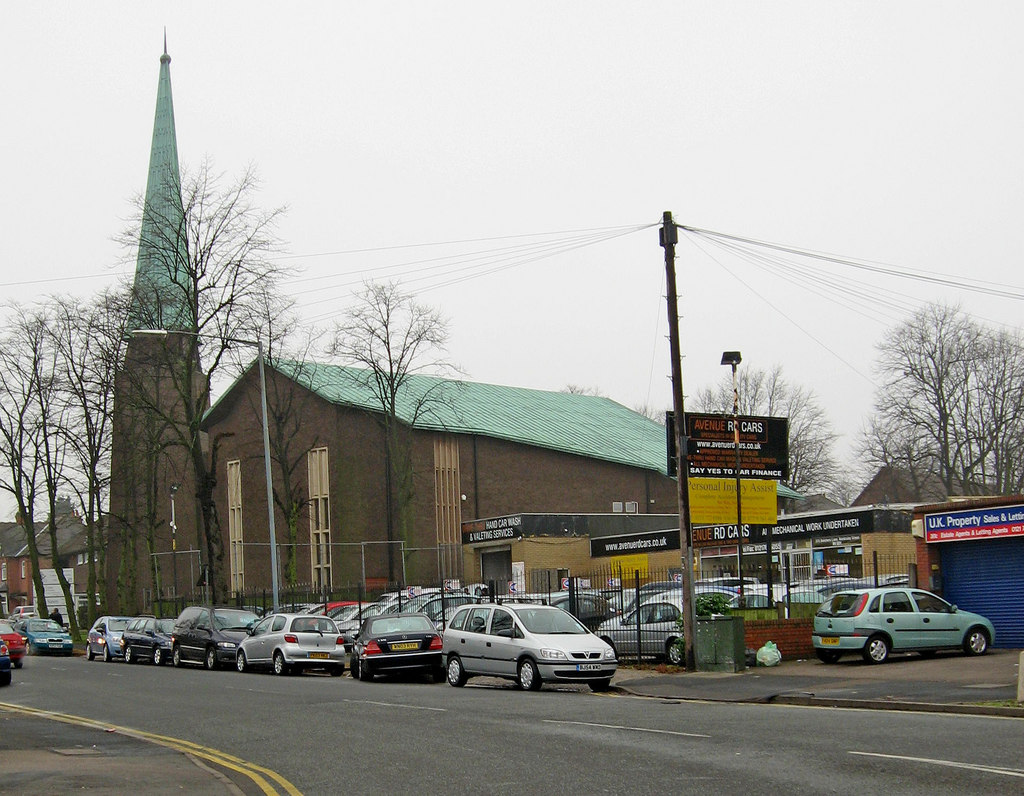
- St Paul’s Church, Bordesley Green
- St Paul’s Church, Bordesley Green
- 52°28′48.96″N 1°49′57.68″W
- Location: Bordesley Green
- Country: England
- Denomination: Church of England
- Churchmanship: Evangelical

History
- Status: Standing
- Dedication: St Paul

Architecture
- Heritage designation: Grade A listed
- Architect: John P Osborne
- Completed: 1969

Specifications
- Capacity: 269 persons

Administration
- Diocese: Anglican Diocese of Birmingham
- Archdeaconry: Aston
- Deanery: Yardley and Bordesley
- Parish: St Paul, Bordesley Green

St Paul's Church, Bordesley Green is a Grade A locally listed parish church in the Church of England in Birmingham.

== History ==
The church was founded as a mission church from St Margaret's Church, Ward End in 1911 for the Ideal Village which was being constructed in Bordesley Green. A red brick building was constructed in 1913, and was consecrated in 1929.

In 1969, a long-awaited large church was built at the same site to the designs of the architect John P Osborne. In 1999, this was beautifully reordered to form a multi-purpose building which is used both for worship and as a Conference Centre with meeting rooms and offices. The present building offers a stimulating environment under a low pitch copper felt roof. The trapezoidal plan tapers symmetrically from West to East. Stained glass windows by Margaret Trehearne were installed. The chapel sheds beautiful light through the red and blue stained glass.

The mission church was reordered in 1993 and now houses a purpose designed and Ofsted Outstanding Day Nursery, serving the local community. The associated Crossover Charity operating from 619 Bordesley Green provides a Resource Centre serving the community and contributing to well-being through support for unemployed people and many others projects.

== Organ ==
The organ was removed prior to reorganisation in 1999. One of the musicians who played the organ in his youth is Roger Jones, leader of CMM – Christian Music Ministries.
