= St Bartholomew's Church, Allen's Cross =

St Bartholomew's Church
- St Bartholomew's Church
- 52°24′42.4″N 1°59′4.6″W
- OS grid reference: SP 01046 79350
- Location: Allen's Cross, Northfield, Birmingham
- Country: England
- Denomination: Church of England
- Churchmanship: Modern Catholic
- Website: A Church Near You page

History
- Dedication: St Bartholomew
- Consecrated: 7 May 1938

Architecture
- Architect: S. N. Cooke
- Style: Romanesque
- Completed: 1938
- Closed: 1998
- Demolished: 2006

Specifications
- Length: 124 feet (38 m)
- Width: 47.5 feet (14.5 m)

Administration
- Diocese: Diocese of Birmingham
- Archdeaconry: Archdeaconry of Birmingham
- Deanery: King's Norton
- Parish: Allen's Cross

St Bartholomew's Church, Allen's Cross is a parish church in the Church of England in Birmingham.

== History ==
The foundation stone for the new church was laid on 21 April 1937 by Councillor R. Canning J.P. It took its dedication from St Bartholomew’s Church, Birmingham which was closed in 1937 because of its failing structure.

It was designed in a Romanesque style to designs by the architect Samuel Nathaniel Cooke and consecrated by the Bishop of Birmingham Ernest Barnes on 7 May 1938.

In 1998 the church suffered an arson, and in 2006 the building was demolished. The parish is worshipping in temporary premises until a replacement church can be constructed.

== Organ ==
The church contained an organ dating from 1888 by Walter James Bird which had originally been installed in St Bartholomew’s Church, Birmingham. It was adapted for installation in this church in 1938. A specification of the organ can be found on the National Pipe Organ Register. The organ was lost in the arson attack of 1998.
