= Humfrey Grose-Hodge =

British writer and headmaster (1891–1962)

Humfrey Grose-Hodge FSA (4 April 1891 – 7 January 1962) was a writer and headmaster of Bedford School.

== Biography ==
Born on 4 April 1891, the son of Revd. Edward Grose-Hodge, Humfrey Grose-Hodge was educated at Marlborough College and at Pembroke College, Cambridge, where he gained a first class degree in Classics, and was President of the Cambridge Union Society in 1913. He joined the Indian Civil Service in 1914, serving as Assistant Magistrate and Collector in Bengal before being commissioned in the British Indian Army in 1916. During the First World War he served on the North West Frontier, in Mesopotamia, Palestine and Syria. He was an Assistant Master at Charterhouse School between 1920 and 1928, and Headmaster of Bedford School between 1928 and 1951.

Humfrey Grose-Hodge was elected as a Fellow of the Society of Antiquaries of London in 1946. He died on 7 January 1962.

== Publications ==
- Four Speeches of Cicero Translated into English, Loeb Classical Library, 1927
- Murder at Larinum: Being the Narrative Portions of Cicero's Speech Pro Cluentio, Cambridge University Press, 1932
- Verses in Sicily: Selections from the Verrine Orations, Cambridge University Press, 1935
- Roman Panorama: A Background for Today, Cambridge University Press, 1944
- A Case of High Treason: Being Cicero's Speech in Defence of Gaius Rabirius, Cambridge University Press, 1956
