= St Thomas' Church, Birmingham =

St Thomas' Church
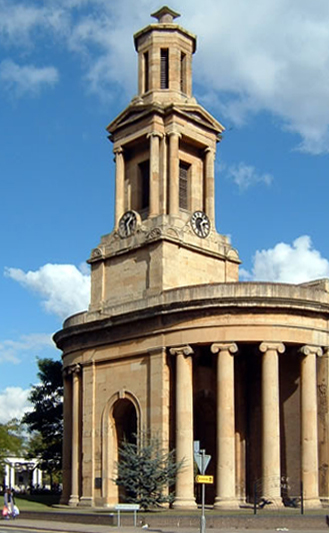
- The surviving tower and portico
- St Thomas' Church
- 52°28′24″N 1°54′54.22″W
- OS grid reference: SP 06466 86142
- Location: Birmingham
- Country: England
- Denomination: Church of England

History
- Dedication: Thomas the Apostle
- Consecrated: 22 October 1829

Architecture
- Architect: Thomas Rickman
- Style: Neoclassical
- Groundbreaking: 22 October 1826
- Completed: 1829
- Demolished: 1940 (partial)

Specifications
- Capacity: 800 people

St Thomas' Church, Bath Row, is a former Church of England parish church in Birmingham.

== History ==
It was built as a Commissioners' church. The foundation stone of the church was laid by Folliott Cornewall, Bishop of Worcester, on 22 October 1826 and the church was built to designs of the architect Thomas Rickman at a cost of £14,220 (equivalent to £1,219,531 in 2025) and consecrated by Cornewall on 29 October 1829. It was for a time the largest church in Birmingham, seating 2,600.

During the Chartist riots of 1839, crowds took railings from around the churchyard to use as pikes.

Part of the parish was taken to form the parish of St Asaph's when this was consecrated in 1868. A St Thomas's football team competed in the 1880-81 Birmingham Senior Cup.

It was restored in 1893 under the supervision of the architect Frank Barlow Osborn when the old high-back pews and pew platforms were removed, the church was cleaned and renovated, and the organ restored by Walter James Bird of Birmingham, all at a cost of £1,200 (equivalent to £133,320 in 2025).

On the night of 11 December 1940, during World War II, all but the tower and classical west portico was destroyed by German bombs. The parish was united with Immanuel Church, which had closed in 1939, and Immanuel Church was reopened.

The remaining portico and tower have been preserved and are now part of St Thomas' Peace Garden.

== Rectors ==
- William Marsh 1829–1842
- Edward Bird 1842–1847 (formerly rector of Tattenhall, Cheshire)
- George S. Bull 1847–1864 (formerly incumbent at St Matthew's Church, Duddeston and Nechells)
- Charles Thomas Wilkinson 1864–1870 (formerly incumbent at Attercliffe, Sheffield, afterwards Vicar of St Andrew's Church, Plymouth)
- Thomas D. Halsted 1870–1888 (formerly Vicar of St Paul's Church, Greenwich, afterwards Vicar of Little Hereford, Tenbury)
- F. S. Webster 1888–1898
- Walter George Whicker 1898–1910
- W. J. Sheppard 1910–1919
- C. T. Aston 1919
- J. Bell 1920–1929 (formerly vicar of St Paul's Leyton and St John's Walthamstow, afterwards Vicar of St Mary's Church, Harrogate)
- Douglas Barton

== Organ ==
A new organ was installed by Bishop of London and opened on 24 November 1837 by George Hollins. It was rebuilt and enlarged in 1861 by Mr Bosward when it was equipped with three manuals (choir manual of 8 or 9 stops prepared for) with 12 stops on the Great, 10 on the Swell and 4 on the pedal (1 prepared for). The organ was renovated again in 1893 when three new stops were added by Walter James Bird of Cregoe Street, Birmingham.

=== Organists ===
- John Chapman 1829 – 1864 (formerly organist of St Martin in the Bull Ring)
- Alfred J. Sutton 1865–1870
- John Pearce 1870–1882 (formerly organist of St Paul's Church, Birmingham)
- Paul Smith 1882–1888
- Alfred Ashdown Box 1888–1928
