= St Alphege Church, Solihull =

Church in the West Midlands, England

Coordinates: 52°24′38″N 01°46′33″W

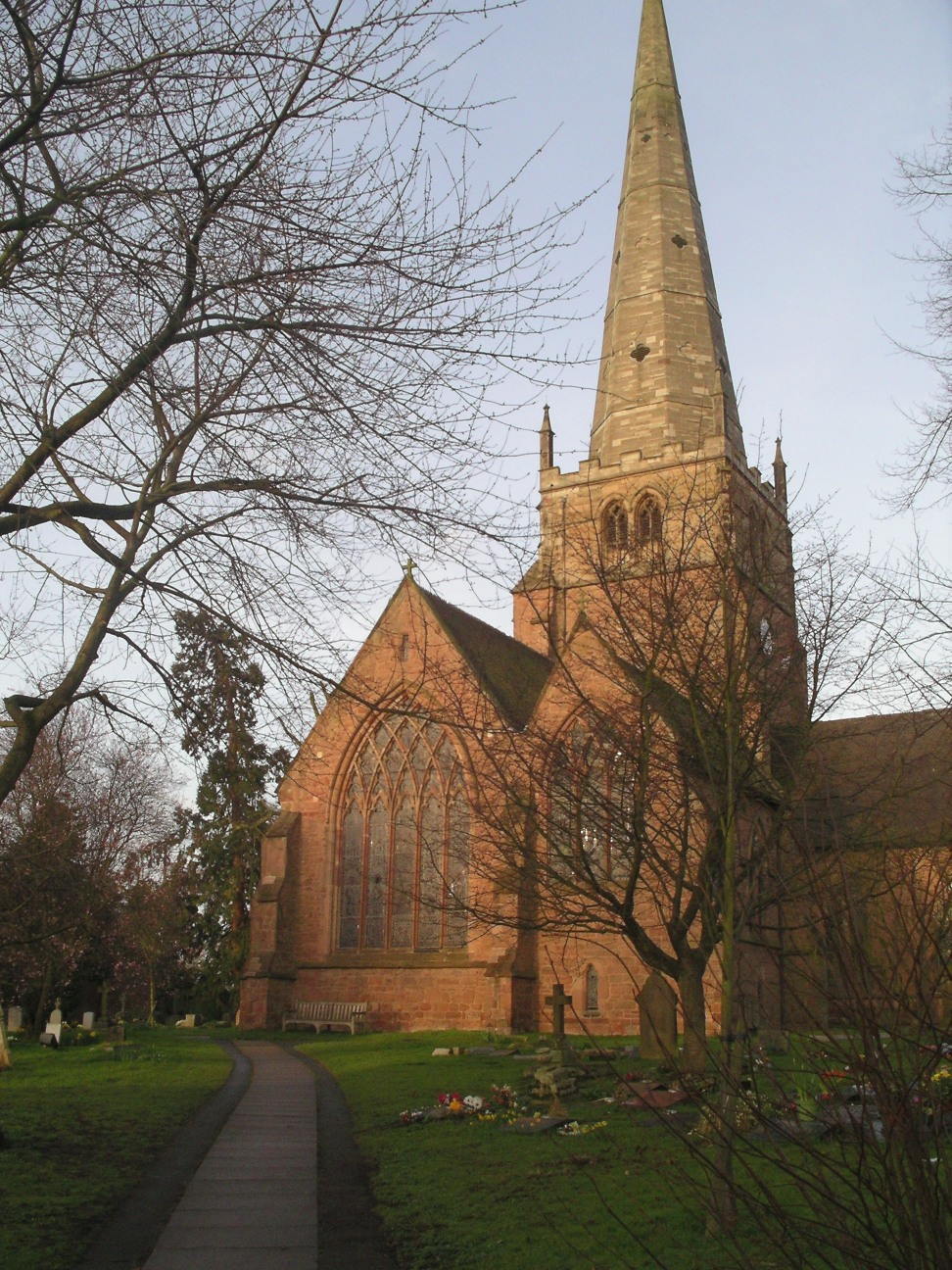
- St Alphege Church, Solihull
- St Alphege Church, Solihull
- Denomination: Church of England
- Churchmanship: Liberal Catholic
- Website: Parish Website

History
- Dedication: St Alphege

Administration
- Province: Canterbury
- Diocese: Birmingham
- Parish: Solihull

Clergy
- Rector: Vacant

St Alphege Church, Solihull, is a medieval parish church in the Church of England in Solihull, West Midlands.

== History ==
The church is medieval, dating from the 13th century. The previous spire was 59m and collapsed in 1757: the current spire is 57.34m (188.13 ft).

"The Church, dedicated to St. Alphege, is a large cruciform structure. The tracery mouldings and corbels in the interior are extremely elegant; there are also some fine specimens of screen work: it consists of nave, chancel, side aisles, and an embattled tower, surmounted by an octagonal spire, and contains a peal of thirteen good bells."

The bells were all recast and rehung in 1932 by John Taylor & Co of Loughborough, and the church registers date from 1538.

The church is part of a team which includes

- St Helen's Church, Solihull
- St Michael's Church, Solihull

In 2012, St Alphege Church celebrated the millennium of the martyrdom of St Alphege in 1012. In 2020, along with churches of other denominations in central Solihull, the Parish celebrated eight hundred years since the foundation of St Alphege Church, and so of Christianity in Solihull.

== Description ==
The church is of cruciform plan with a chancel having a two-storied chapel north of it, a central tower, north and south transepts, a nave with north and south aisles and a north porch. It is the only medieval cruciform church in the Diocese of Birmingham and one of only four in the historic county of Warwickshire. There was originally a late 12th-century church on the site, the only evidence of which is the east end of the south wall of the nave with a blocked window, and the marks of its steeply pitched roof on the west face of the tower. It would have been shorter and slightly narrower than the present nave. The church was enlarged by Sir William de Odingsells with the chancel, and a vaulted chamber and chapel dedicated to St Alphege to the north of it. A north aisle with a chapel of St Thomas Becket was added to the nave and some remains of an arch between the two still exist. This was followed in the 14th century by the addition of the transepts, with the insertion of side-arches in the tower and the enlargement of those in the east and west walls. The rebuilding and widening of the north aisle followed, along with the north porch. A little later in the 14th century the aisle was continued westwards, beyond the original west end. The present aisle was added in 1535, when both arcades were rebuilt and the nave lengthened.

The top section of the tower was constructed in 1470, much later on than the lower part, probably near the date of other 15th-century work, likely undertaken before the nave and aisles were completed. The original stone spire collapsed in 1757 and was rebuilt soon afterwards to a lesser height. The south aisle, owing to a structural weakness in the arcade and the pressure of the nave roof, collapsed in 1751 and was again rebuilt almost immediately afterwards, but the arcade and aisle again failed to resist the thrust of the roof and in 1939 were heavily shored with timber until the work of restoration was undertaken.

There have been several restorations. In 1879 the west window was renewed and other repairs executed, including work to the roofs of the nave and aisles, which were stripped and rebolted. The work was carried out under the supervision of architect Edward Holmes. The chancel roof, which had suffered severely from the ravages of the deathwatch beetle, was reconstructed in 1933. At the apex of the spire is a weather-vane.

In the church itself there are five chapels currently in use. At the far east end of the church, there is a crypt chapel, which was rededicated to the honour of St Francis in 2004, above which is the Upper Chapel dedicated to St Alphege, and it is here that the Blessed Sacrament is reserved. At the Tower crossing, there is a chapel dedicated to St Katherine of Alexandria. on the north side of the nave is the chapel of St Thomas Becket, a successor to St Alphege, and on the south side is the Chapel of St Antony of Egypt.

== Music department ==
St Alphege has an active music department, with choirs for boys, girls, ladies and men who sing services both separately and in various combinations. There are three sung services every Sunday, regular weekday Evensongs, and larger concerts on a monthly basis. In the past choristers from St Alphege have won Chorister of the Year and many go on to Choral Scholarships at cathedrals or 'Oxbridge' colleges. There are weekly recitals on Wednesdays which attract local and international players and frequent outreach projects with local schools.

The church has a pipe organ dating from the seventeenth century. It has had substantial restoration work by Broxell Elliot, Edward James Bossward, Hill and Nicholson. The organ case by Thomas Swarbrick came from St Martin in the Bull Ring Birmingham around 1820. Some refurbishment of the organ took place in 2014 by Nicholson and Co. The work included a new console, and a stepper/sequencer was added.

A specification and pictures of the pipe organ can be found on the National Pipe Organ Register.

=== List of organists ===
- 1773 Mr Joseph Weston
- 1804 Mr Moore
- c. 1820 Miss Jane Fletcher
- 1847 Dr Stephen Hatherley
- 1856 Mr Thomas Anderton
- 1879 Mr Bond
- 1880 Mr De Lancy
- 1886 Dr Courtenay Woods
- 1936 Mr Monk
- 1942 Dr Richard Wassell
- 1949 Mr O'Feeley
- 1951 Mr Colin Frank Cecil Mann
- 1970 Mr Paul Hammond
- 1971 Mr Peter M. Gregory
- 2002 Mr Nigel A. Stark
- 2012 Mr Joe Cooper
- 2021 Mr Christopher Thomas

== Bells ==
The church tower contains a ring of 12 bells. The tenor and 9 others date from 1932, and the treble and second bell from 1968. They were all cast by John Taylor & Co of Loughborough.
