= George Frederick Vincent =

English organist

George Frederick Vincent (25 March 1855 – 30 November 1928) was an English organist and composer.

== Background ==
George Frederick Vincent was born in Houghton-le-Spring on 27 March 1855, son of Charles John Vincent, organist, and educated at the Leipzig Conservatoire. He became organist of Holy Trinity Church, Sunderland, 1872–1874, then Whitburn Parish Church, 1878–1882, then St. Thomas' Church, Sunderland, 1882–1900. In 1900 he was appointed to St Michael, Cornhill.

He was a composer of operettas, cantatas, piano and organ music.

He died in Brentwood, on 30 November 1928.

== Career ==
Cultural offices
| Preceded by Williamson John Reynolds | Organist of St Michael, Cornhill; 1900–1916 | Succeeded by Harold Darke |
