= Immanuel Church, Birmingham =

- Immanuel Church, Birmingham
- 52°28′28″N 1°54′55″W
- OS grid reference: SP 05753 86323
- Location: Birmingham
- Country: England
- Denomination: Church of England

History
- Dedication: Immanuel
- Consecrated: 16 May 1865

Architecture
- Architect: Edward Holmes
- Style: Decorated Gothic
- Completed: 1865
- Construction cost: £4,600
- Closed: 1964
- Demolished: 1964

Specifications
- Capacity: 1,000 people
- Length: 92.5 feet (28.2 m)
- Width: 44 feet (13 m)

Immanuel Church, Birmingham, later known as St Thomas and Immanuel, Birmingham was a Church of England parish church in Birmingham.

== History ==
The church was built on the site of the Magdalen Chapel. It was designed by Edward Holmes and consecrated on 16 May 1865 by the Bishop of Worcester, and a parish assigned out of St Thomas' Church, Bath Row.

In 1939, the church was closed and the parish united with St Thomas' Church, Bath Row. It was re-opened after St Thomas was destroyed in a bombing raid in 1940. The church finally closed and was demolished around 1964. The font was moved to St Mary's Church, Wythall.

== Organ ==
The church had a pipe organ by Bird. A specification of the organ can be found on the National Pipe Organ Register. When the church was closed, the organ was moved to St Faith and St Laurence's Church, Harborne.
