= Williamson John Reynolds =

English organist and composer

Williamson John Reynolds (22 October 1861 – 13 February 1922) was an English organist and composer.

== Education ==
Reynolds was born in Kentish Town, London. He was educated at Compton Place Road New College in Eastbourne, Sussex. He graduated as Mus Bac in 1886 and Mus Doc in 1889.

== Appointments ==
- Organist of Barnet Parish Church
- Organist of St. Michael, Cornhill 1891–1900
- Organist of St Martin in the Bull Ring Birmingham 1900–1920
- Organist of the Church of the Holy Trinity, Stratford-upon-Avon 1920–1922

== Compositions ==
- Magnificat for soli, chorus, strings and organ
- Festival Te Deum, for soli, eight-part chorus and orchestra
- Crossing the Bar
- Allegretto pastorale for organ

Cultural offices
Preceded by Edward Henry Thorne	Organist of St Michael, Cornhill; 1891–1900	Succeeded by George Frederick Vincent
Preceded by Walter Brooks	Organist of St Martin in the Bull Ring; 1900–1920	Succeeded by Richard Wassell
