= John Willink =

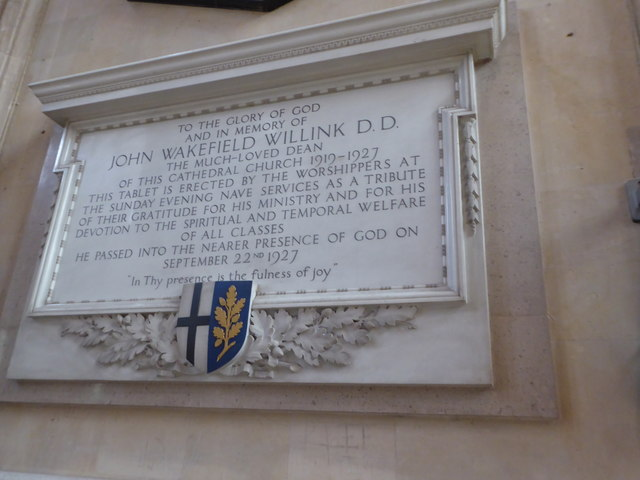
Memorial, Norwich Cathedral

John Wakefield Willink (24 October 1858 – 22 September 1927) was an Anglican dean in the first half of the 20th century.

Willink was educated at Clifton College and Pembroke College, Cambridge. Ordained in 1881, he held a curacy at Bishop Auckland before becoming Vicar of St John's, Sunderland. In 1891 he moved to St Helens and then held further incumbencies at Great Yarmouth and St Martin in the Bull Ring, Birmingham. He became Dean of Norwich in 1919 and held the post until his death on 22 September 1927.

== Notes ==
Church of England titles
Preceded by James Denton Thompson	Rector of St Martin in the Bull Ring; 1912 - 1919	Succeeded by Edward Grose-Hodge
Preceded by Henry Charles Beeching	Dean of Norwich; 1919–1927	Succeeded by Daniel Herbert Somerset Cranage
