= Peter Hall (bishop) =

Bishop of Woolwich

The Rt Revd Peter Hall MA(Cantab)
- Bishop of Woolwich
- Diocese: Diocese of Southwark
- In office: 1984–1996
- Predecessor: Michael Marshall
- Successor: Colin Buchanan
- Other posts: Area bishop of Woolwich (1991–1996); Honorary assistant bishop in Birmingham (1997–present)

Orders
- Ordination: 1955 (deacon); 1956 (priest)
- Consecration: 1984

Personal details
- Born: 2 September 1930
- Died: 27 December 2013 (aged 83)
- Denomination: Anglican
- Parents: William & Bertha
- Spouse: Valerie Page (m. 1957)
- Children: 2 sons
- Education: St John's College, Cambridge

Albert Peter Hall (2 September 1930 – 27 December 2013) was the Bishop of Woolwich from 1984 until 1996 and the first area bishop under the 1991 area scheme.

Hall was educated at Queen Elizabeth's Grammar School, Blackburn, and St John's College, Cambridge. Ordained in 1956 he began his ministry as a curate at St Martin's, Birmingham after which he was the Rector of Avondale, Southern Rhodesia, and then of St Martin in the Bull Ring, Birmingham, before his ordination to the episcopate. A keen mountain walker, he was married with two sons and in retirement continued to serve the church as an assistant bishop in the Diocese of Birmingham.

Religious titles
Preceded by Bryan Green	Rector of St Martin in the Bull Ring; 1969–1984	Succeeded by J.G. Wesson
Preceded by Michael Marshall	Bishop of Woolwich; 1984–1996	Succeeded by Colin Buchanan
