= Guy Rogers =

British Anglican vicar (1876–1967)

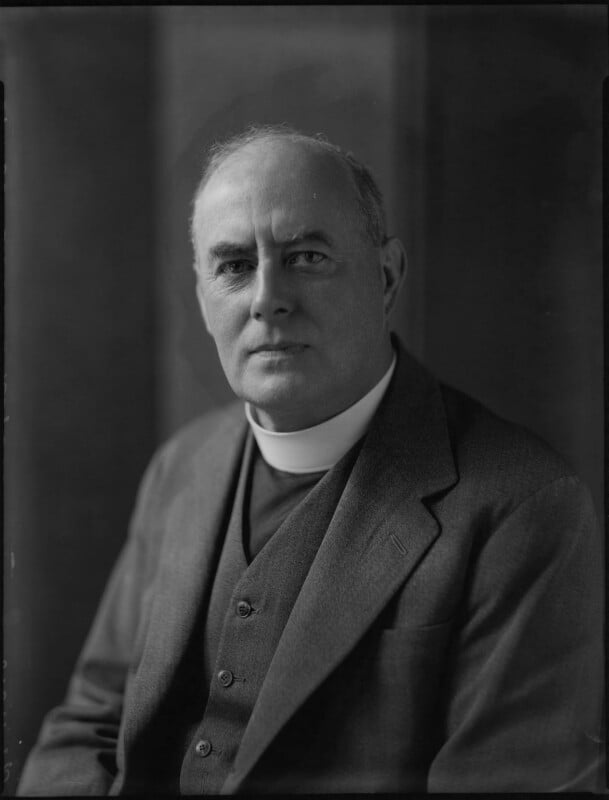
Rogers in 1936

Travers Guy Rogers MC (1876–1967) was an author and priest in the Church of England who became a chaplain to King George V in 1918.

== Career ==
He was educated at Trinity College, Dublin, where he was awarded a BA in 1898 and a BD in 1901. In 1899, he received the Term Composition Prize from the Divinity School.

He was ordained a deacon in 1900 and a priest in 1901.

He was made a temporary chaplain to the forces on 12 October 1915 and served as Chaplain to the 2nd Guards Brigade. He described the harrowing ordeal of preparing a deserter for his execution after his trial in 1916 in letters written home to his family. He was awarded the Military Cross for conspicuous gallantry in 1916. He relinquished this commission on 1 January 1917.

He was appointed a Chaplain to the King in 1918.

He was appointed:

- Vicar of St Matthias's Church, Dublin 1900–1902
- Vicar of Monkstown Church, Dublin 1902–1903
- Vicar of St Barnabas's Church, Kensington 1903–1906
- Vicar of Holy Trinity Church, Marylebone 1906–1909
- Vicar of St John the Evangelist with St Stephen's Church, Reading 1909–1915
- Vicar of All Saints' Church, West Ham 1916–1924
- Rector of St Martin in the Bull Ring, Birmingham, 1924–1948

== Publications ==
- The Inner Life. Essays in Liberal Evangelicalism (1925)
- The Church and the People, Sampson Low, Marston and Co. (1931)
- The return to God: an Anglican View (1933)
- A Rebel at Heart: The Autobiography of a Nonconforming Churchman, Longmans Green and Co. (1956)

Church of England titles
Preceded by Edward Grose-Hodge	Rector of St Martin in the Bull Ring; 1924–1948	Succeeded by Bryan Green
