= Walter Brooks (organist) =

Professor of Music and an organist based in Birmingham

Walter Brooks (1 April 1832 – 14 March 1907) was a professor of music and an organist based in Birmingham.

== Life ==
He was born in Longdon, Worcestershire in 1832, to William Brooks and Elizabeth. He was a chorister and assistant organist in Gloucester Cathedral to John Arnott.

He held the position of organist at St Martin in the Bull Ring, Birmingham for nearly 44 years until in 1900 he was forced to resign on account of ill health. He also lectured at Queen's College, Birmingham (a predecessor college of the University of Birmingham) giving lessons in music and singing. He was also conductor of the Tamworth Musical Society.

He married Anne Simmons, daughter of Thomas Simmons, on 4 August 1858 in St. Mary's Church, Atherstone, and had the following children:

- Arthur C Brooks
- Mary L Brooks
- Clara Brooks
- Bertha Brooks

== Appointments ==
- Organist at Upton St. Leonards
- Organist at Christ Church, Hampstead
- Organist at St. Mary's Church, Atherstone 1854–1857
- Organist at Birmingham Parish Church 1857–1900

Cultural offices
Preceded by James Stimpson	Organist of St Martin in the Bull Ring; 1857–1900	Succeeded by Williamson John Reynolds
