= St Martin in the Bull Ring =

St Martin in the Bull Ring, Birmingham Parish Church
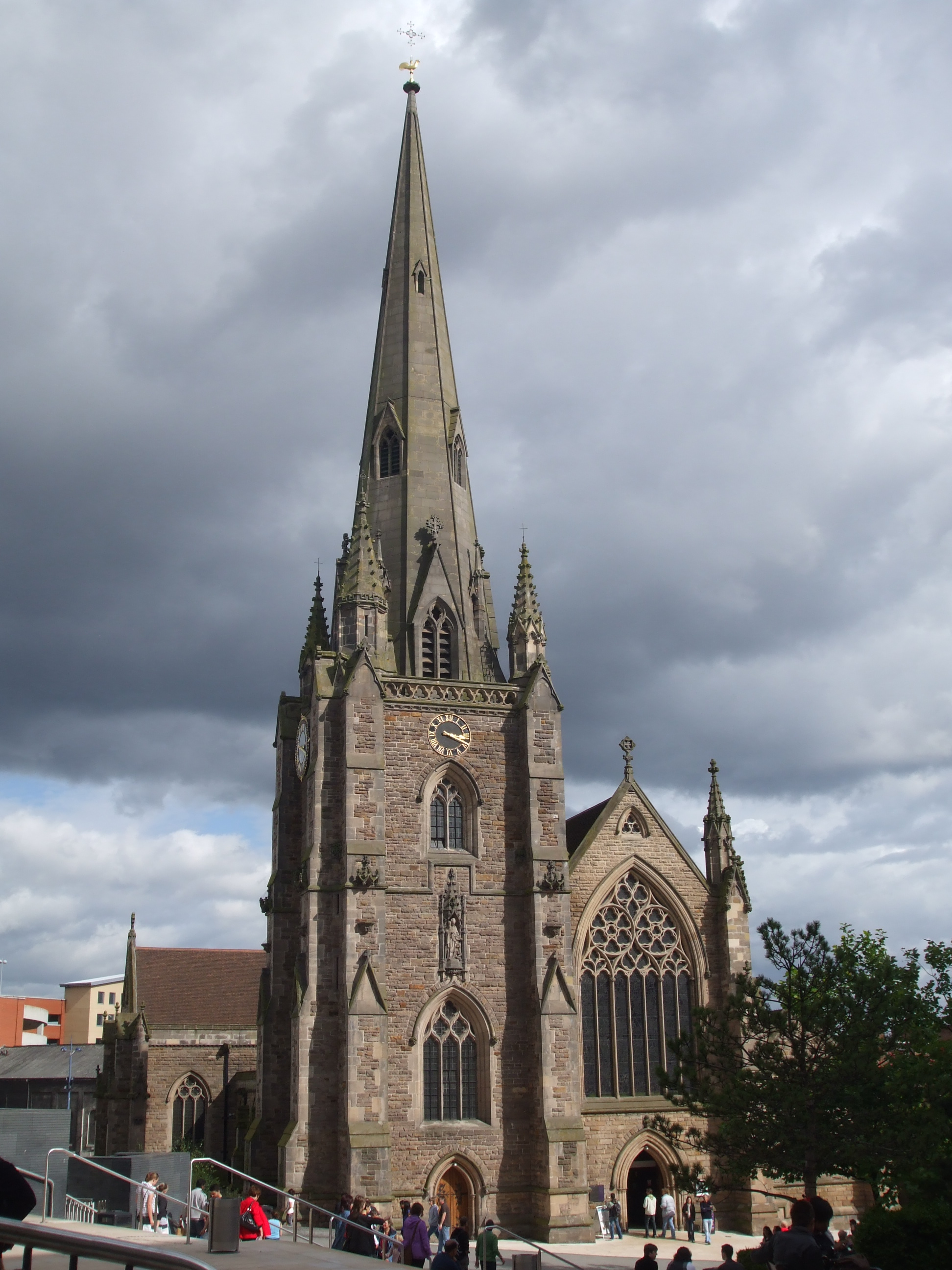
- St Martin in the Bull Ring, Birmingham Parish Church
- 52°28′37.2″N 1°53′35.52″W
- OS grid reference: SP 07352 86566
- Location: Birmingham
- Country: England
- Denomination: Church of England
- Churchmanship: mixed
- Website: bullring.org

History
- Dedication: Saint Martin

Architecture
- Heritage designation: Grade II* listed
- Architect: J. A. Chatwin
- Architectural type: Neo-Gothic

Specifications
- Length: 155 ft (47 m)
- Width: 104 ft (32 m)
- Height: 60 ft (18 m)

Administration
- Province: Canterbury
- Diocese: Birmingham
- Archdeaconry: Birmingham
- Deanery: Central Birmingham
- Parish: St. Martin-in-the-Bull-Ring, Birmingham

Clergy
- Rector: Jeremy Allcock
- Priest: Ivor Lewis
- Building details

Record height
- Tallest in Birmingham from 1855 to 1908^{[I]}
- Preceded by: Church of SS Peter & Paul, Aston
- Surpassed by: Joseph Chamberlain Memorial Clock Tower

General information
- Estimated completion: 1855

St Martin in the Bull Ring is a Church of England parish church in the city of Birmingham, West Midlands, England. It is the original parish church of Birmingham and stands between the Bull Ring Shopping Centre and the markets.

The church is a Grade II* listed building. The current rector is Jeremy Allcock.

== History ==
=== Original church ===
The present Victorian church was built on the site of a 13th-century predecessor, which was documented in 1263. The church was enlarged in medieval times and the resulting structure consisted of a lofty nave and chancel, north and south aisles and a northwest tower with spire.

In 1690, the churchwardens "dressed the church in brick". All was cased in brick with the exception of the spire.

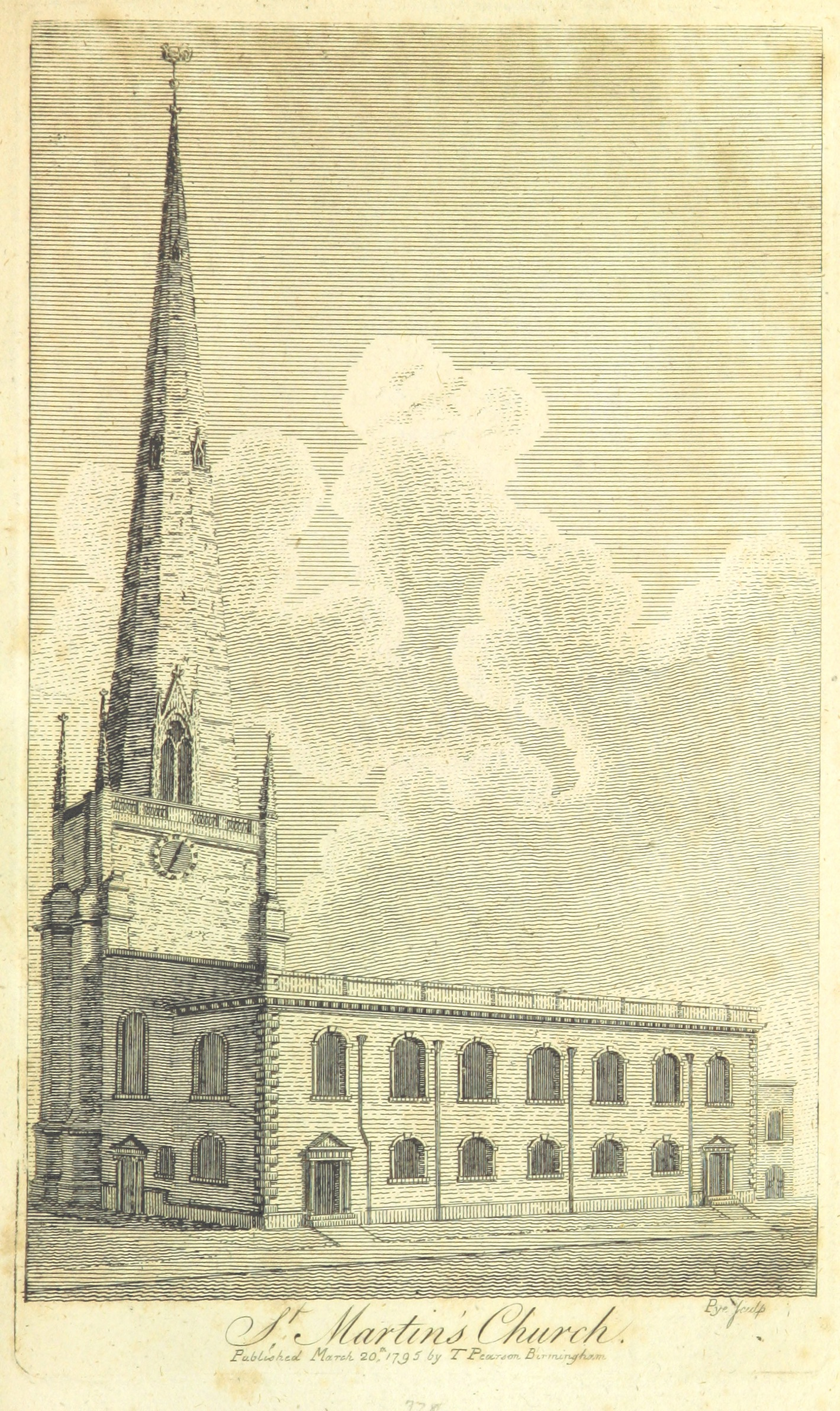
Drawing from William Hutton's 1809 book An History of Birmingham

John Cheshire rebuilt 40 feet (12 metres) of the spire in 1781, which was strengthened by an iron spindle running up its centre for a length of 105 feet (32 metres). It was secured to the sidewalls at every ten feet (three metres) by braces. In 1801, several metres from the top of the spire were replaced after they were found to have decayed. The tops of the four pinnacles surrounding the main spire were also rebuilt. By 1808, the spire had been struck by lightning three times.

In 1853, the brick casing was removed from the tower by Philip Charles Hardwick, who added the open-air pulpit. The church also contained an organ, the reedwork of which had been done by John Snetzler. However, the pipes were found to be ineffective due to their proximity to the church roof and walls.

In 1875, John Thackray Bunce published a book, History of Old St. Martin's, Birmingham, illustrated with paintings by Allen Edward Everitt.

=== Current church ===
In 1873, the church was demolished and rebuilt by architect J. A. Chatwin, preserving the earlier tower and spire. During the demolition, medieval wall paintings and decorations were discovered in the chancel, including one showing the charity of St Martin dividing his cloak with a beggar. Two painted beams were also found behind the plaster ceiling.

The exterior is built of rockfaced Grinshill stone. The interior is of sandstone with an open timber roof, which shows the influence of the great hammerbeam roof of Westminster Hall. The beams are decorated with fine tracery and end in large carvings of angels. The roof weighs 93 long tons (94 tonnes), spans 22 feet (7 metres) over the 100-foot-long (30-metre) nave and is 60 feet (18 metres) high.

The Victorian floor tiles are by Minton and display the quartered arms of the de Bermingham family. The bronze font is by Jacqueline Stieger.

=== Dimensions ===
From east to west the length of the church is 155 ft (47 m), including the chancel, the arch of which rises to 60 ft (18 m); the width, including nave (25 ft or 7.5 m) and north and south aisles, is 67 ft (20 m); at the transepts the width is 104 ft (32 m).

=== Windows ===
The south transept has a Burne-Jones window, made by William Morris in 1875. This window was taken down for safe keeping the day before a World War II bomb dropped beside the church on 10 April 1941, destroying all remaining windows. The west window is a 1954 copy of the Henry Hardman 1875 window destroyed in the Blitz.

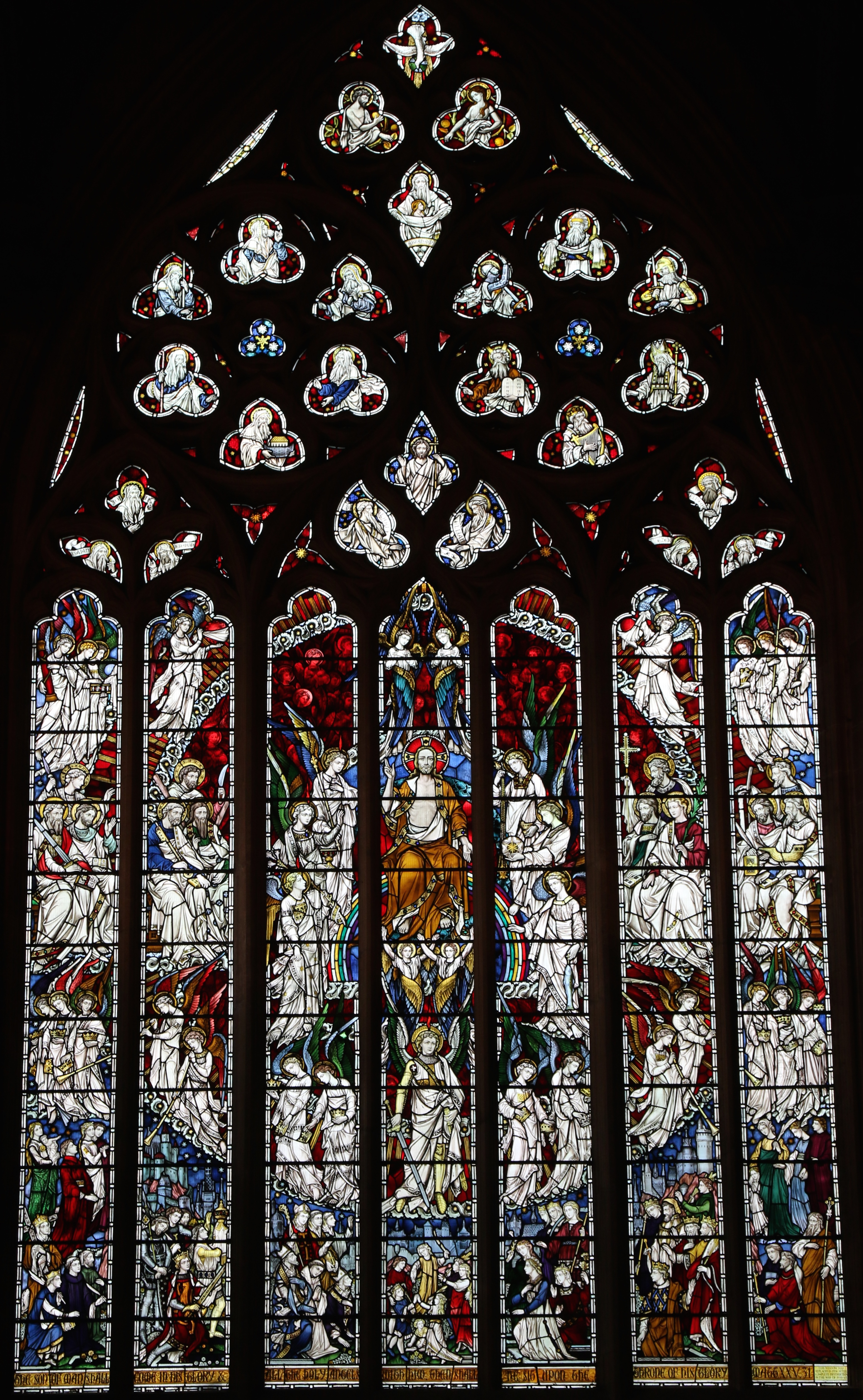
West window by Hardman ca. 1954

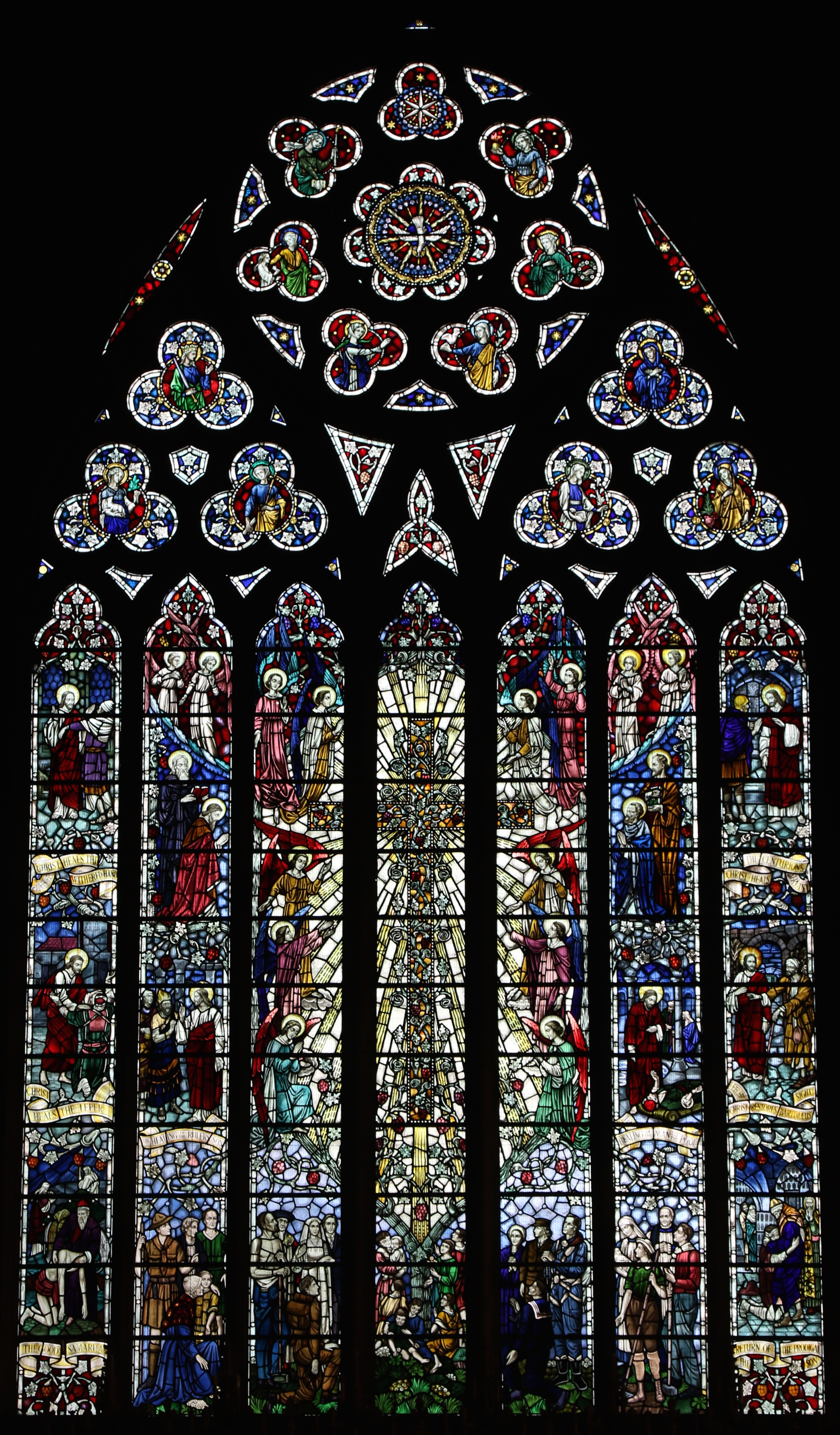
East window by Hardman ca. 1954

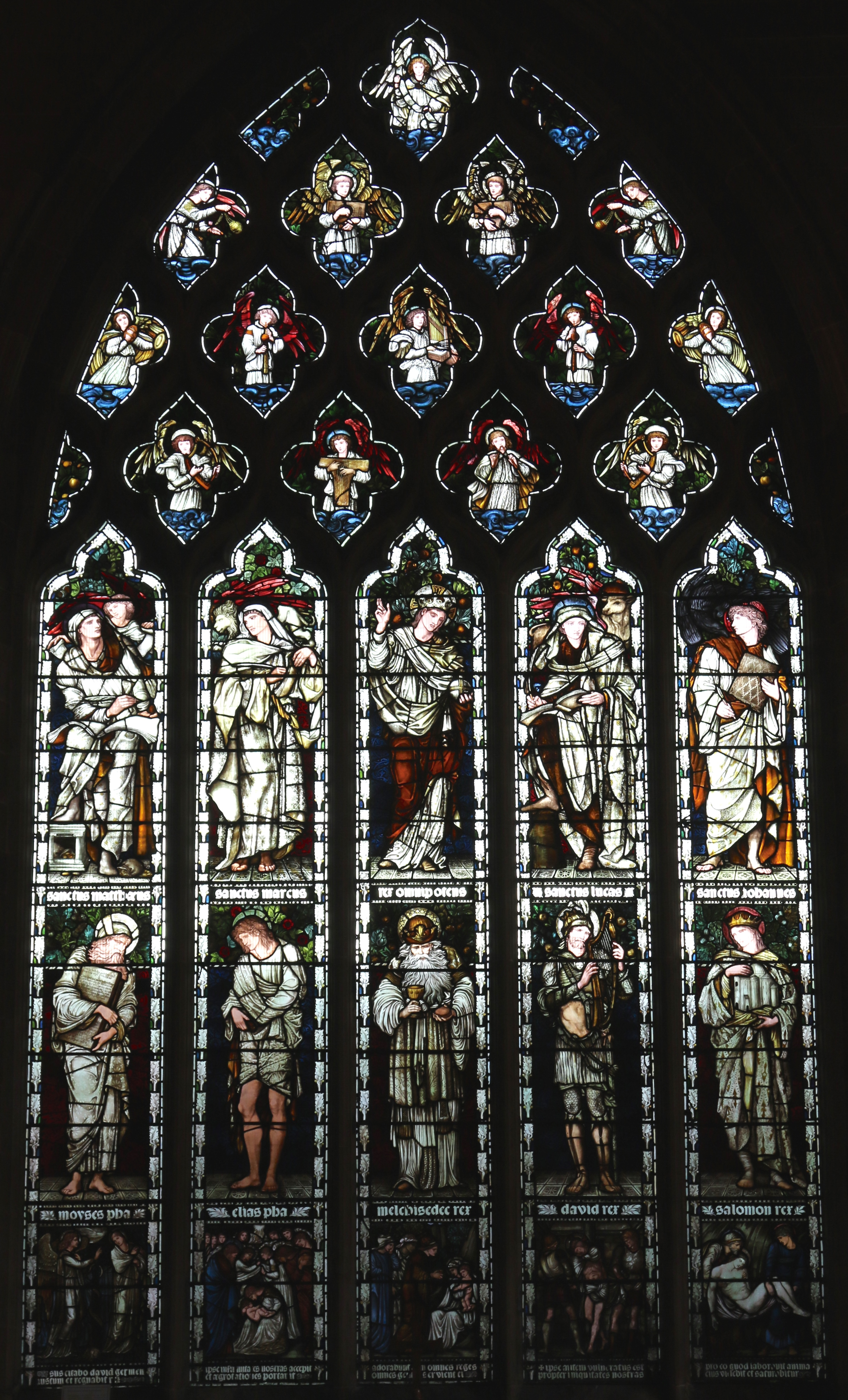
South transept window designed by Burne-Jones, made by Morris & Co.

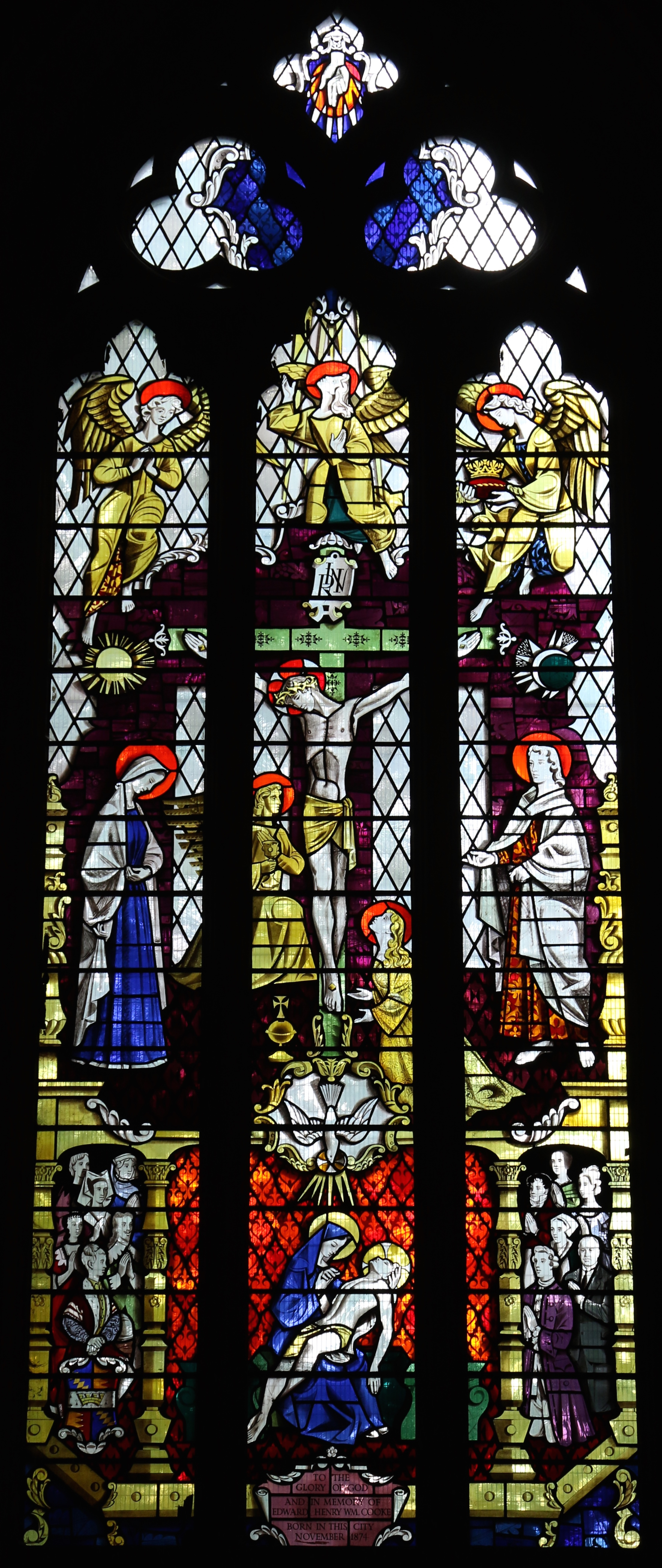
North chapel east window by Harry Harvey, 1956

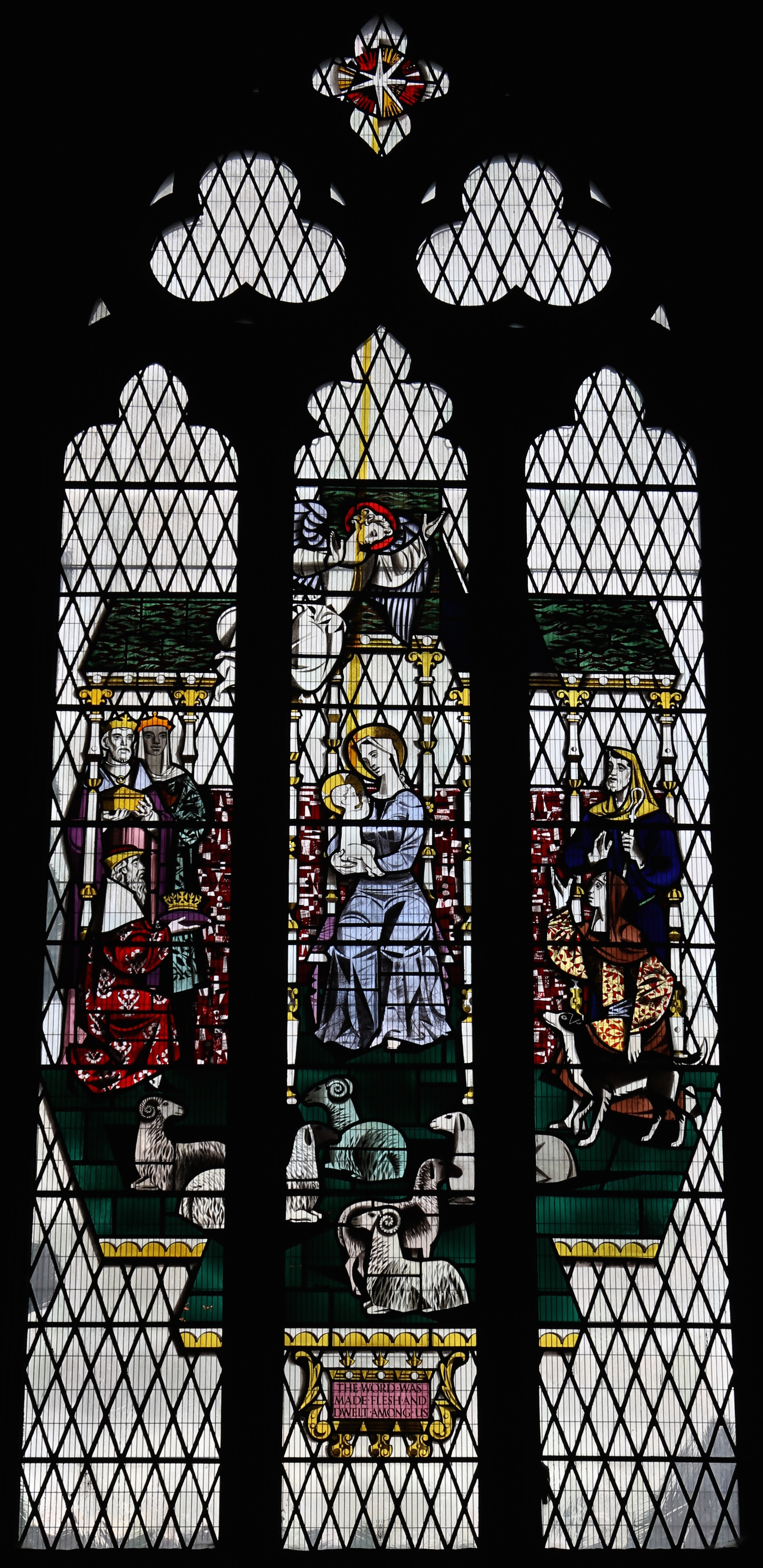
South chapel east window by Harry Harvey, 1958

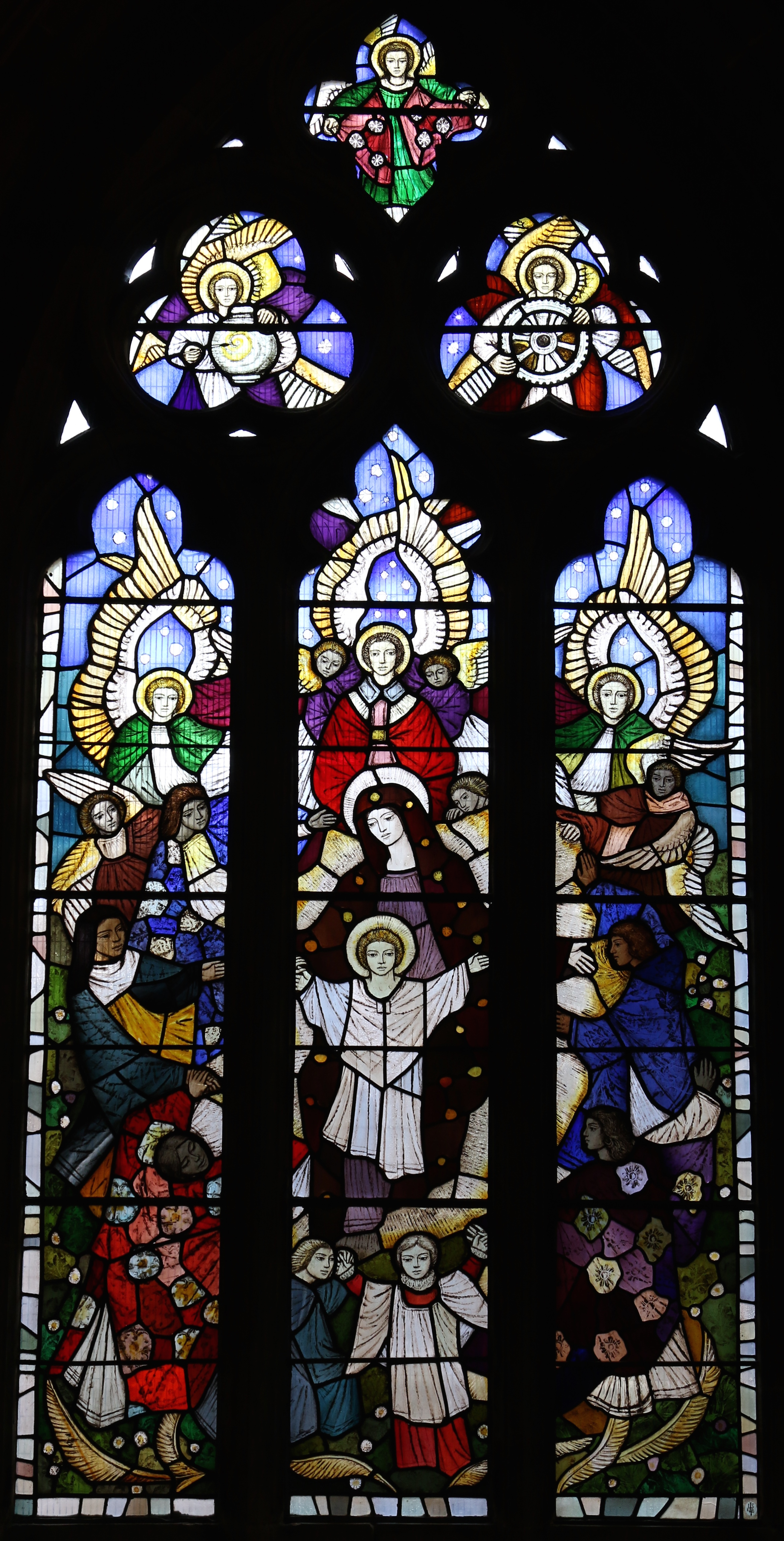
South aisle westernmost window by Lawrence Lee 1980

== Gallery ==
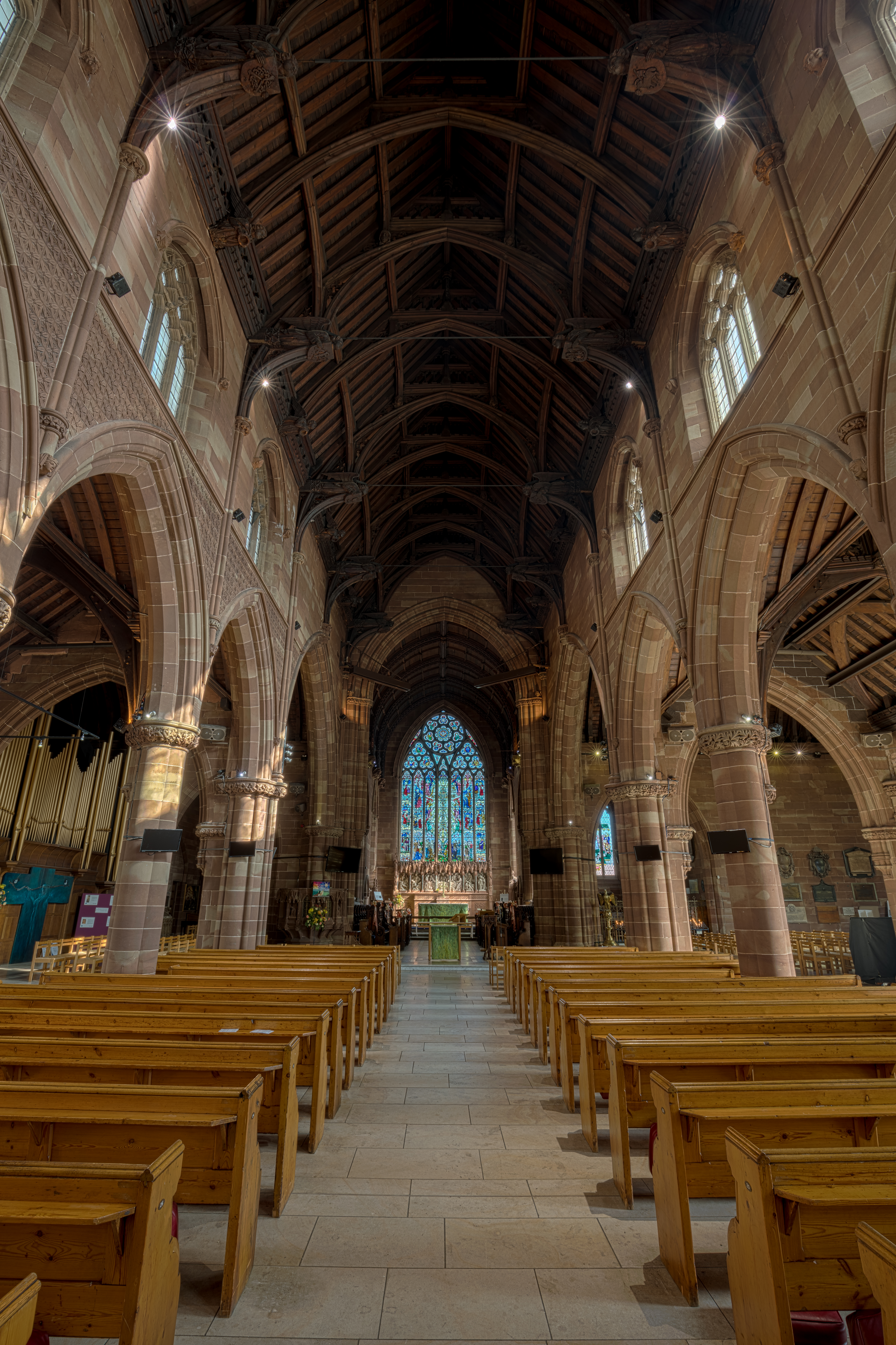
The nave 2016

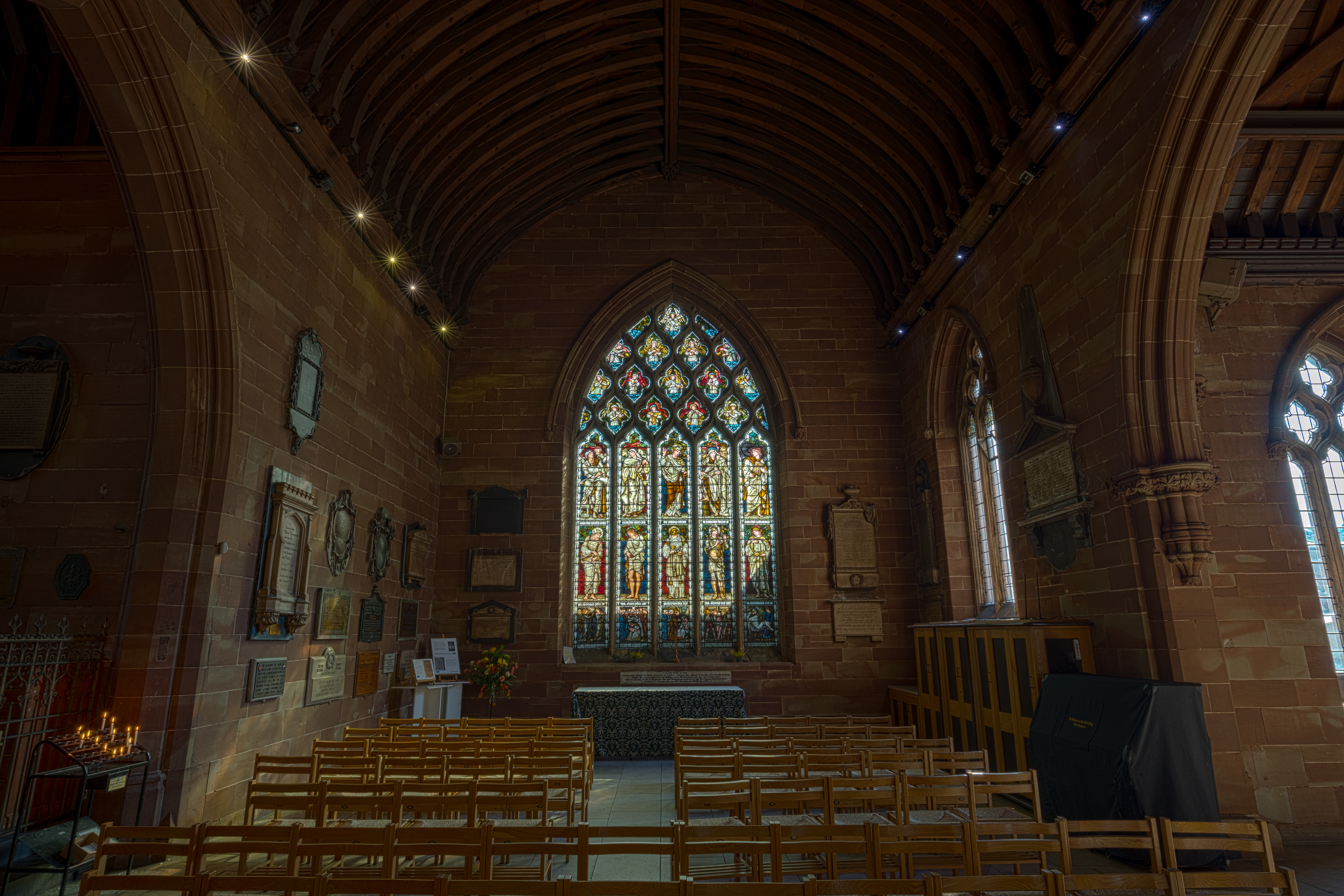
The Burne-Jones window

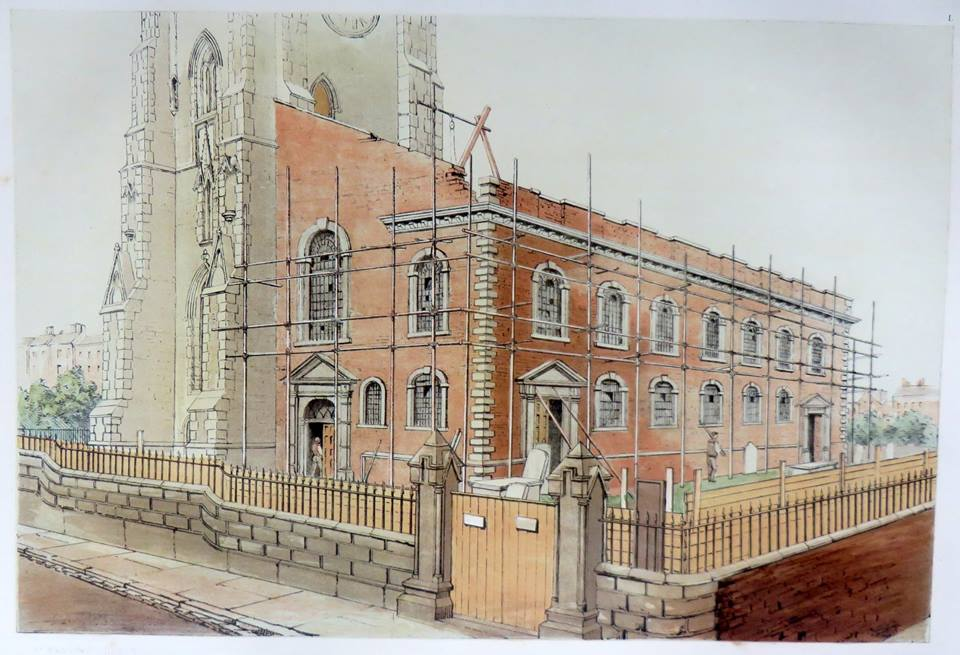
The old, brick-clad, church, immediately prior to demolition, depicted by Allen Edward Everitt in an 1875 book

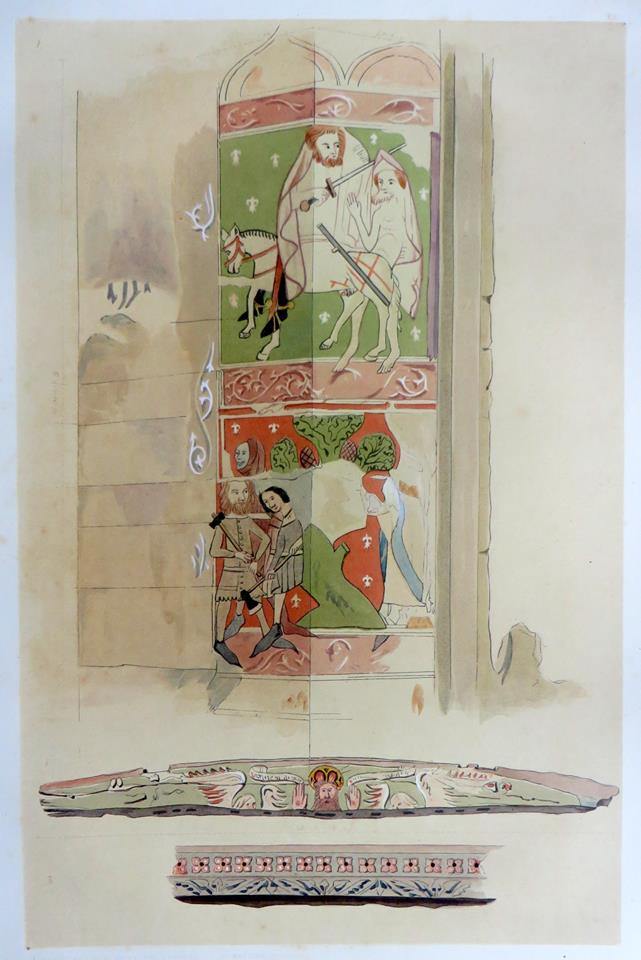
Wall painting, depicted by Everitt

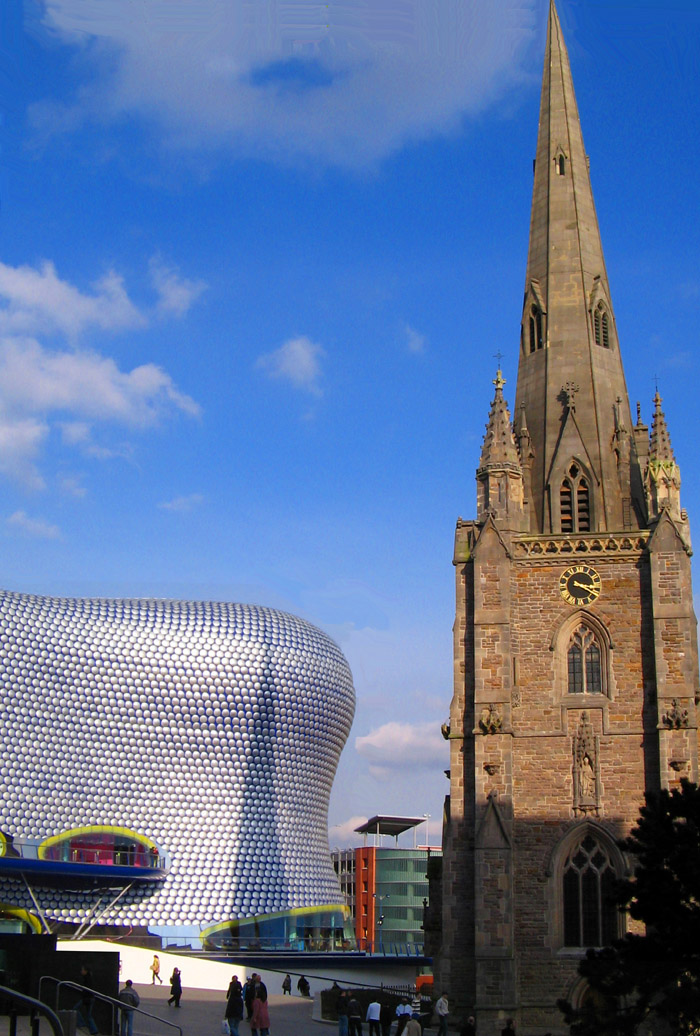
The cleaned church, next to Selfridges

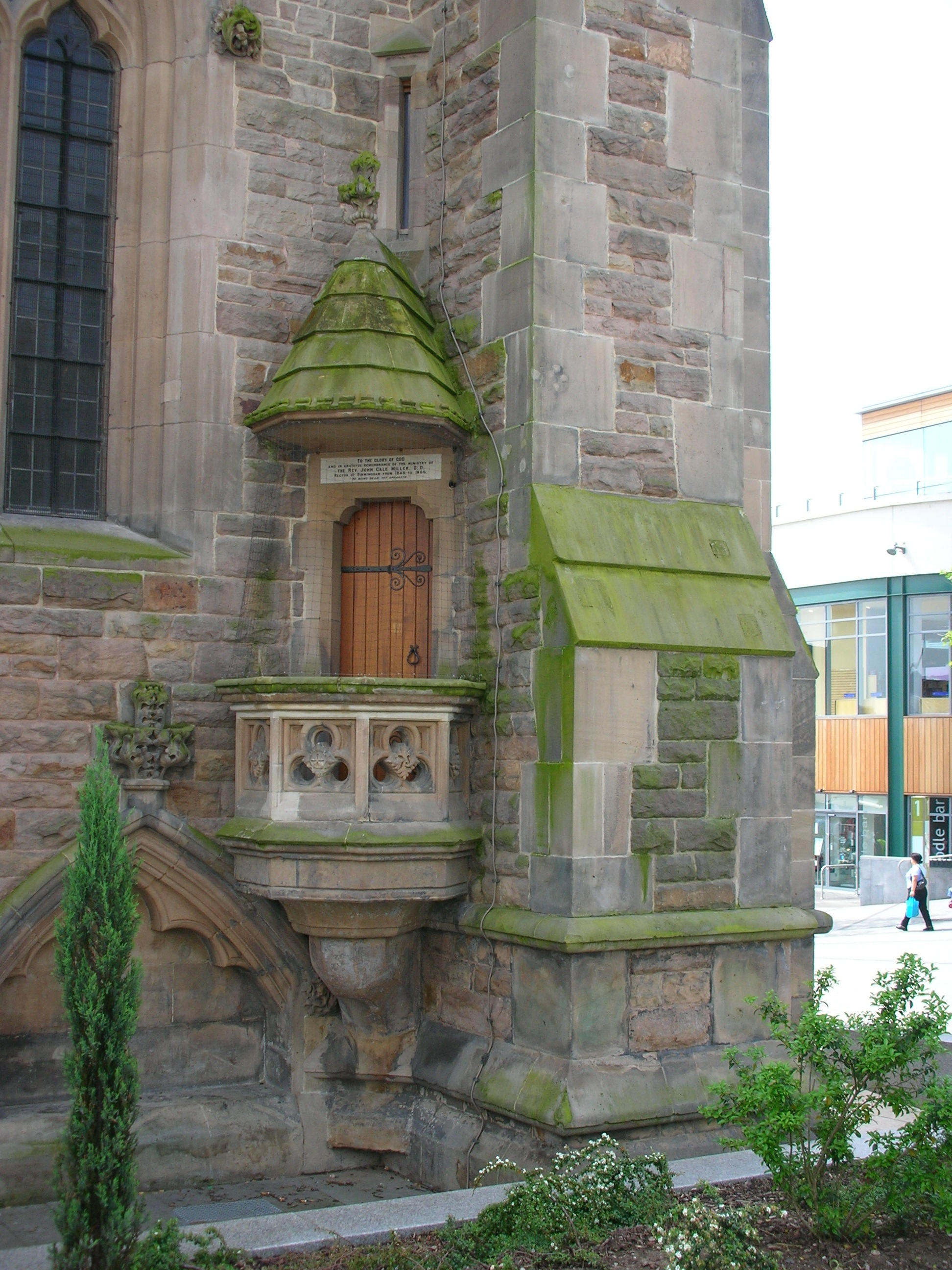
External pulpit

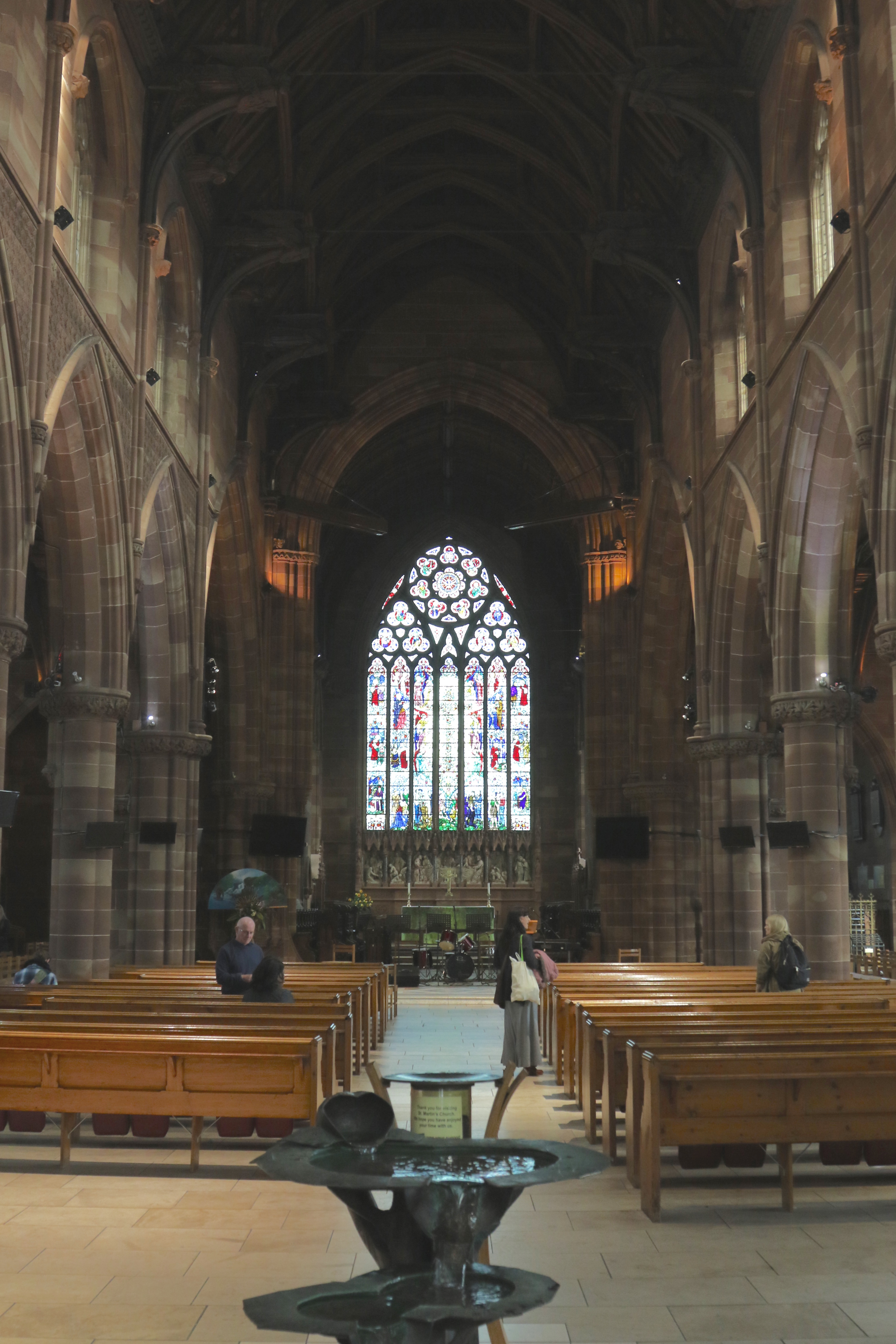
Nave and chancel from the east end

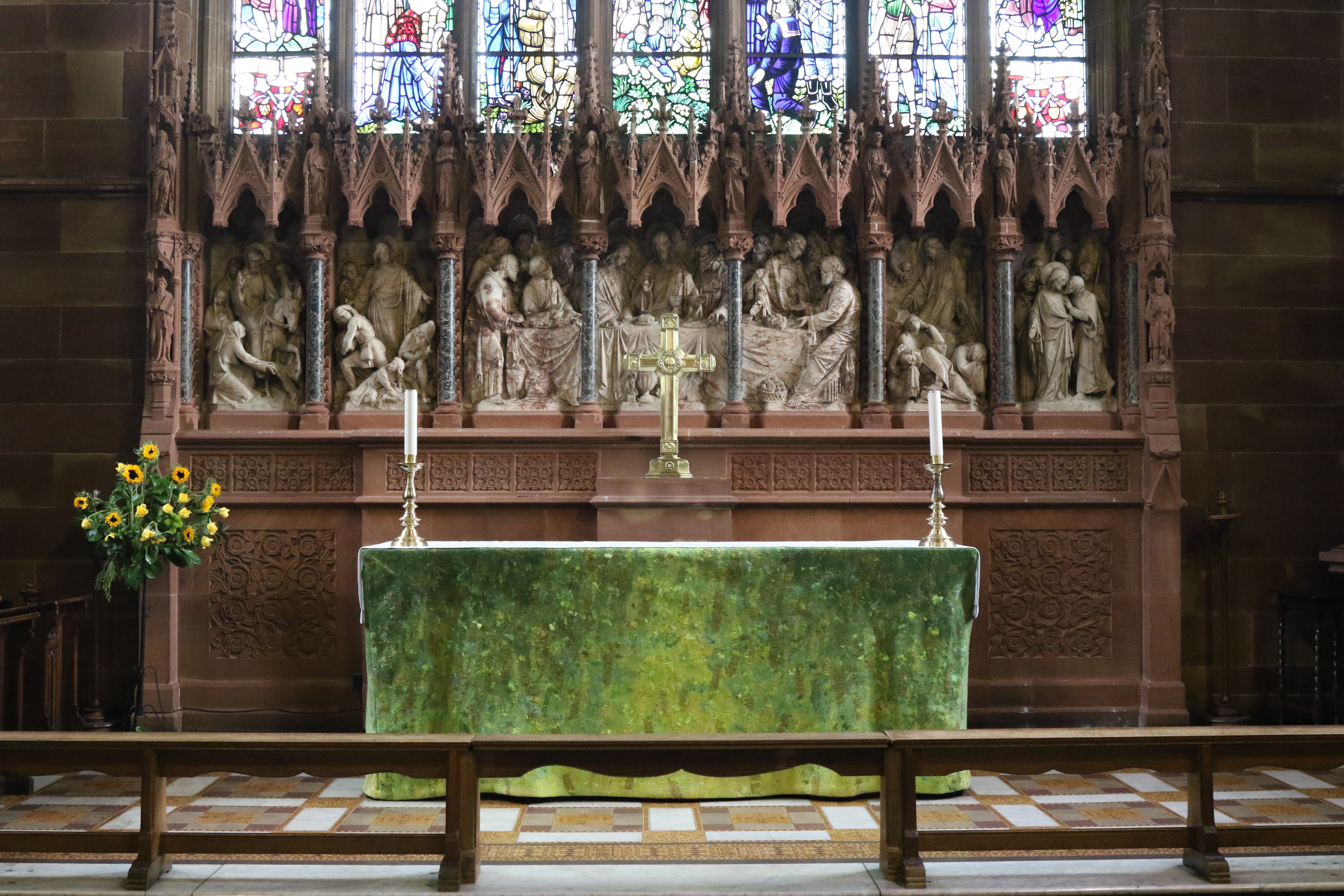
High altar

== Parish ==
The parish of St Martin's was extensive, covering a large portion of modern Birmingham. As new churches were constructed, parts of the parish were reassigned as follows:

- St Philips 1708 (added to in 1900)
- St George 1830
- All Saints 1830
- St Thomas 1830
- Bishop Ryder Church 1841
- St Mary's 1841
- St Paul's 1841 (added to in 1900)
- St Luke 1843
- St Mark 1843
- St Jude 1845
- St Bartholomew 1847 (part returned in 1939)
- St John 1854
- St Barnabas 1861
- Christ Church 1865
- St Gabriel 1869

== List of clergy ==
- Thomas de Hinkley 1300 – 1304
- Stephen de Segrave 1304 – 1304
- John de Ayleston 1304 – 1336
- Robert de Shuteford 1336 – 1349
- William de Seggeley 1349 – 1354
- Thomas de Dumbleton 1354 – 1369
- Hugh de Wolvesey 1369 – 1396
- Thomas Darnall 1396 – 1412
- William Thomas 1412 – 1414
- John Waryn 1428 – 1432
- William Hyde 1432 – 1433
- John Armstrong 1433 – 1433
- John Wardale 1433 – 1436
- Henry Cymon 1436 – 1444
- Humphrey Jurdan 1444 – ????
- Richard Button 1504 – 1536
- Richard Myddlemore 1536 – 1544
- William Wrixam 1544 – ????
- Luke (Lucas) Smith 1578 – 1646
- Samuel Wills 1646 – ????
- Samuel Slater 1659 – 1663
- John Riland 1663 – 1672
- Henry Grove 1672 – 1693
- William Dagget(t) 1693 – 1723
- Thomas Green 1723 – 1728
- Thomas (or Christopher) Tyrer 1728 – ????
- Richard Dovey 1732 – 1771
- Richard Chase 1771 – 1772
- John Parsons 1772 – 1779
- William Hinton 1779 – 1781
- Charles Curtis 1781 – 1829
- Thomas Moseley 1829 – 1846
- John Miller 1846 – 1866
- Canon William Wilkinson 1866 – 1896
- Arthur James Robinson 1897 – 1901
- Ven. John W. Diggle 1901 – 1905
- James Denton Thompson 1905 – 1912
- Canon John Wakefield Willink 1912 – 1919 (afterwards Dean of Norwich)
- Canon Edward Grose-Hodge 1919 – 1924
- Canon Travers Guy Rogers 1924 – 1948
- Canon Bryan Green 1949 – 1968/9
- Canon Albert Peter Hall (afterwards Bishop of Woolwich) 1968/9 – 1984
- Canon Philip Anthony Crowe (afterwards Principal of Salisbury and Wells Theological College) 1970 – 1977
- J. G. Wesson 1986 – 1995
- Canon Adrian Newman (afterwards Dean of Rochester then Bishop of Stepney) 1996 – 2005
- Canon Stewart William Jones 2005 – 2017

== Clock ==
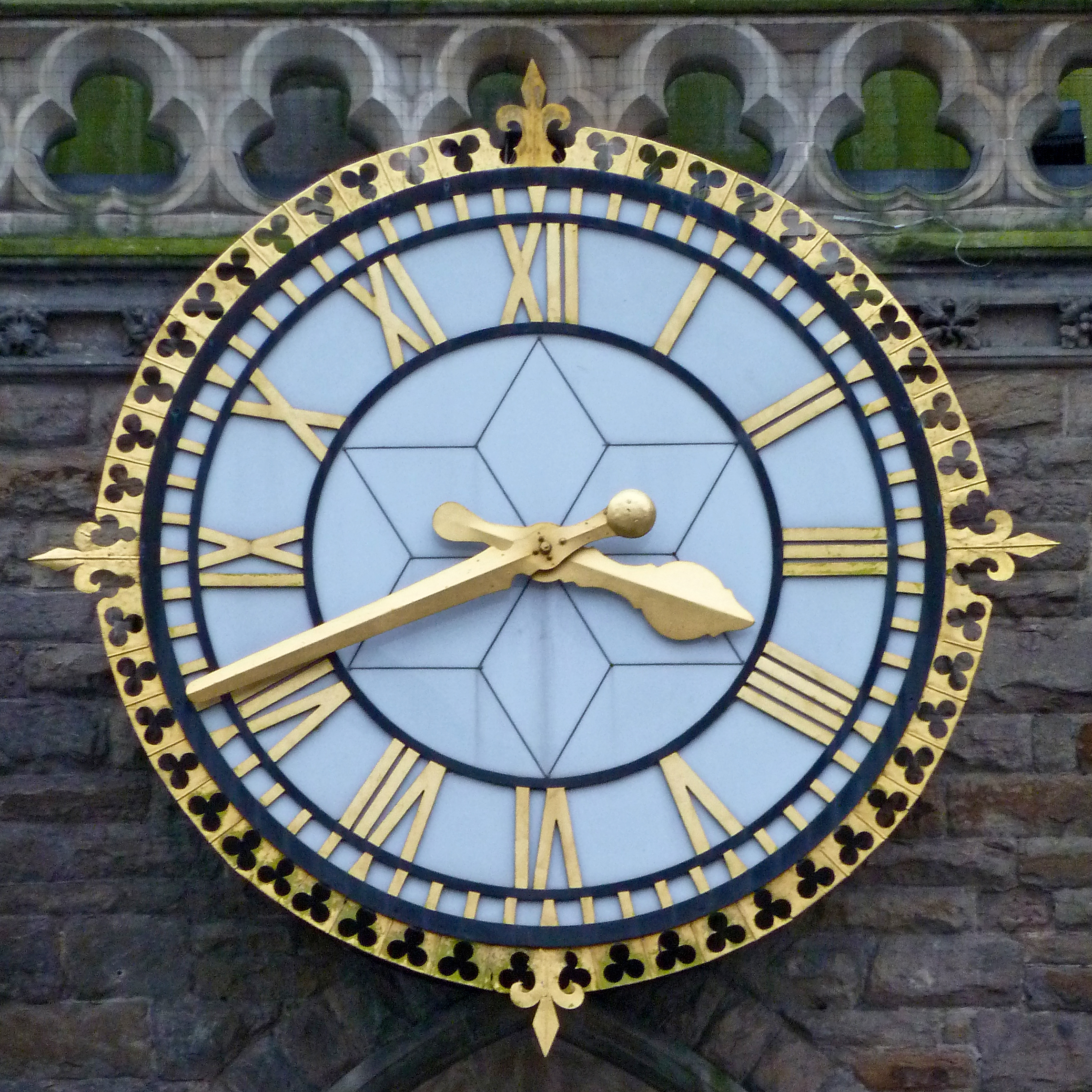
The clock dial

Although no record indicates when the first clock appeared in Birmingham, in 1547 the King's Commissioners reported that the Guild of the Holy Cross were responsible "for keeping the Clocke and the Chyme" at a cost of four shillings and four pence a year at St Martin's Church. The next recorded mention of a clock is in 1613. The earliest known clock makers in the town arrived in 1667 from London.

In 1797 the chimes were restored by Mr. Worton and played a different tune each day of the week. On Sunday “St George’s or 149th Psalm”, on Monday “Coldstream March”, on Tuesday “Rule Britannia”, on Wednesday “Haste to the Wedding”, on Thursday “God save the King”, on Friday “A Madrigal” and on Saturday “The lass of Pattie’s Mill”.

In 1858 the Mayor of Birmingham initiated a scheme to restore the clock, chime and bells and to illuminate the clock dial at night.

== Bells ==
There were four bells in 1552, together with a clock and chime. Six bells were put up in 1682. It is known that in 1745 when John Wesley preached in the Bull Ring the bells were rung in an attempt to drown his voice.

In July 1758 the eight bells were replaced by a new peal of ten, tenor weight 35 long cwt (1778 kg), cast by the Whitechapel Bell Foundry. These were subsequently augmented to twelve in 1772.

The first broadcast of church bells change ringing was of St Martin's. This was broadcast before a Sunday evening service in May 1924. The bells were recast in 1928 and an additional semitone bell was added in 1953. The frame in which the bells were rehung dated from 1869 and trouble with the frame led to a scheme of total renovation in 1991.

A new peal of sixteen bells (tenor weight 39 long cwt 1 qr 19 lb (4,415 lb or 2,003 kg)) hung for ringing was installed, being the first time more than twelve bells had been installed as a change ringing instrument. Sixteen is an unusual number; five, six, eight, ten or at the most twelve would be typical. As of 2024, only three rings of sixteen exist in the world.

== Organ ==
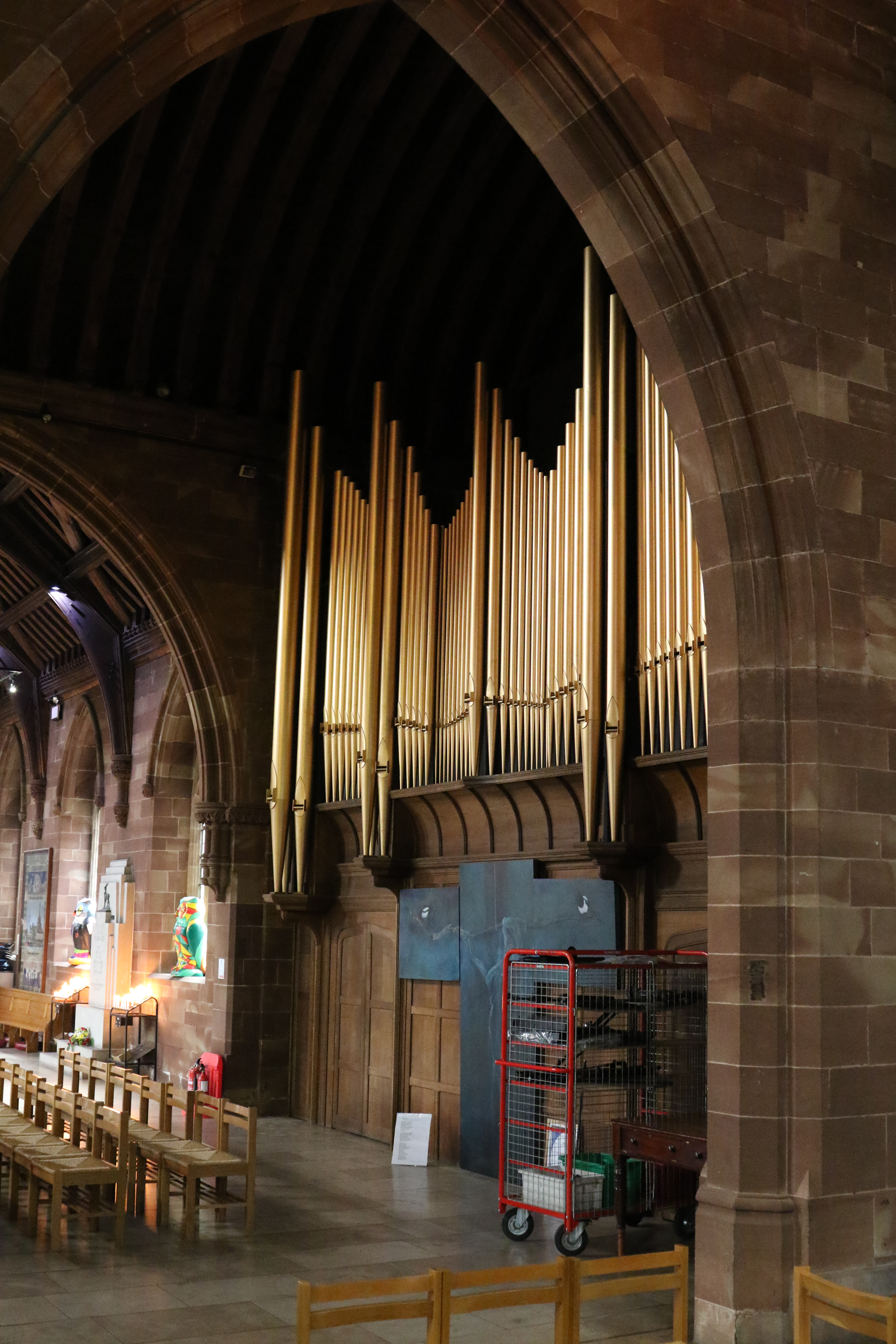
The organ screen in the north transept

The Guild of the Holy Cross at St. Martin's Church provided for an organist before the Reformation.

The church was presumably without an organ from the English Civil War as the churchwardens accounts read:

We the Minister, Churchwardens and inhabitants within the Parish of St. Martin's Birmingham being desirous to put up an organ in the said Parish Church have at a vestry called for this purpose unanimously agreed to raise the sum of 300l and upwards for competing the same, and for our selves, and in behalf of the rest of the Parishioneres have hereunto sett our hands this 17th day of May Anno Dom 1725.

An organ was duly erected by 1725 and the case was by Thomas Swarbrick. This organ was removed or replaced in 1822. The case was then transferred to St. Alphege's Church, Solihull by Rev Charles Curtis who was Rector of St. Martin's and Rector of St. Alphege, Solihull.

In 1822 a new organ was installed by Thomas Elliot. The organ was extended in 1855 by William Hill who provided pedal pipes of 2 octaves and 2 notes. He also revoiced the reeds and open diapason in the swell, and extended the swell organ to tenor c, enclosing it in a new Venetian swell-box. This organ was rebuilt by John Banfield & Son in 1875 and renovated and enlarged to 3 manuals and 40 stops by Banfield in 1883. In 1906 this was sold to St John's Church, Deritend.

The current pipe organ is by Harrison & Harrison and dates from 1906. Originally it was a three manual instrument on the north side of the chancel but in 1955 it was re-built as a four manual organ and moved to the north transept by John Compton. The opening recital was given by George Thalben-Ball on 30 March 1955. The specification of the organ can be found at the National Pipe Organ Register.

The organ continues to be played regularly, predominantly as part of the 9.30am Sunday worship, but also on occasion as part of 11am Sunday worship and the Tuesday lunchtime service. It is often played for those visiting the church on Sunday afternoons, and throughout the year for special events. It is also used for practice by organists of different levels wishing to enhance their playing skills.

=== Organists ===
- Barnabas Gunn 1740 – 1753 (jointly with St. Philip's)
- Richard Hobbs 1753 – 1771 (From St Martin's Church, Leicester)
- Joseph Harris 1771 – 1802 (formerly organist of St Laurence Church, Ludlow)
- John Chapman ca. 1814 - 1829 (afterwards organist at St Thomas' Church, Birmingham)
- William Bodell Taylor
- James Stimpson 1851 – 1857
- Walter Brooks 1857 – 1900 (formerly organist of St. Mary's Church, Atherstone)
- Williamson John Reynolds 1900 – 1920 (formerly organist of St Michael, Cornhill, afterwards organist of Church of the Holy Trinity, Stratford-upon-Avon)
- Richard Wassell 1920 – 1942 (afterwards organist of St. Alphege's Church, Solihull)
- Henry William Stubbington 1942 – 1947
- Norman Blake 1947–1949 (also Director of Music, Handsworth Grammar School)
- Geoffrey Fletcher ARCO 1949 -1982 (also Director of Music, George Dixon Grammar School)
- David Griffiths 1982 – 1985 (also Director of Music, King Edward VI Five Ways School)
- Richard Wardell 1986 – 1997
- Peter Churchill 1991 – 1997
