= Henry William Stubbington =

Henry William Stubbington FRCO LRAM ARCM LTCL (b. 1891) was an organist and composer based in England.

== Life ==
He was born in Upham in Hampshire in 1891, the son of Edward Stubbington and Eliza Jane. He was educated at Durham University.

He was director of music at Handsworth Grammar School from 1935 to He was appointed Professor of Music at the Birmingham School of Music in 1944.

== Appointments ==
- Assistant Organist of Winchester Cathedral 1912–1921
- Organist of St. Thomas' Parish Church, Newport, Isle of Wight
- Organist of St Martin in the Bull Ring 1942–1947

== Compositions ==
He composed

- Ring out, ye crystal spheres. A choral ode for 5 part chorus, soprano solo and orchestra

Cultural offices
Preceded by Richard Wassell	Organist of St Martin in the Bull Ring; 1942–1947	Succeeded by Norman Blake
