= Edward Grose-Hodge =

English cleric and academic

Edward Grose-Hodge (15 January 1855 – 2 April 1928) was a priest in the Church of England, a prebendary of St Paul’s Cathedral and Whitehead Professor of Divinity at the London College of Divinity.

== Career ==
Grose-Hodge was educated at Islington Proprietary School and St John's College, Highbury. He was ordained to the curacy of St Matthew’s Church, Bayswater, in 1878, and after seven years was asked to organise the Diocese of London for the Church of England Temperance Society. In 1887 he began a degree at Trinity Hall, Cambridge, graduating BA in 1890. In his final year at Cambridge he was elected President of the Cambridge Union. After five further years as a vicar, Grose-Hodge was appointed Whitehead Professor of Divinity at the London College of Divinity, remaining in post for 24 years, from 1895 to 1919. He was appointed a prebendary of St Paul’s Cathedral in 1911.

He was appointed:

- Vicar of Holy Trinity Church, Leicester 1890 - 1894
- Vicar of St James’ Church, Holloway 1894 - 1897
- Rector of Holy Trinity Church, Marylebone 1897 - 1911
- Vicar of St James' Church, Paddington 1911 - 1919
- Rector of St Martin in the Bull Ring 1919 - 1925

== Family ==
He married Florence Amy Smith in 1887 and they had four children:

- Florence Evelyn Grose-Hodge (1888–1912)
- Humfrey Grose-Hodge (1891–1962)
- Dorrien Edward Grose-Hodge (1893–1915)
- Geoffrey Goldingham Grose-Hodge (1896–1962)

== Notes ==
Church of England titles
| Preceded by John Willink | Rector of St Martin in the Bull Ring; 1919-1924 | Succeeded by Travers Guy Rogers |
