= St Mary's Church, Wythall =

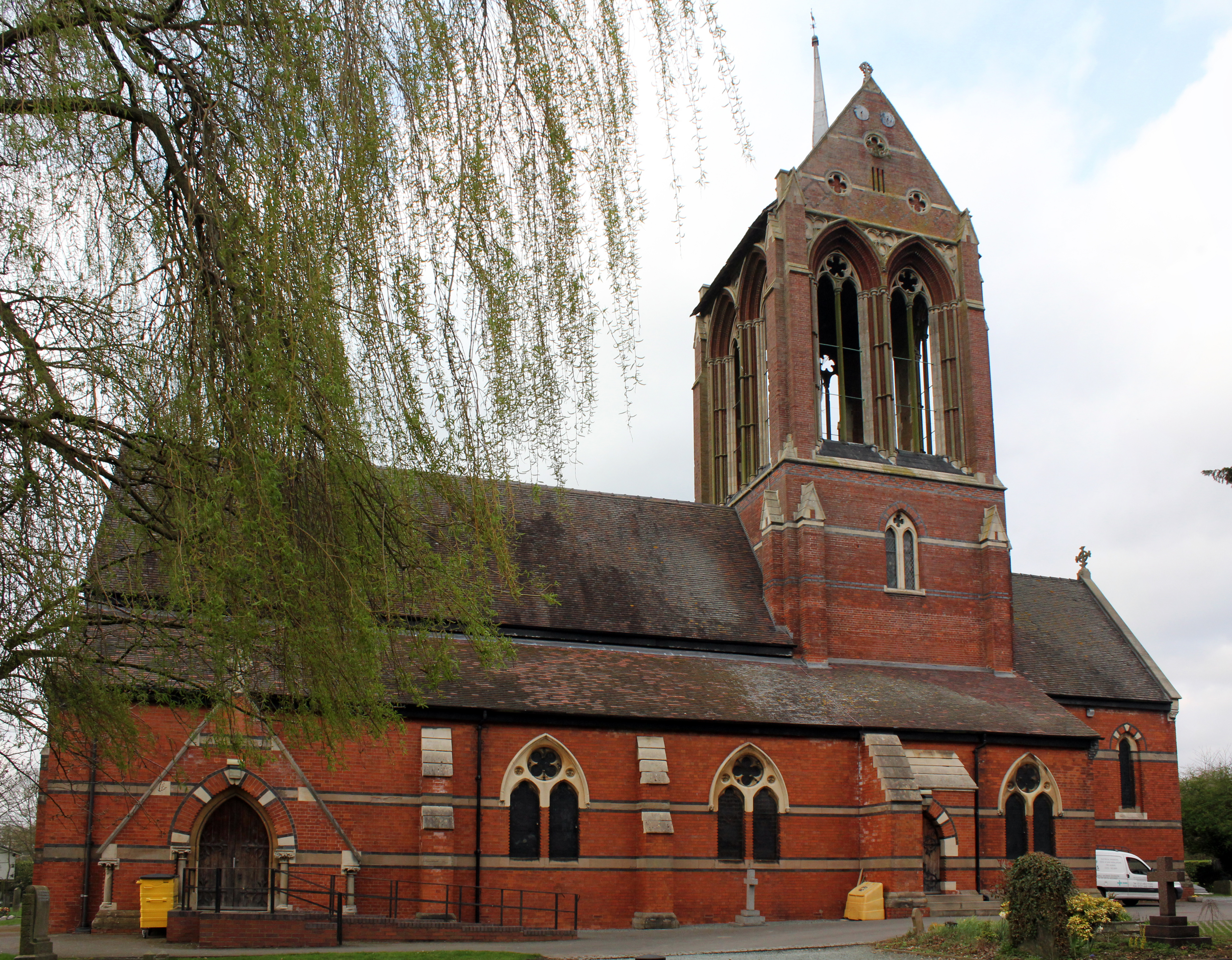
- St. Mary, Wythall
- St Mary's Church, Wythall
- 52°22′16.32″N 1°53′39.13″W
- Location: Wythall
- Country: England
- Denomination: Church of England

Administration
- Diocese: Anglican Diocese of Birmingham
- Parish: Wythall

St Mary's Church is a Grade II listed redundant parish church in Wythall, Worcestershire. St Mary's is a former Church of England church.

== History ==
The church was built in 1862 by Frederick Preedy. The landmark tower was added in 1908 by William Bidlake, the gift of the Misses Mynors in memory of their parents. The font was installed in the 1960s from Immanuel Church, Birmingham when this church was demolished.

The building closed for worship in 1986, and the building is now owned by a firm of electrical contractors. From 1987 to 2014 the congregation met in local school halls, most recently Coppice Primary School. At Easter 2014 the new St Mary's Church was opened on Shawhurst Lane in Hollywood, on the Coppice School site.

== Organ ==
The organ dates from 1908 by Nicholson and Co. A specification of the organ can be found on the National Pipe Organ Register.

== Churchyard ==
The churchyard contains the war graves of eight Commonwealth service personnel of the Second World War.

== Gallery ==
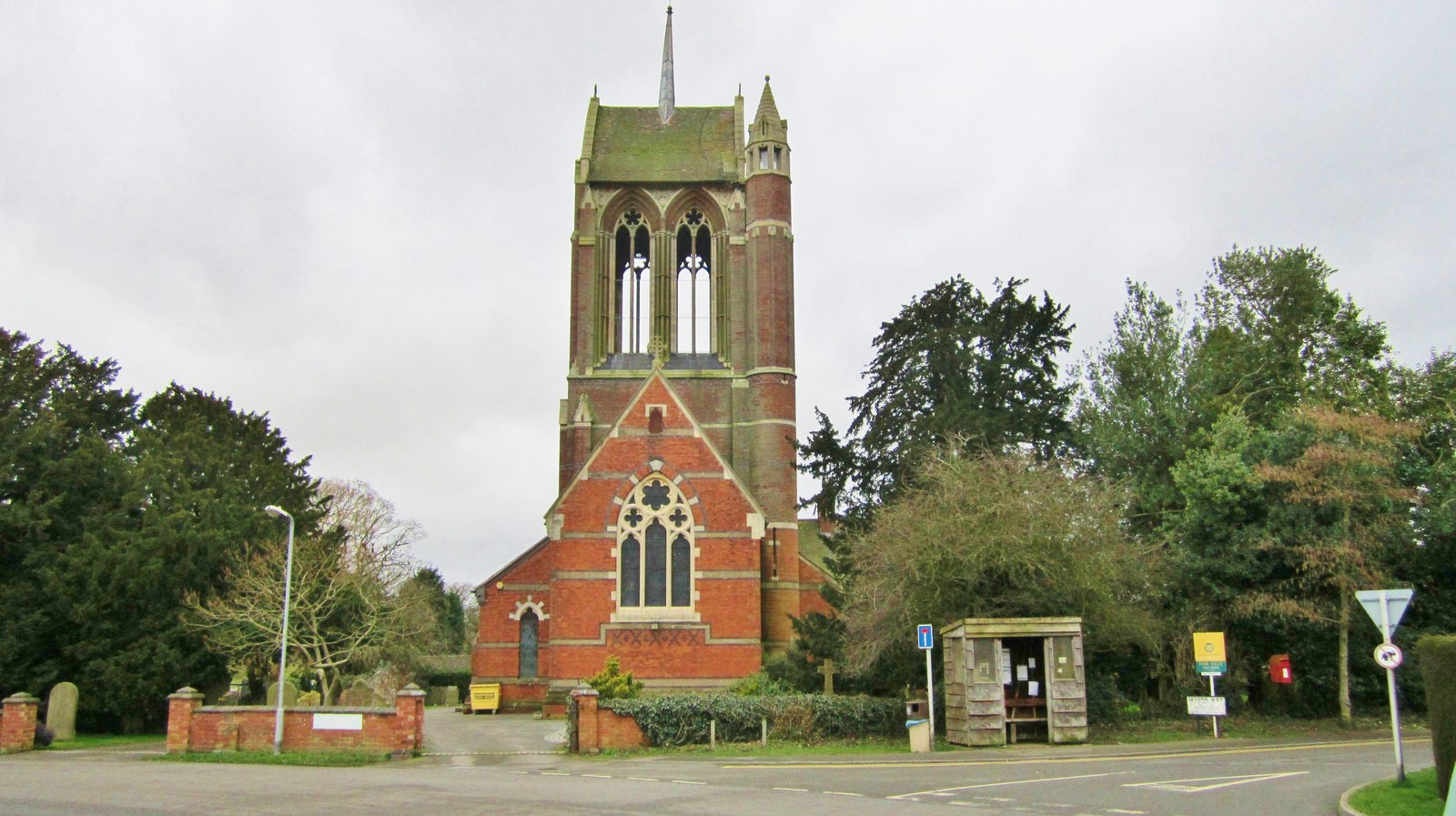

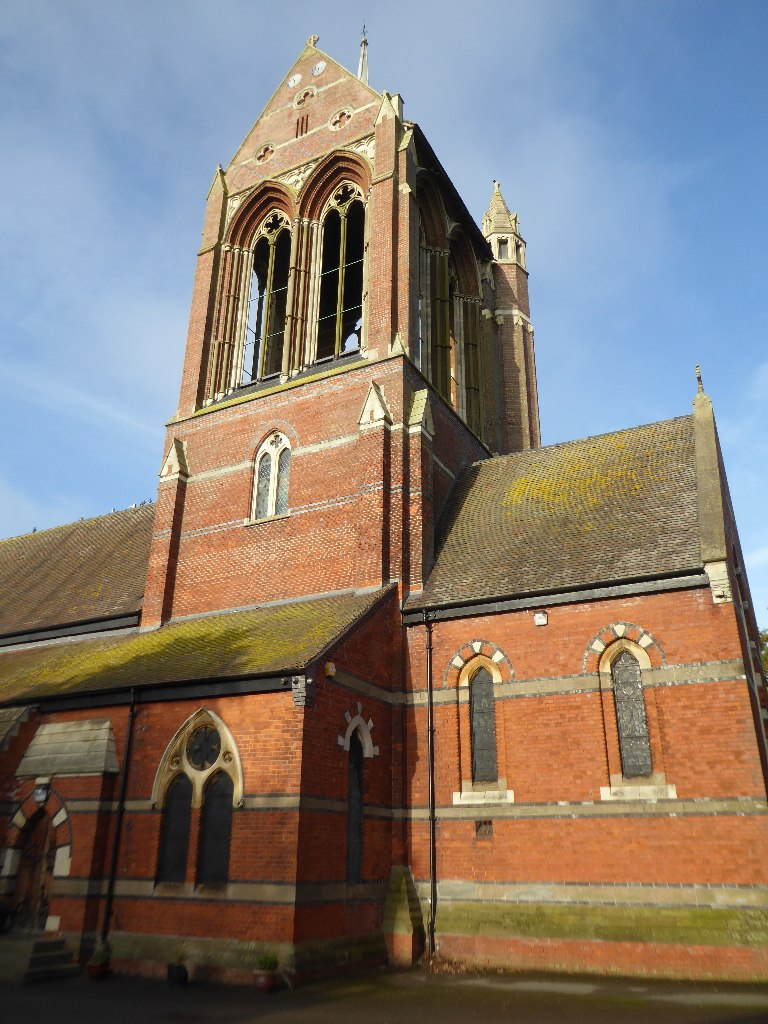

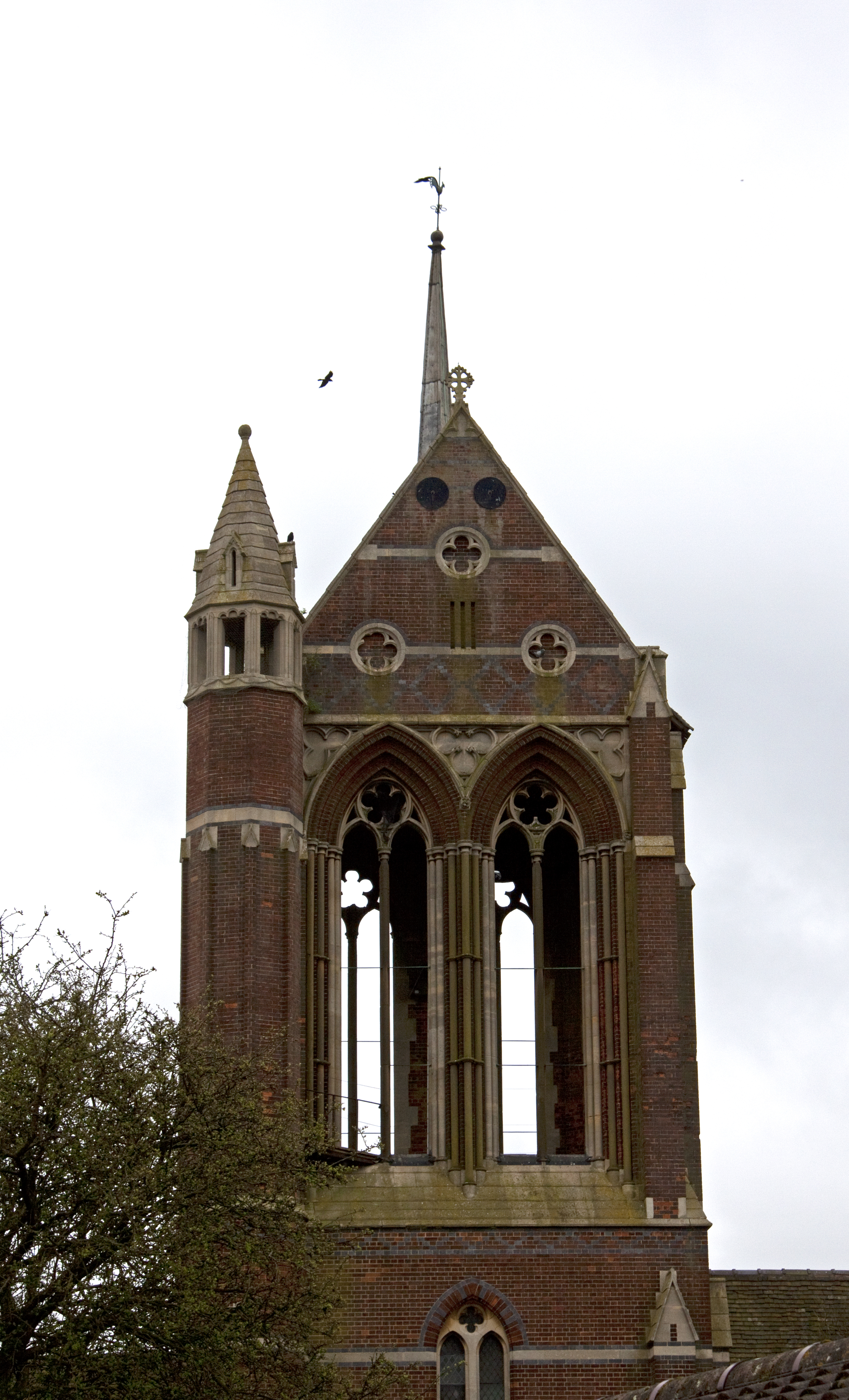

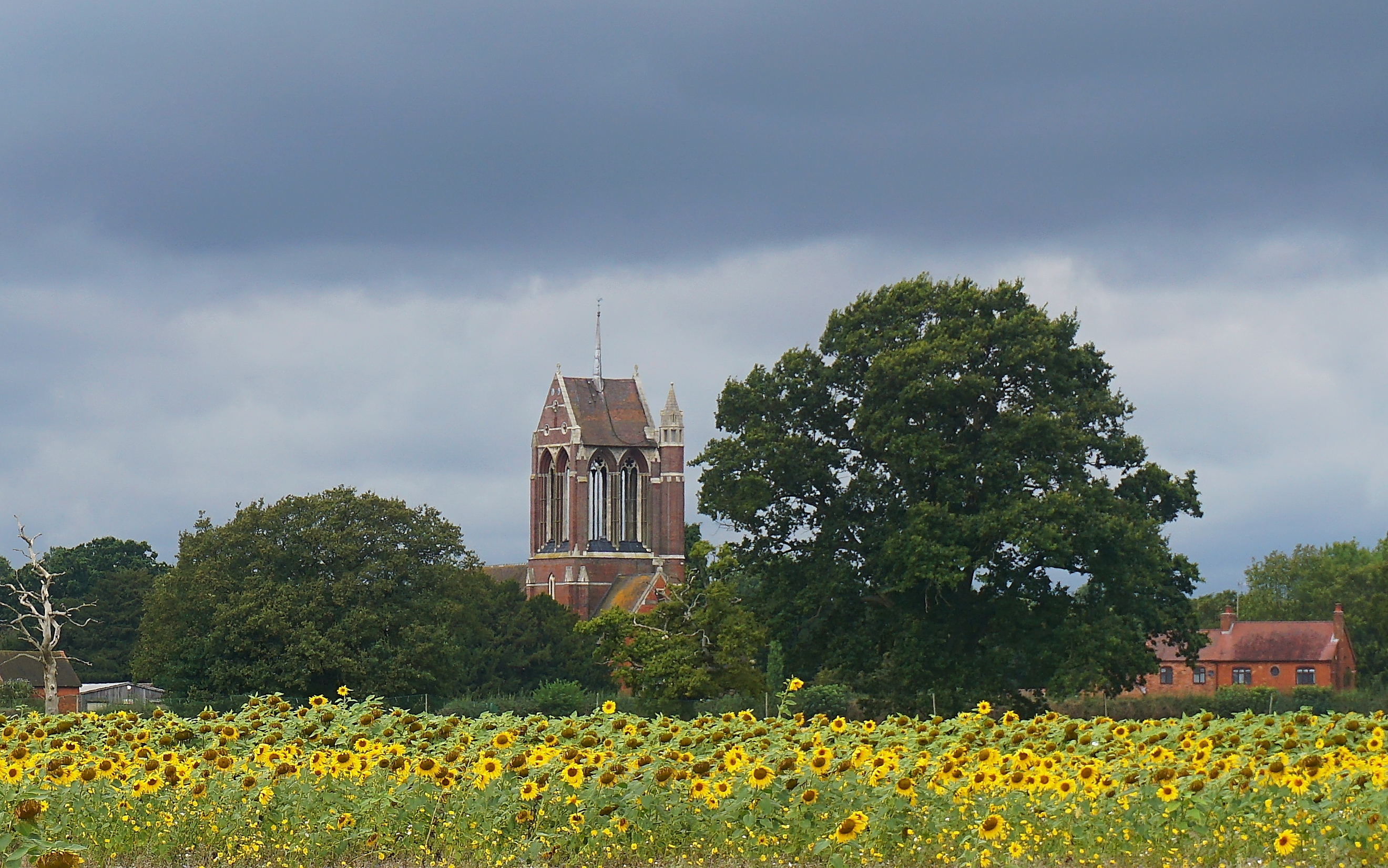
