= David Cranage =

British priest (1866–1957)

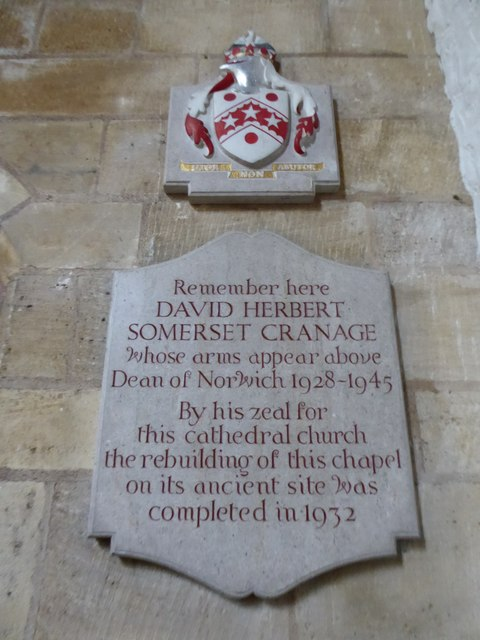
Memorial, Norwich Cathedral

David Herbert Somerset Cranage (10 October 1866 – 22 October 1957) was an Anglican Dean.

Born on 10 October 1866, the son of Dr Joseph Edward Cranage of Old Hall, Wellington, Shropshire, where the latter ran a boarding school he had founded.

he was educated at King's College, Cambridge. Ordained in 1897, he held curacies at Little Wenlock (1897–98) and Much Wenlock (1898–1902) in Shropshire. He was an academic at the University of Cambridge, where he lectured on mediaeval churches and was Secretary of the Local Lectures Syndicate, until his appointment as Dean of Norwich, a post he held for 19 years.

His published works include An Architectural Account of the Churches of Shropshire, The Home of the Monk, Loyalty and Order, Cathedrals and How They Were Built, and his autobiography Not Only a Dean, which was published in 1952.

He died on 22 October 1957, aged 91.

During his time in Much Wenlock he lived at 40 High Street, sometimes named Pinefield, an early 19th century dwelling house. In the late 20th century this fell into near-dereliction and was subject to a scheme of restoration and modernisation in 2020. Much Wenlock Civic Society erected a plaque on the property commemorating its significant former occupant.

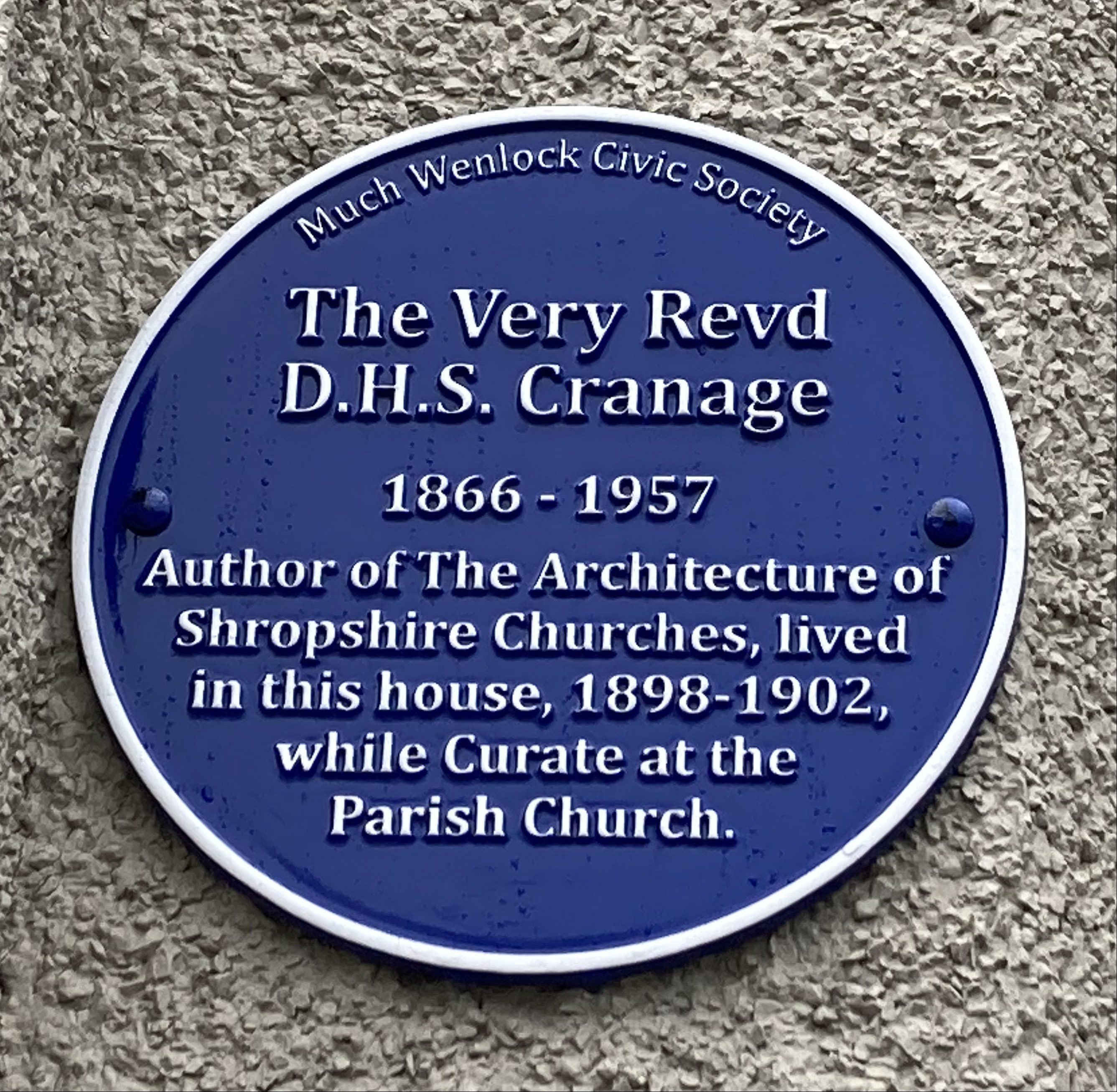

== Notes ==
Church of England titles
Preceded by John Wakefield Willink	Dean of Norwich; 1927–1946	Succeeded by Herbert St Barbe Holland
