= Walter James Bird =

Organ builder in Birmingham, England

Walter James Bird (10 January 1863 – 9 December 1953) was an organ builder based in Birmingham, England.

== Life ==
He was born in Birmingham on 10 January 1863, the son of Thomas and Sarah Bird and christened on 1 February in St. Thomas' Church, Birmingham. He married Ellen Oakes on 5 October 1884 in the same church, and they had the following children:

- Walter H Bird (b 1878)
- Amelia M Bird (b. 1886)
- Harold Bird (b. 1888)
- Elsie Lucy S Bird (b.1890)

He trained as an organ builder with Edward James Bossward in Birmingham and took over his business in 1883. He built, repaired and maintained many organs in the vicinity. In 1904 he was based at 81 Latimer Street, Birmingham.

He died on 9 December 1953.

== Works ==
He installed organs at the following churches

- St Bartholomew's Church, Allen's Cross 1888
- St. Thomas' Church, Birmingham 1893 enlargement
- Emmanuel Church, Broad Street, Birmingham 1896
- St John's Church, Deritend 1906
- Knowle Parish Church
- St Paul's Church, Dosthill 1914
- St Andrew's Church of England, Handsworth, Birmingham 1926
