= St Gabriel's Church, Deritend =

St Gabriel’s Church, Deritend
- St Gabriel’s Church, Deritend
- 52°28′41.4″N 1°53′3.7″W
- Location: Birmingham
- Country: England
- Denomination: Church of England

History
- Dedication: St Gabriel
- Consecrated: 5 January 1869

Architecture
- Architect: J A Chatwin
- Groundbreaking: 10 October 1867
- Completed: 1869
- Construction cost: £4,200
- Closed: 1945

Specifications
- Capacity: 750 people

St Gabriel’s Church, Barn Street, Deritend is a former Church of England parish church in Birmingham.

== History ==
The foundation stone was laid by Frederick Elkington on 10 October 1867 and the Bishop of Worcester.

The church was designed by J A Chatwin and the contractor was Wilson and Son of Soho, Birmingham. It was consecrated on 25 June 1868 by the Bishop of Worcester. Blews and Sons provided the gas fittings, communion table, brass lectern, reading desk and chancel chairs.

A parish was created in 1869 from parts of the parishes of St Martin in the Bull Ring and St Bartholomew’s Church, Birmingham. It was enlarged in 1939 with a further part of the parish of St. Bartholomew’s.

The church was damaged in an air raid in 1941 during the Second World War and closed in 1945 and the parish was united with St Basil's Church, Deritend.
