= Bryan Green (priest) =

English author & priest (1901–1993)

Bryan Stuart Westmacott Green (14 January 1901 – 6 March 1993) was an author and priest, and was described as one of the most effective evangelists in the Church of England and the “Anglican Billy Graham".

== Career ==
As well as his work within each parish he was appointed to, he spent three months per year on missions outside the parish. His ministry in the United States of America was received to great acclaim. When he appeared in Cathedral of St John the Divine in New York City in 1948, he attracted a crowd of 10,000.

His oratory drew great congregations to St Martin in the Bull Ring where he was parish priest for over 20 years. On his first Sunday, he attracted 1,200, compared to the more usual 100.

He was appointed:

- Curate of New Malden 1924 - 1928
- Chaplain of Oxford Pastorate 1931 - 1934
- Vicar of Christ Church, Crouch End 1934 - 1938
- Vicar of Holy Trinity Brompton 1938 - 1948
- Rector of St Martin in the Bull Ring Birmingham 1948 - 1969
- Honorary Canon of St Philip's Cathedral, Birmingham 1950 - 1970

== Family ==
He married Winifred Bevan in 1926 and they had one daughter (Gillian) one son (Mark). He died in March 1993 aged 92.

== Publications ==
- The Practice of Evangelism. Charles Scribner’s Sons, New York 1951.
- Saints Alive. Forward Movement Publications. 1977.

Church of England titles
Preceded by Travers Guy Rogers	Rector of St Martin in the Bull Ring; 1949-1970	Succeeded by Albert Peter Hall
