= Knowle Parish Church =

Church building in Knowle, England

Coordinates: 52°23′16.9″N 1°44′2.41″W

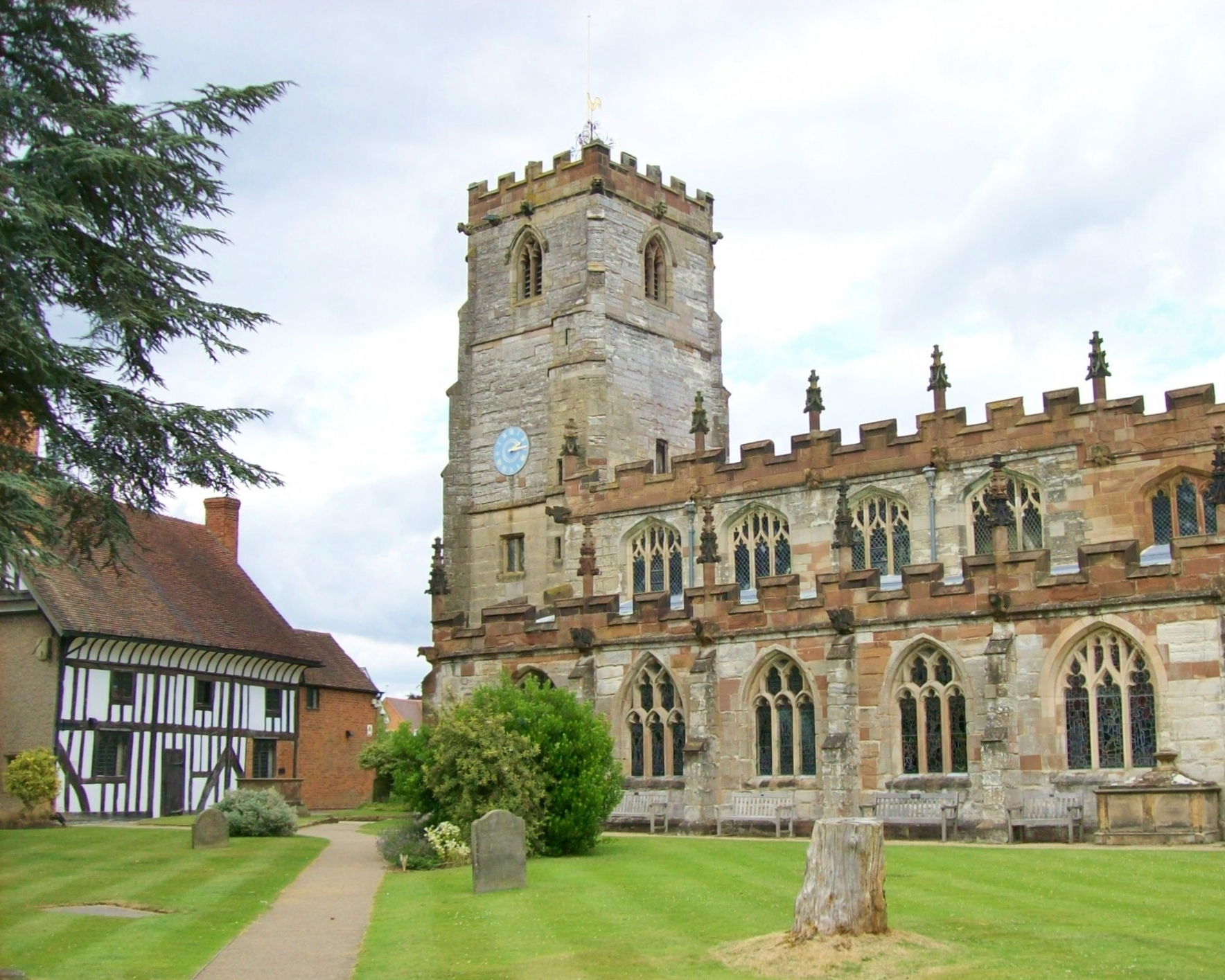
- Knowle Parish Church

- Location within the West Midlands
- OS grid reference: SP 18238 76734
- Location: Knowle, West Midlands
- Country: England
- Denomination: Church of England
- Website: kpc.org.uk

History
- Dedication: St John the Baptist, St Lawrence and St Anne
- Consecrated: 24 February 1403

Architecture
- Heritage designation: Grade I listed

Administration
- Diocese: Birmingham
- Archdeaconry: Aston
- Deanery: Solihull
- Parish: Knowle

Knowle Parish Church is a Grade I listed parish church in the Church of England in Knowle, West Midlands.

== History ==
The church dates from the 15th century. It is thought to have been consecrated on 24 February 1403. A college was founded in the church in 1416 which existed until 1547. It is noted for its high chancel with a processional subway from north to south.

From 1403 to 1858 it was a daughter church of Hampton. There was a restoration in 1860. In 1900 there was a further restoration costing £1,000, which included the building of a new organ chamber, clergy and choir vestry, supervised by the architect J.A. Chatwin. The organ and choir were moved from the north transept to the north side of the chancel. The north chapel was opened out to the church, and the old stalls removed from the end of the south aisle to the choir.

== Organ ==
The church organ was built by Walter James Bird. A specification of the organ can be found on the National Pipe Organ Register.

== Bells ==
Three of the peal of eight date from 1931, with the rest recast in 1979, all by John Taylor of Loughborough.
