= Richard Wassell =

Dr Richard Wassell (14 November 1880 – 1949) FRCO was a composer and organist based in Birmingham.

== Life ==
He was born in Tipton, Staffordshire in 1880, the son of Richard Wassell and Matilda Spare. He studied organ under Charles W. Perkins, Birmingham City Organist.

He was conductor of the Birmingham City Police Band from 1922–1942 and chorus master and conductor of the Birmingham City Chorus and Birmingham Choral Society. He was also musical director at the Birmingham and Midland Institute.

He was awarded the Lambeth Degree of Mus. Doc. by the Archbishop of Canterbury, Cosmo Gordon Lang in 1939.

He married Annie Groves in 1905; they had four children:

- Richard Wassell b. 1907
- Mary Wassell b. 1909
- James Wassell b.1914
- Joan Wassell b.1918

== Appointments ==
- Organist at Birmingham Parish Church 1920–1942
- Organist at St. Alphege's Church, Solihull 1942–1949

Cultural offices
| Preceded by Williamson John Reynolds | Organist of St Martin in the Bull Ring; 1920–1942 | Succeeded by Henry William Stubbington |

== Compositions ==
He wrote:

- Jesu the very thought of thee
- He that hath pity upon the poor
- How Sweet the Name of Jesus sounds
- Who shall ascend
- Sweet Saviour, bless us ere we go
- Overture for Military Bands
- Overture put use Fete Religieuese
