= Edward James Bossward =

English organ builder (1825–1883)

Edward James Bossward (1825 – 18 September 1883) was an English organ builder based in Birmingham.

== Life ==
He was born in Hayes in 1825 and baptised on 22 May 1825, the son of Thomas Bossward and Jane Collinridge. He married Eliza Gisborne in 1848 in King’s Norton, and they had ten children.

He trained as an organ builder with J.C. Bishop and then worked for William Hill. He came to Birmingham with Hill to work on the organ in Birmingham Town Hall, and to care for it after completion.

In 1847, he set up business on his own, first at 30 Oliver Road, and later at 80 Alston Street, Ladywood. In 1869 he was declared bankrupt. One of his pupils Walter James Bird continued the business after he died in 1883.

== Works ==
He installed or worked on organs at the following churches:

- St Alphege's Church, Solihull 1850 Alterations and extension
- St Mary's Church, Moseley 1853. New Organ.
- All Saints Church, Allesley. 1863
- St Jude's Church, Birmingham 1867 New Organ now in St Michael and All Angels Church, Exeter
- Trinity Wesleyan Chapel, Wolverhampton 1867 New Organ
- St Alphege's Church, Solihull 1868 Alterations and extension
- St Philip’s Church, Birmingham 1869 Cleaning, repairs and improvements.
- Lichfield Cathedral 1881 Overhaul
