= St Bartholomew's Church, Birmingham =

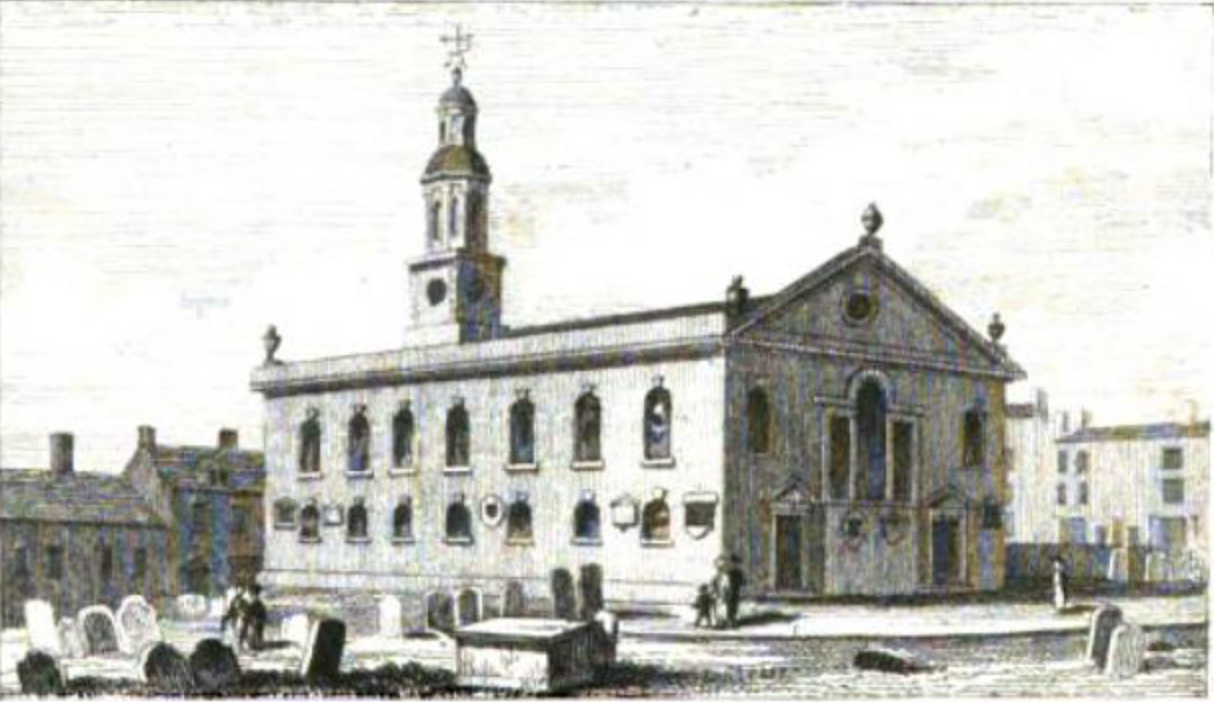
- St Bartholomew's Church, Birmingham, from An historical and descriptive sketch of Birmingham. Bailey, Knott and Beilby. 1 July 1828
- St Bartholomew's Church, Birmingham
- 52°28′54.4″N 1°53′24.6″W
- Location: Birmingham
- Country: England
- Denomination: Church of England

History
- Dedication: St Bartholomew

Architecture
- Architect(s): William Hiorne and David Hiorne
- Style: Neo classical
- Completed: 1749
- Closed: 1937
- Demolished: 1943

Specifications
- Capacity: 800 people

St Bartholomew's Church, Masshouse Lane, Digbeth, Birmingham was a Church of England parish church in Birmingham, England.

== History ==
The site for the church was given by John Jennens on land at Masshouse formerly occupied by the Roman Catholic Chapel and convent in 1687, and the building was designed by William Hiorne and David Hiorne and opened as a chapel of ease to St Martin in the Bull Ring in 1749. It was enlarged in 1840-1841 and it became a parish church in its own right in 1847. A previous attempt at this had failed in 1772. It was restored in 1893 at a cost of £800.

Part of its parish was taken in 1869 to form the parish of St Gabriel's Church, Deritend.

The church was closed in 1937, damaged in an air raid in 1942 and demolished in 1943. Part of the parish was assigned to Bishop Ryder Church, Birmingham.

== Organ ==
The organ was installed in 1806 by George Pike England. A specification of the organ can be found on the National Pipe Organ Register.
