= Hurley and Wood End =

- Ward
- Sovereign state: United Kingdom
- Constituent country: England
- Region: West Midlands
- Administrative county: Warwickshire
- District: North Warwickshire
- Admin. HQ: Wood End (De facto)

Government
  - Type: Ward
  - Councillors: Ann Lewis (Lab), Hayden Phillip (Lab)
- Time zone: UTC+0 (Greenwich Mean Time)
  - Summer (DST): UTC+1 (British Summer Time)
- Postcode: CV and B
- Ethnicity: 99.5% White British
- Website: Kingsbury Parish Council

Hurley and Wood End is a ward within North Warwickshire, it is named after the villages of Hurley and Wood End, the ward also contains the villages of Piccadilly, Hurley Common and Foul End. The ward is covered by Kingsbury Civil Parish.

== Profile ==
The ward is within the mining area of the Warwickshire Coalfield. There were two mines in the ward one being Kingsbury Colliery near Piccadilly which closed 1968 and Dexter Colliery in Hurley which closed in the 1980s. Kingsbury Oil Terminal also lies within the Ward. Because of the wards status as an old mining community it is considered a Safe Labour seat.

== Settlements ==
=== Wood End ===
Wood End is the largest settlement in the village and is home to both councillors of the ward, Wood End dates from 1890 and is an old Pit village it has a school, a church and several shops, a village hall and a garage.

=== Hurley ===
Hurley the oldest village is the ward and the second largest Hurley dates from before the mining era of the 1890s. it has a shop, a school, a church, 2 pubs (The Anchor Inn also The Holly Bush Inn) and a village hall.

=== Piccadilly ===
Piccadilly is a Hamlet in the ward, it is the newest settlement in the ward dating from 1904 and is named after Piccadilly in London, Piccadilly is the only settlement with a Birmingham (B) postcode.

=== Foul End ===
Foul End is an area to the south of Hurley, Foul End Consists of several farms.

=== Hurley Common ===
Hurley Common is the smallest settlement in the ward and is just a simple hamlet with a pub.

== Election results ==
Local Election 2011: Hurley and Wood End (2 Councillors)
Party	Candidate	Votes	%	±%
Labour	✓ Ann Lewis	671	30%	−0.2%
Labour	✓ Hayden Phillips	630	28.2%	+0.5%
Conservative	✗ Richard Freer	320	14.3%	−8.7%
Conservative	✗ Howard Smith	293	13.1%	−6%
Independent	✗ Ian Frederick Thomas	163	7.3%	N/A
Independent	✗ Tony Moppett	158	7%	N/A
Majority		688	58.2%	+0.3%
Labour hold		Swing	N/A	

Local Election 2007: Hurley and Wood End (2 Councillors)
Party	Candidate	Votes	%	±%
Labour	✓ Ann Lewis	582	30.2%	N/A
Labour	✓ Hayden Phillips	534	27.7%	N/A
Conservative	✗ Lee Clarke	443	23%	N/A
Conservative	✗ Andrew David Watkins	368	19.1%	N/A
Majority		305	57.9	N/A
Labour hold		Swing	N/A	
