= Foul End =

Hamlet in Warwickshire, England

Coordinates: 52.550°N 1.646°W

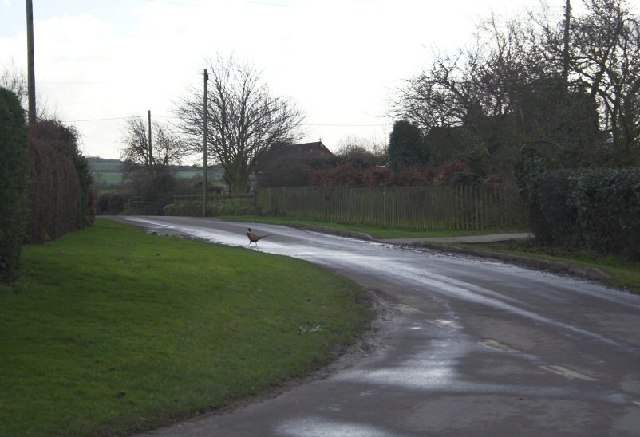
- A pheasant in Foul End

- Location within Warwickshire
- OS grid reference: SP239947
- Civil parish: Kingsbury
- District: North Warwickshire
- Shire county: Warwickshire
- Region: West Midlands
- Country: England
- Sovereign state: United Kingdom
- Post town: Atherstone
- Postcode district: CV9
- Dialling code: 01827
- Police: Warwickshire
- Fire: Warwickshire
- Ambulance: West Midlands
- UK Parliament: North Warwickshire

Foul End is a small hamlet in the civil parish of Kingsbury, in the North Warwickshire district, in the county of Warwickshire, England. Other nearby places include Hurley, Wood End, Hurley Common, Coleshill, Water Orton, Curdworth, Atherstone and Tamworth.

== Governance ==
The village was part of the Tamworth Rural District from its creation in 1894, until 1965 when it became part of the Atherstone Rural District. In 1974 under the Local Government Act 1972 Foul End became part of the newly formed district of North Warwickshire. Inside North Warwickshire it is part of the Hurley and Wood End Ward.

Foul End is part of the North Warwickshire constituency.

== History ==
The name "Foul End" means 'Dirty clearing end' or 'well-watered land' and was the home of William de Fouleye and Henry de Fouleye. Foul End was "Fouleye" in 1315 and 1327, "Foulend" in 1591 and "Fowle end" in 1609 and 1672.

There are several historic cottages located at Foul End. Orchard Cottage is predominantly red brick, with some 17th-century masonry and timber construction. The open-beamed ceilings include substantial chamfered beams. It has rough-cast walls and a central chimney from the 17th century with three separate square shafts. New House Farm, located to the latter's east, features 17th-century timber construction and a central chimney stack.

== Public Services ==
Water and sewage services are provided by Severn Trent Water.

The nearest police and fire stations are in Coleshill.

Unlike Kingsbury Foul End uses a Coventry (CV) postcode rather than a Birmingham (B) postcode. The postal town is Atherstone.

== Health ==
The village lies in the North Warwickshire NHS trust area. The village does not have its own doctor's surgery or pharmacy The nearest GP's surgeries can be found in and Hurley. The George Eliot Hospital at Nuneaton is the area's local hospital. It has an Accident and Emergency Department. Out of hours GP services are also based at George Eliot. There is also Good Hope Hospital in Sutton Coldfield.

== Education ==
There is a nearby primary school for children up to the age of 11 in Hurley. The village does not have its own secondary school, so most students attend Kingsbury School in Kingsbury. In terms of further education the area is served by North Warwickshire and Hinckley College at Nuneaton. There is also Tamworth and Lichfield College.

== Transport ==
Foul End lies close to the M42 at junction 9.

No bus services serve the village and the nearest railway station is Coleshill Parkway in the town of Coleshill.

The nearest airport is Birmingham.

== Media ==
The local newspaper covering the area is the Tamworth Herald, which has a separate edition for North Warwickshire There is also the Atherstone Recorder.

Local radio includes BBC CWR, Hits Radio Coventry & Warwickshire and Capital Mid-Counties.

The village is covered by the Central ITV and BBC West Midlands TV regions broadcast from the nearby Sutton Coldfield transmitting station.
