= Nether Whitacre =

Village in Warwickshire, England

Coordinates: 52.53°N 1.660°W

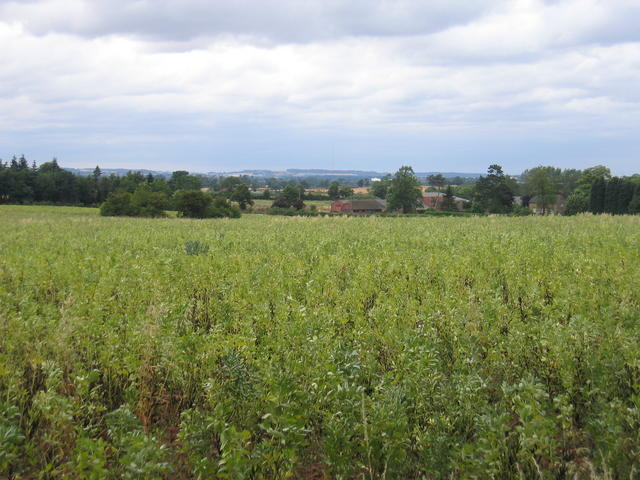
- Downhill view to Whitacre Hall, Nether Whitacre

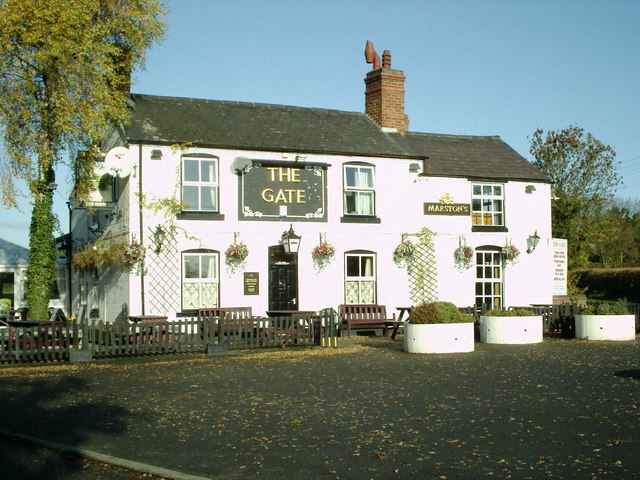
- The Gate 'Pub'

- Location within Warwickshire
- Population: 1,078 (2021)
- OS grid reference: SP2392
- Civil parish: Nether Whitacre
- District: North Warwickshire
- Shire county: Warwickshire
- Region: West Midlands
- Country: England
- Sovereign state: United Kingdom
- Post town: BIRMINGHAM
- Postcode district: B46
- Dialling code: 01675
- Police: Warwickshire
- Fire: Warwickshire
- Ambulance: West Midlands
- UK Parliament: North Warwickshire

Nether Whitacre /ˈwɪtəkər/ is a small village and larger rural civil parish in North Warwickshire, Warwickshire, England.

== Topography ==
It is one of 'The Whitacres': Nether Whitacre, Over Whitacre and Whitacre Heath which are in the upper valley of the River Tame on its eastern side. Its shape is roughly square with a north western outcrop (salient) largely covered by railway lines and lakes.

== Localities ==
=== Whitacre Heath ===
Whitacre Heath is built on the heath which was a mixture of common land and manorial waste traditionally, useful for agriculture with the most fertile and well-drained land being in the village itself. Elevations range from 122m AOD in the east to 65m in the north-west corner of the parish. Land slopes from west to east with the eastern border being the slightly altered, early meander of the River Tame.

=== Botts Green ===
This is a hall and a few cottages. Half of the hamlet is in Nether Whitacre and half is in Over Whitacre. The hall itself in this parish is Grade II* listed for its architecture, which has its date of main construction inscribed and recorded which is 1593 (in the reign of Elizabeth I). Typical of manor houses and farmhouses of that era the main entrance gives access to a stone vaulted cross passage between the backs of 2 fireplaces. The kitchen fireplace to the south is plain but the massive fireplace in the main room has a Tudor arch and a frieze with shallow pilasters carved with fleur-de-lys above fluting.

=== Hoggrills End ===
This southwestern part of the village is first a cluster of farms and cottages, four of which are c.1800 and listed (for two of which below, being made out of stone rather than brick). Beyond this is then a railway junction before becoming a developed residential, small linear development by the River Tame along station road. This stretch overlooks the Ladywalk Nature reserve on the opposite bank, beyond which is the Hams Hall National Distribution Park, used for storage of goods. It is bounded, to the south, by the Shustoke Reservoir. To the southwest of this area is a fresh water treatment works, including for a Grade II listed Victorian pumping station, serving part of the region, Blythe End water mill and to the west the Coleshill Industrial Park.

== History ==
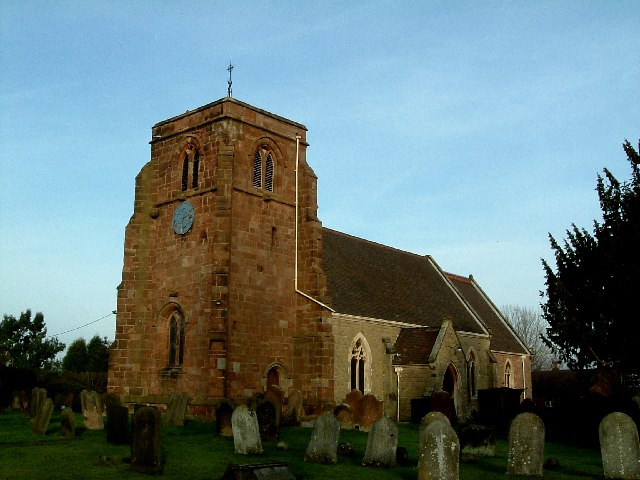
Church of St Giles

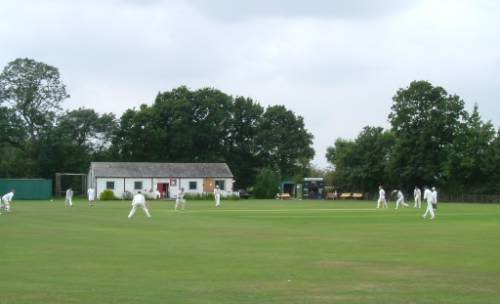
Nether Whitacre Cricket Club

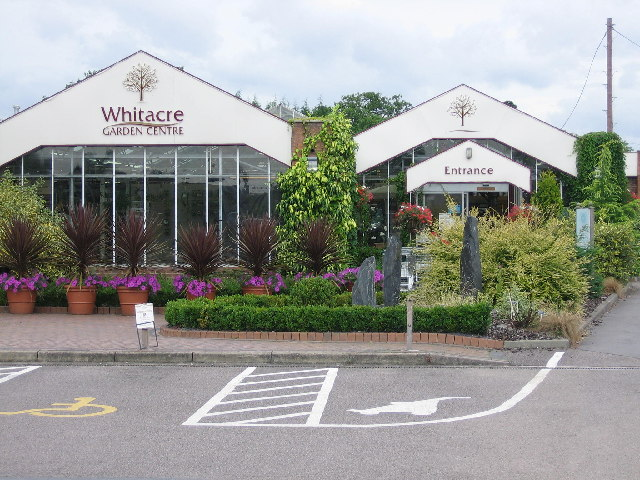
Whitacre Garden Centre

Objects belonging to a much earlier Neolithic and Bronze Age times have been found in the soil. The village appears in the Domesday Book, where it is noted as already being held by Wulfric in the Saxon period. By 1086, its eight households rendered only £0.5 a year and its lord of the manor was Edwin who held under Thorkil of Warwick, its overlord, a relatively unusual name being strongly norse rather than a hybrid or Norman. It had an additional listing of one household, held under Robert of Vessey that rendered 2s (£0.1) a year. However, Whitacre was in the early medieval period recorded as 'Witecore', which still means 'white acre' thus 'white field'.

Whitacre Hall, the manor house, perches next to the village on the northwestern slopes and is a double moated hall. The present structure dates from the Tudor period. At the height of the Industrial Revolution this was the home of the Jennens family, who were some of the early Ironmasters. John Jennens supplied Birmingham blacksmiths with iron bars and then sold their products. Its extent has within it about half a dozen stone built buildings of the 17th and 18th centuries, such as Church House, the Old House and the Malthouse in Hoggrill End. Nether Whitacre has a cricket club which was established officially in 1887. Four public houses in this area host an array of evening entertainments:

- The Swan
- The Railway
- The Gate
- The Dog

All of these were established in the late 1800s. The hamlet of Furnace End, Over Whitacre probably derives its name from iron smelting furnaces owned by the Jennens. Charles Jennens was a friend of Handel, the composer. An Earl of Aylesford, the noble Finch family of Packington Hall in the county, was a cousin to the Jennens and obtained an organ for Handel, which was installed at Great Packington church. Very rural, the population of the 1,995 acres (807 ha) was:

- 1911, 606;
- 1921, 726;
- 1931, 748

== Church ==
The Parish Church is St Giles's Church. It contains some 14th century glass and a 16th-century West Tower but most of the church is of 1870s restoration. The Parish Register dates from 1439, making it one of the earliest in the area. This was held with its advowson (right to name a priest) at least until 1545. In 1580, however, Sir John Throckmorton died holding it of the Queen as of the manor of East Greenwich. It passed to the Crown on the attainder of his Catholic son, Sir Francis Throckmorton, in 1584, thereafter for a few years held by John Cowper and William Kente. On 15 November 1589 the Queen granted the rectory to Sir Edward Stanley, but in 1594 it was conveyed by Ambrose and John Cowper to Edward Brabazon. By 1631 it had reunited with the advowson in the Earl of Meath's possession who in 1631 sold it and the manor to Sir John and Sir Robert King.

== Sports and recreation ==
Nether Whitacre has a long established cricket club that was officially formed in 1887 however records indicate that matches were played as Nether Whitacre as early as July 1880. The club moved on to its current ground in 1907. The club nickname is "The Ducks" after the similarity of the Swan on the club logo to a Duck and also an incident in the club's history when the club became one of the first ever instances of a club being dismissed for 0 all out with 10 separate batsmen being dismissed for a Duck. The Club is affiliated with:

- The ECB and is a Clubmark accredited club
- The Warwickshire Cricket Board, and runs three senior men's teams on a Saturday within the Warwickshire Cricket League and various junior teams in the Warwickshire Youth Cricket Leagues
- The Lichfield & District Cricket League, and runs two senior men's teams for these leagues on a Sunday

The village is located just near the Kingsbury Water Park country park hosting bridleways, cycle paths, footpaths, watersports, a rideable miniature railway and a Children's Farm. There are leisure facilities in the neighbouring village of Kingsbury, along with the Snowdome in Tamworth a little further afield. The village is just a few minutes drive from Drayton Manor Theme Park.

== Transport ==
Commuters may either use the M6 motorway links from this area east of Birmingham area in all directions, or the Coleshill Parkway railway station in the nearby town of Coleshill, 2 miles (3.2 km) west of Hoggrills End.
