= Kingsbury School, Warwickshire =

Kingsbury School

Location
- Tamworth Road; Tamworth, Staffordshire, B78 2LF; England; 52°33′59″N 1°41′00″W

Information
- Type: Academy
- Local authority: Warwickshire
- Department for Education URN: 141744 Tables
- Ofsted: Reports
- Headteacher: Martin Clarke
- Gender: Coeducational
- Age: 11 to 16
- Website: http://www.kingsburyschool.co.uk

Kingsbury School is a coeducational secondary school located in the village of Kingsbury, Warwickshire, England. Its main catchment area is Kingsbury, but students also attend from a number of neighbouring villages, such as Hurley and Whitacre Heath, Picadilly, Wood End, Bodymoor Heath and Middleton.

The school occupies a fairly central part of the village, and a school has existed in Kingsbury for over 300 years. The original school was established in 1686 by Thomas Coton. The present comprehensive school was built in 1956, and currently caters for around 610 students, whose ages range from 11 to 16. It is a specialist mathematics and science school. Following poor results in 2008 where the school was placed at the bottom of the Warwickshire league tables and significantly below national the school has undergone significant transformation. Under new leadership (and largely new staffing) A*-C results have improved to be significantly above the national average (67% A*-C including English and Maths 2013). The school received as a result an award for being in the top 40 of most improved schools (2010-2013). In 2015 Mr Simon Cotton the Headteacher at the time moved on with Mr Martin Clarke (Current Headteacher) taking over. The school has since achieved an Ofsted good rating and contributes to be one of the most successful schools in Warwickshire.

In addition, there is a swimming pool, which is open to the public during evenings, weekends and holidays. The pool, built in 1972 by Kingsbury Parish Council, has been managed by Warwickshire County Council since it was first opened. In February 2009 the future of the pool was placed in doubt after Warwickshire County Council announced their intention to withdraw funding at the end of the 2009/10 financial year. However, following a local campaign to save the pool, the Council agreed to continue funding for a further year while a plan for the long-term future of the pool is sought. As of 2020 the pool still remains in operation, being frequently used for P.E lessons despite its rather dire condition.

In 2011 the school took control of the pool and developed alongside a new sports hall in order to develop the site as a leisure centre. Since this time the newly founded KSA (Kingsbury Sports Academy Leisure Centre) has gained in popularity as a result of its highly thought of facilities.

Previously a community school administered by Warwickshire County Council, Kingsbury School converted to academy status in March 2015. However the school continues to coordinate with Warwickshire County Council for admissions.
