= Furnace End =

Hamlet in Warwickshire, England

Coordinates: 52°31′10″N 1°38′06″W

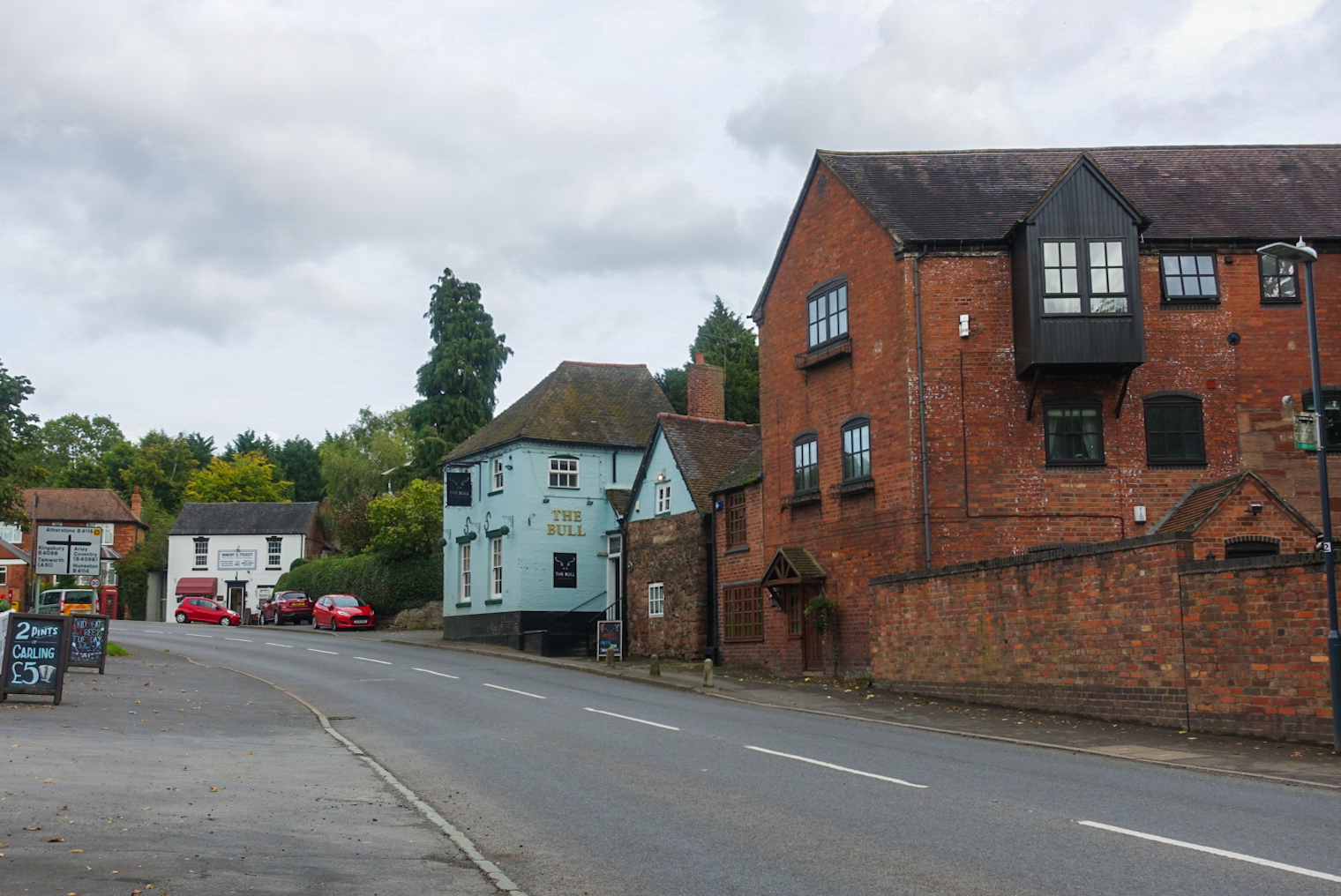
Furnace End, 29 September 2017

Furnace End is a large hamlet in the civil parish of Over Whitacre, and in the North Warwickshire district of Warwickshire, England. It is on the B4114 where the road intersects with the B4098 approximately midway between the market towns of Coleshill and Atherstone. The hamlet is believed to have acquired its name because of the iron smelting furnaces located there, which were owned by the Jennens family of nearby Nether Whitacre. Population statistics are part of Over Whitacre parish. Nearby settlements include Whitacre Heath, Shustoke, Kingsbury and Fillongley.
