= Warwickshire coalfield =

Coalfield in Warwickshire, England

The Warwickshire coalfield extends between Warwick and Tamworth in the English Midlands. It is about 25 miles (40 km) from north to south and its width is around half that distance. Its western margin is defined by the 'Western Boundary Fault'. In the northeast it abuts against steeply dipping shales of Cambrian age. The larger part of the outcrop at the surface consists of the Warwickshire Group of largely coal-barren red beds. Until its closure in 2013, the Daw Mill mine near Arley within the coalfield, was Britain's biggest coal-producer in the 21st century.

== Principal seams ==
The principal coal seams within the productive Lower and Middle Coal Measures include (in stratigraphic order i.e. youngest/uppermost first):

=== Middle Coal Measures ===
- Half Yard
- Four Feet
- Thin Rider
- Two Yard
- Bare
- Ryder
- Ell
- Nine Feet
- High Main
- Smithy (Low Main)

=== Lower Coal Measures ===
- Thin
- Seven Feet
- Trencher
- Yard
- Deep Rider
- Double
- Upper Bench (or Top Bench)
- Bench Thin
- Lower Bench
- Stumpy
- Stanhope

The Two Yard, Thin Rider, Ryder, Ell, Nine Feet, and High Main merge as one massive bed of coal known as the Thick Coal in parts of the coalfield.

== Collieries ==
Collieries mining in the Warwickshire Coalfield were:

- Alexandra Colliery
- Alvecote Colliery
- Amington Colliery
- Ansley Hall Colliery
- Arley Colliery
- Baddesley Colliery, closed 1989
- Binley Colliery
- Birch Coppice Colliery, closed 1989
- Coventry Colliery, also known as Keresley Colliery, closed 1991
- Craven Colliery
- Daw Mill Colliery
- Dexter Colliery
- Exhall Colliery
- Griff No 4 Colliery
- Griff Clara Colliery
- Haunchwood Colliery
- Hawkesbury Colliery
- Kingsbury Colliery
- Newdigate Colliery, closed in 1982
- North Warwickshire Colliery (formerly Pooley)
- Stockingford Colliery
- Wyken Colliery

== See also ==
- Warwickshire Miners' Association charity
