= St Francis of Assisi, Bedworth =

St. Francis of Assisi Roman Catholic Church
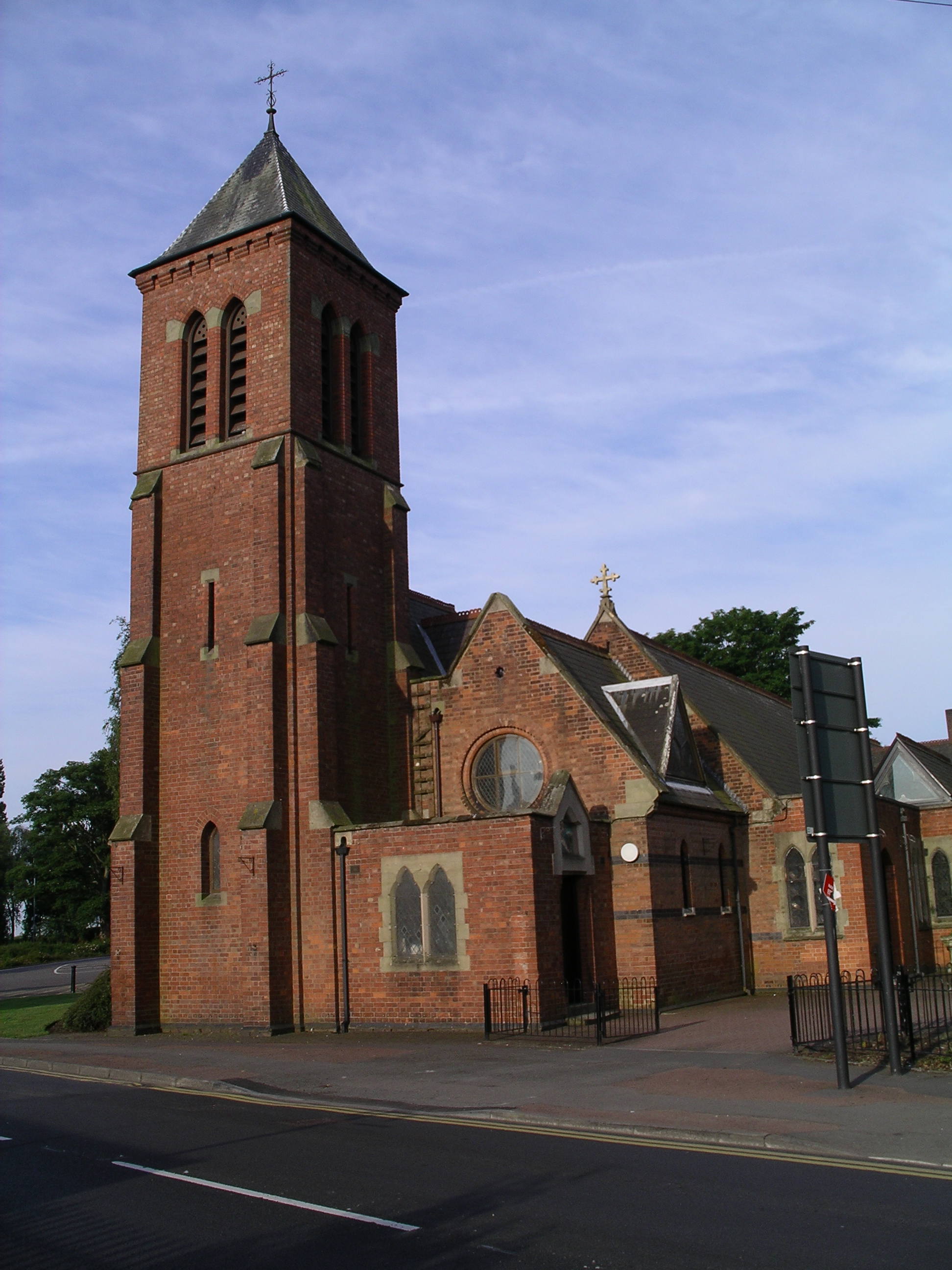
- St. Francis of Assisi Roman Catholic Church
- 52.47868°N 1.47015°W
- OS grid reference: SP 36096 86882
- Location: Rye Piece Ringway, Bedworth, Warwickshire
- Country: England
- Denomination: Roman Catholic
- Website: www.sfaolsh.org.uk

History
- Dedication: Saint Francis of Assisi
- Dedicated: 1883

Administration
- Archdiocese: Birmingham
- Deanery: Rugby
- Parish: Bedworth

Clergy
- Archbishop: Bernard Longley
- Bishop: William Kenney C.P.
- Priest(s): Rev. Fr. Michael Gamble (Parish Priest & Dean)

The Roman Catholic Parish Church of Saint Francis of Assisi is located in Bedworth, Warwickshire, England. The parish is part of the Roman Catholic Archdiocese of Birmingham and a part of the Rugby Deanery. The current Parish Priest is Fr. Michael Gamble. The parish is jointly administered with the neighbouring parish of Our Lady of the Sacred Heart, Bulkington (whilst still remaining technically separate). Working alongside the diocesan clergy are a group of Sisters of Providence of Saint Mary-of-the-Woods.

== Brief history ==
The church was originally opened in June 1883. Casting a tentative shadow over Rye Piece, (a little side-street in the middle of the town), it was built at a time when Catholics were, unfortunately, still viewed with suspicion. It was a modest, oblong structure built in traditional Victorian redbrick with a small schoolroom running along the west side.

The money to build it was raised by the priest, Fr Pius, not entirely from his sparse congregation but by simply begging all over the country. Funds for further development were supplemented by two long-running novenas dedicated to St Peter of Alcantara and St Francis Xavier.

In 1894 a school was built close to the church. Originally big enough to accommodate some 150 pupils aged from 4 to 14 years, eventually it was superseded by a new school. It is now a nursery.

The church itself was extended finally into its present form to be consecrated on 4 September 1923 and one of the hundreds of Catholic churches built following the Roman Catholic Relief Act 1829. A memorial to all the dedicated priests and parishioners of the past, particularly Fr Francis (1892 – 1912). He was a legend in his own lifetime whose French background undoubtedly influenced the unique character of the church. He acquired land around the church to build the new school, the presbytery, to build social housing and he bought an old brewery to serve as a social club. So the Catholic community which had first congregated in a disused shop in one of Bedworth's many yards, then a small chapel, finally had its own church, yet with the sanctuary at the west end and opposite to the original.

== Schools ==
- St Francis of Assisi Roman Catholic Primary School (feeds into St. Thomas More Catholic School, in the neighbouring parish of Our Lady of the Angels, Nuneaton).
