= Hurley, England =

Hurley, England may refer to:

- Hurley, Berkshire
- Hurley, Warwickshire
