= Old Arley =

Village in Warwickshire, England

Coordinates: 52.513°N 1.584°W

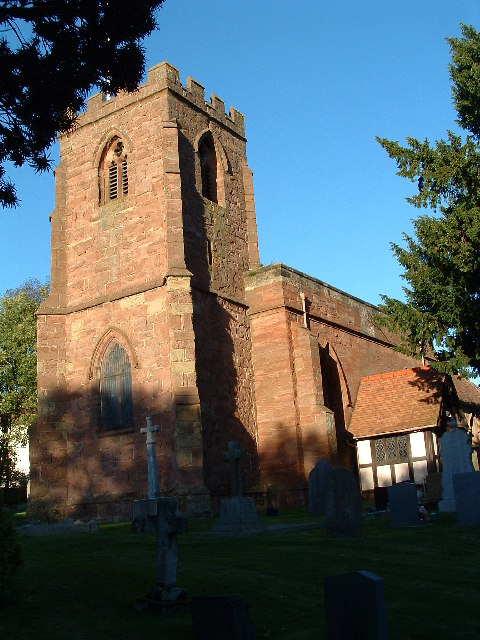
- Saint Wilfrid Parish Church

- Location within Warwickshire
- Population: 2,853 (2011 census)
- OS grid reference: SP2890
- District: North Warwickshire
- Shire county: Warwickshire
- Region: West Midlands
- Country: England
- Sovereign state: United Kingdom
- Post town: Nuneaton
- Police: Warwickshire
- Fire: Warwickshire
- Ambulance: West Midlands

Old Arley is a village in the civil parish of Arley, in the north of Warwickshire, England, 5.5 miles (8.9 km) west of Nuneaton and 10 miles (16 km) north west of the city of Coventry.

== Location ==
The village is within the civil parish of Arley in the North Warwickshire district of Warwickshire of which it is the less populated settlement. It is to the west of the stream called Bourne Brook and the Birmingham to Peterborough Line. The other settlement within the parish is New Arley which is southeast. Elevations of developed estates range from a maximum of 153 to 155 m (502 to 509 ft) Above Ordnance Datum in the Devitts Green western part of the village, gently down to 112 m (367 ft) at the southernmost neighbourhood, which adjoins the brook itself, which by the time it reaches the western tip of the parish at the defunct Daw Mill colliery, is at 92 m (302 ft) AOD. The locality of New Arley known as Hill Top is higher still at 166 m (545 ft), the highest point of the parish.

== Closest towns and transport ==
The village and parish is 10.5 miles (16.9 km) north west of the city of Coventry, and 6.8 miles (10.9 km) west of the town of Nuneaton but with equally good connections to Coleshill and to Birmingham, particularly its airport/NEC area. The nearest railway station is at Atherstone which is 4.8 miles (7.7 km) north east of the village. The B4114 runs along gentle hillsides east–west to the north of the village and travels west 4 miles (6.4 km) to meet the motorway network by the village of Coleshill on the nearside of Spaghetti Junction providing there a direct route over that junction to Birmingham or a short stretch (of the A446 road) south to Junction 4 of the M6 for longer distance journeys.

== History ==
Old Arley is included in the Domesday Book which was compiled in 1086. In its entry there the village, which is named as Arei, has four households, 2 men's plough teams, Woodland of 1.5 by 1 leagues. In 1066 the lord of the manor was Earl Edwin, and in 1086 the manor was Princess Christina who was also listed as the Tenant-in-chief. The parish had a taxable value of 1 gold unit per year. The village and parish was foremost a farming community and had several hamlets within its parish which combined slowly into the village of Old Arley: Gun Hill, Slowley Hill, Devitt's Green and Ballard's Green. The village was centred on the gothic, stone-built parish church of St Wilfrid. Samuel Lewis described the village in 1848:

ARLEY (St. Wilfrid), a parish, in the union of Nuneaton...hundred of Knightlow, Warwickshire, 8 miles (N. N. W.) from Coventry; containing 265 inhabitants. The parish is traversed by the road from Coventry to Tamworth, and comprises 1929a. 29p. of land, the greater portion of which is pasture and meadow; 140 acres are wood, and 20 common land. The soil is variable, some parts good, and some stiff clay; the surface is undulated, and the scenery picturesque. Lime in considerable quantities, and stone for the roads, are obtained here. The chief proprietor is Alfred Ashley Vaughton, Esq., of Fillongley Lodge. The benefice is a rectory, valued in the king's books at £9. 0. 7½.; patron and incumbent, the Rev. R. R. Vaughton: the tithes have been commuted for £336. 8., and the glebe consists of 74 acres. The church is an ancient edifice, with a square tower. £20 yearly out of lands producing upwards of £200 per annum, left by William Avery, and a donation of the interest of £600 in the new three-and-a-half per cents, by John and Francis Holmes, go towards the support of a free school. A Sunday school is supported by the rector.

In 1881 the population of the village was 207 and by 1891 it had risen to 216. In 1900 the Kelly's Directory includes a post office, with a post box built into the wall, which was said to be by the church. There was also a mixed free school which had been opened in 1875 for an attendance of a capacity of sixty, but had only an average attendance of thirty-three pupils. There was also a railway station with station master Alfred Lingdon. Kelly's also lists a total of twenty farms, one water mill and one public house, the Wagon Load of Lime. There was also one shop. The parish church of Old Arley is called Saint Wilfred and there is a Methodist church in the village.
