= Arley, Warwickshire =

Civil parish in Warwickshire, England

Coordinates: 52.513°N 1.584°W

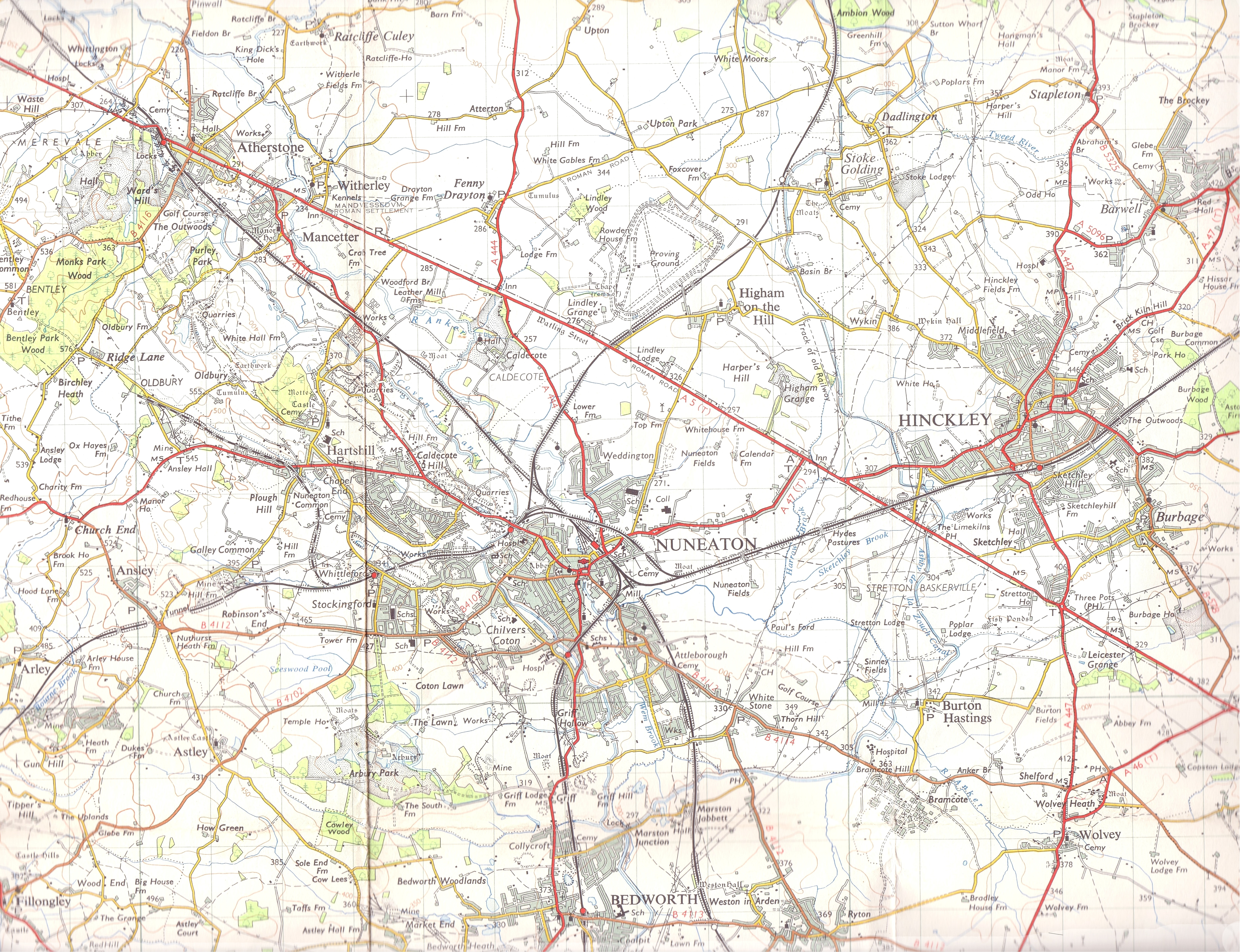
A 1961 1 inch = 1 mile series map, covering Hinckley, Nuneaton, part of Bedworth, Atherstone, Ansley, Burton Hastings, Hartshill and Wolvey

Arley is a civil parish in the North Warwickshire district of Warwickshire, England. The parish includes two settlements, New Arley and Old Arley. Old Arley is to the west of the Bourne Brook and the Birmingham to Peterborough Line, and New Arley is to the east. Nearby places are Ansley and Astley. Old Arley contains the medieval church of St Wilfred's, and a nearby Methodist church. New Arley contains St Michael's Church of England and St Joseph's Catholic Church. The two Anglican churches form one ecclesiastical parish, and St Joseph's is run from St Anne's.

== Collieries ==
=== Arley Colliery ===
Arley's mining industry ended in 1968. The village once had an eponymous colliery running beneath part of its central area which employed 1,734 men when it was finally closed on 30 March 1968, by the National Coal Board. It had then been in operation for sixty-six years and had once been owned and operated by the Arley Colliery Company Ltd. Production began at the pit on 1 January 1901 and the first coal was extracted from the mine in 1902. The mine was considered no longer economically viable by the NCB led by Lord Robens, officially of the Labour Party, in 1968, due to its relatively high costs and despite the cited fact that one hundred years of coal remained beneath. As production increased the colliery expanded and with this the population within the parish increased. This led to a need for new housing in the area. Between 1920 and 1955 six hundred houses were built on land which had been the Fir Tree Farm, this became New Arley.

=== Daw Mill, Kingsbury and Dexter Collieries ===
The two shafts that served Daw Mill were first sunk between 1956 and 1959, and 1969 and 1971 respectively. Daw Mill was a natural extension of the former collieries, Kingsbury Colliery and Dexter Colliery. On 7 March 2013 the owner, UK Coal, announced the Daw Mill mine towards the edge of the parish would be closed following a major fire - it was the last remaining colliery in the West Midlands.

== Demography ==
The usual number of residents in the civil parish which includes the slightly larger village of New Arley, was 2,853.

=== Industries of Work ===
The working population worked as set out below in the official industry categorisations in 2011:

Sector	% in Arley	Midlands	UK
A Agriculture, Forestry and Fishing	0.9%	0.9%	0.8%
B Mining and Quarrying	1.1%	0.1%	0.2%
C Manufacturing	11.3%	12.3%	8.8%
C10-1Manufacturing; Food, Beverages and Tobacco	0.8%	1.4%	1.2%
C13-15 Manufacturing; Textiles, Wearing Apparel and Leather and Related Products	0.3%	0.4%	0.4%
C16,17 Manufacturing; Wood, Paper and Paper Products	0.2%	0.3%	0.3%
C19-2Manufacturing; Chemicals, Chemical Products, Rubber and Plastic	0.4%	1.1%	1.1%
C23-25 Manufacturing; Low Tech	2.2%	2.9%	1.5%
C26-30 Manufacturing; High Tech	6.4%	4.0%	2.3%
C18, 31, 3Manufacturing; Other	1.1%	2.3%	2.1%
D Electricity, Gas, Steam and Air Conditioning Supply	0.8%	0.7%	0.6%
E Water Supply; Sewerage, Waste Management and Remediation Activities	0.8%	0.8%	0.7%
F Construction	6.8%	7.5%	7.7%
G Wholesale and Retail Trade; Repair of Motor Vehicles and Motor Cycles	14.1%	17.1%	15.9%
H Transport and Storage	6.4%	5.2%	5.0%
I Accommodation and Food Service Activities	5.3%	5.2%	5.6%
J Information and Communication	2.6%	2.9%	4.1%
K Financial and Insurance Activities	2.3%	3.1%	4.4%
L Real Estate Activities	1.3%	1.4%	1.5%
M Professional, Scientific and Technical Activities	4.3%	5.1%	6.7%
N Administrative and Support Service Activities	4.9%	4.7%	4.9%
O Public Administration and Defence; Compulsory Social Security	3.6%	5.3%	5.9%
P Education	9.1%	10.2%	9.9%
Q Human Health and Social Work Activities	9.5%	12.9%	12.4%
R,S Arts, Entertainment and Recreation; Other Service Activities	3.6%	4.5%	4.8%

=== Nationality ===
The ward is relatively representative of the nation as a whole in terms of national identity: Those who replied that there were no people in the household with English as their main language formed a proportion of the population 3.6% lower than the national average.

Percentage of Usual Residents who stated in 2011 they had a non-British identity only
in Arley	North Warwickshire	Midlands	England
1.5	1.6	6.2	8.3

=== Economic Status ===
The proportions of those retired, unemployed and who were students in 2011 were extremely close to the national averages, with a slightly higher degree of the retired and lower degree of students, whereas those in the economically inactive (other) category were fewer: (Note: 0.76% compared to 4.4% nationally)

Category	Arley	North Warwickshire	Midlands	England
Retired	14.5	15.5	14.4	13.7
Unemployed	4.5	3.6	5.1	4.4
Full-time Student	2.0	2.3	3.3	3.4
Economically inactive: other	1.7	1.5	2.4	2.2
Economically inactive: looking after home or family	4.4	3.3	4.6	4.4

=== Religion ===
Category	% in Arley	Midlands	England
Christian	64.5	60.2	49.4
None	25.9	22.0	24.7
Not Stated	8.4	6.6	7.2
Other	0.49	0.5	0.4
Hindu	0.32	1.3	1.5
Buddhist	0.08	0.3	0.5
Sikh	0.32	2.4	0.8
Muslim	0.04	6.7	5.0
Jewish	0	0.1	0.5
