= Piccadilly, Warwickshire =

Village in Warwickshire, England

Coordinates: 52.579°N 1.665°W

Piccadilly
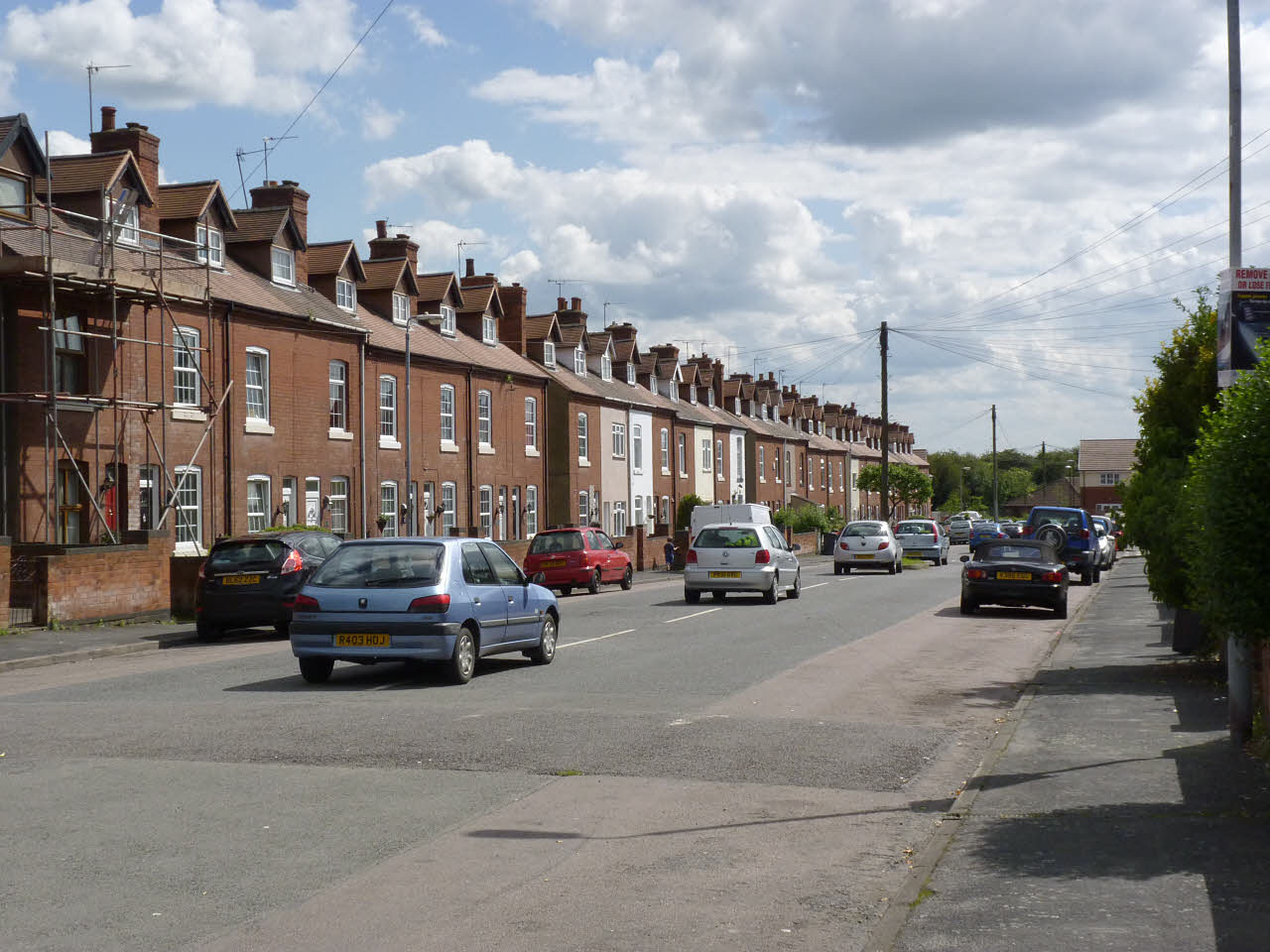
- Piccadilly

- Location within Warwickshire
- OS grid reference: SP 228 979
- Civil parish: Kingsbury
- District: North Warwickshire
- Shire county: Warwickshire
- Region: West Midlands
- Country: England
- Sovereign state: United Kingdom
- Post town: Tamworth
- Postcode district: B78
- Dialling code: 01827
- Police: Warwickshire
- Fire: Warwickshire
- Ambulance: West Midlands
- UK Parliament: North Warwickshire

Piccadilly is a small village in the North Warwickshire district of the county of Warwickshire in England. It is located near to the larger village of Kingsbury (where population details are included), and is four miles south of Tamworth.

== History ==
Piccadilly was built in 1904 to house miners who worked at the nearby Kingsbury Colliery, and the village was built on land belonging to the mine. It consisted of two rows of three-storey houses along one main street.

Piccadilly earned its name from Piccadilly in London, which was the home of Colonel Dibley, one of the village's founders. Dibley asked the miners what they would like to call their new village, but when nobody could think of an appropriate name, he chose Piccadilly.

In 1908 a clubhouse was built. It had been turned into a pub named The Jewel in the Crown but this has now been demolished and social housing built.

The village remained much the same until 1947 when prefabricated housing was built to house more mineworkers. These were demolished in the early 1960s after which the local authority of the time, Tamworth Rural District Council, used the land to build council houses. These remain to the present day.

== Demographics ==
According to the 2001 Census the population of the Hurley and Wood End ward was 3,642. Over 99.5% of people (3,550) describe themselves as White British with only 89 people from other ethnic groups. The most common distance travelled to work is 5–10 kilometres (3.1–6.2 mi), which is essentially to Tamworth, with the most common form of employment being manufacturing. The Ward almost has an almost exact 50:50 split of males and females, with a ratio of 1,822 to 1,820 respectively. According to Kingsbury Parish Council there are 142 houses in the village.

== Governance ==
The village is part of the Kingsbury civil parish.

The village was originally part of the Tamworth Rural District from its creation, until 1965 when it became part of the Atherstone Rural District. In 1974 under the Local Government Act 1972 it became part of the newly formed district of North Warwickshire. Inside North Warwickshire it is part of the Hurley and Wood End Ward, and because of the mining connection the village often elects Labour councillors.

It is part of the North Warwickshire constituency and the current MP is Labour Rachel Taylor.
