= Thomas Coton =

(1640-1688) English philanthropist and sheriff

Thomas Coton (1640-1688) was a philanthropist who endowed in his will one of the first poor schools in the village of Kingsbury, Warwickshire. Thomas Coton was appointed the High Sheriff of Warwickshire in November 1676.

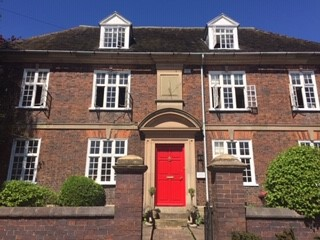
Thomas Coton's original school.

In 1686, a school was founded in his name. In his will, Thomas Coton had set aside land as an income for rent in a trust, to pay for the upkeep of the building, teachers and school equipment, including bibles. This act ensured that education in the village continued as a trust well into the 1800s and was documented in the Parliamentary review of trusts in 1835.

The original school is now a Grade II listed building and education in the village takes place at Kingsbury School, Warwickshire.

In August 2017, Thomas Coton was recognised through the unveiling of a plaque by Craig Tracey, MP for North Warwickshire and Lisa Pinney MBE, Head of the Environment Agency for the West Midlands. The plaque is located at the footings of Coton Hall, Cotonbridge, the original residence of Thomas Coton. The footings of the Hall had been discovered in 2016 by Bradley Stevens, a student at Kingsbury School, Warwickshire, following his research into old maps of the Cotonbridge area from the 1850s. The history of the school, Thomas Coton and Coton Hall was documented in a video in 2018. In 2023, a blue plaque to Coton was unveiled by Tracey on behalf of the Tamworth Heritage Trust at the original school building, now known as Teachers House.
