= Rugby Deanery =

The Rugby Deanery is a Roman Catholic Deanery in the Roman Catholic Archdiocese of Birmingham. Comprising eight parishes (10 churches) in north and mid-Warwickshire, it is part of the Southern pastoral area.

== Key personnel ==
As of 2015, the area bishop is the Rt Rev William Kenney and the area dean is Fr. Michael Gamble.

== Parishes ==
Parish	Parish Priest
Our Lady of the Sacred Heart, Bulkington	Fr. Michael Gamble
English Martyrs, Hilmorton, Rugby (incorporating St. Joseph's, Monks Kirby)	Fr. Gerard Murray
Our Lady of the Angels, Nuneaton	Fr. Simon Hall
Sacred Heart, Rugby	Fr. Gerard Murray
St Anne's, Chapel End, Nuneaton (incorporating St. Joseph's, Arley)	Fr. George Waraich
St. Benedict's, Atherstone	Mgr. Paul Watson
St Francis of Assisi, Bedworth	Fr. Michael Gamble
St. Marie's, Rugby	Fr. Tom Thomas IC
