= River Bourne, Warwickshire =

River in Warwickshire, England

River Bourne
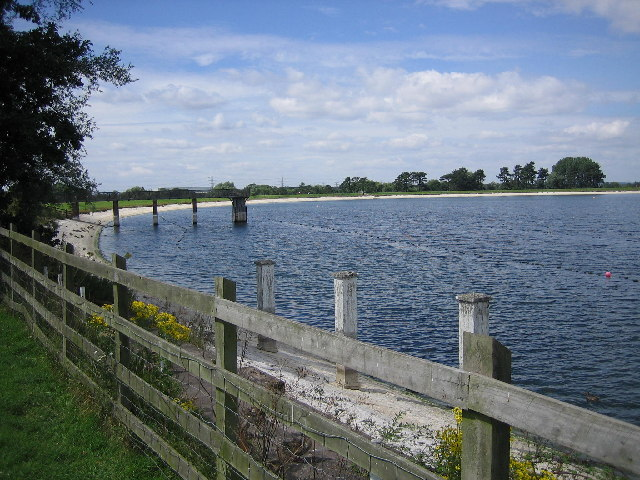
- Shustoke Reservoir is supplied by the Bourne

Location
- Country: England
- Counties: Warwickshire

Physical characteristics
- Mouth
  - location: Warwickshire
  - coordinates: 52.5217°N 1.6834°W
- Length: 17.6 km (10.9 mi)
- Basin size: 47 km^{2} (18 sq mi)

Basin features
- Tributaries
  - left: Didgley Brook
  - right: Whitacre Brook

The River Bourne flows for 10.9 miles (17.6 km) through North Warwickshire, England, and is a tributary of the River Tame. In the 19th century, the river with its undeveloped catchment close to Birmingham, was selected to provide a source of clean drinking water for the city.

== Course ==
The river rises between Ansley Common and Birchley Heath, to the south west of Atherstone where it is shown in maps as the Bourne brook. It then flows in a south-westerly direction past Church End to Ansley Mill where it is forded by a minor road. It continues in the same direction passing between New and Old Arley to join the Didgley brook which drains the area around Fillongley. Downstream of this confluence, the brook becomes the River Bourne; it is crossed by the Tamworth road, and turns in a north westerly direction, to flow past Slowley Hall, and the former location of Daw Mill Colliery. The river continues to Furnace End, where it is joined by the Whitacre Brook, and turns to flow in a westerly direction alongside Shustoke reservoir, beyond which it joins the River Tame downstream of the River Blythe confluence. The Tame then joins the River Trent, whose waters reach the North Sea via the Humber Estuary.

The drainage basin for the Bourne lies between that of the River Blythe to the south and west, with the River Anker to the north and east, and it has a catchment area of 47 square kilometres (18 mi^{2}).

== Water supply ==
Raw water is taken from the river for storage in the Shustoke reservoirs. The main reservoir is used to supply drinking water to various parts of Warwickshire, including Atherstone and Bedworth.

== Ecology ==
The various streams in the River Bourne catchment have all been classed at the lower end of the scale in terms of ecological quality under the Water Framework Directive. The upper Bourne has been ranked as bad, Didgley brook as moderate and the lower Bourne as poor. The five part framework scale, ranges from high, good, and moderate, through to poor and finally bad.

== Bibliography ==
- National Rivers Authority (1994). Blythe/Cole/Bourne Catchment Management Plan. National Rivers Authority Severn-Trent Region.
