= Blythe End =

Hamlet in Warwickshire, England

Coordinates: 52.512°N 1.686°W

Blythe End is a hamlet in the North Warwickshire district of Warwickshire, England. Blythe End is halfway between Coleshill (where the population details can be found) and Shustoke on the B4114 road (the former A47 Birmingham to Nuneaton road). There are a few houses, an old mill and a water works. The most famous building is Blyth Hall, built by Sir William Dugdale in the 17th century, but with 18th-century additions. It is still the family home. Sir William Dugdale was born at Shustoke. He recorded the nearby Blythe Bridge, which carries the road over the River Blythe, as dating from 1439.
