= Our Lady of the Angels, Nuneaton =

Our Lady of the Angels Roman Catholic Church
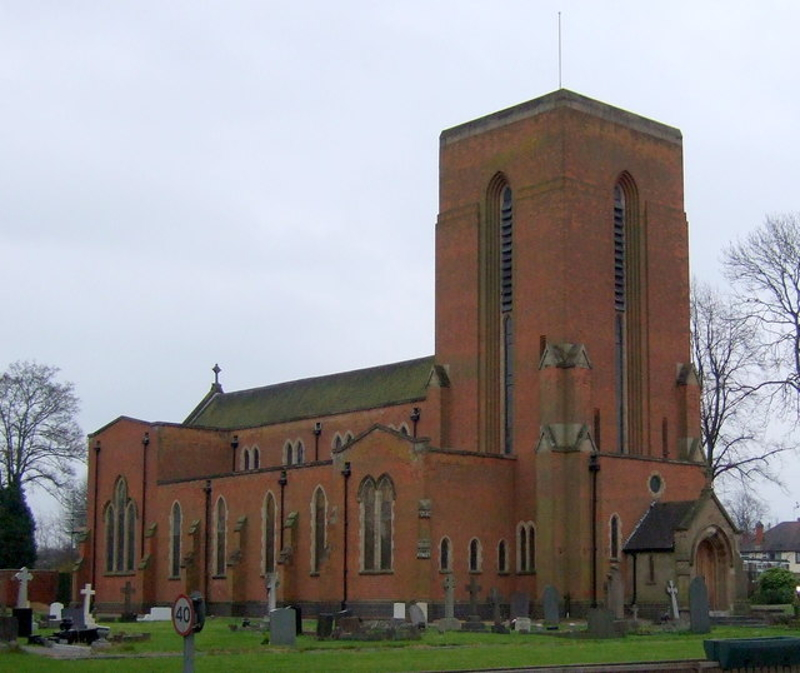
- Our Lady of the Angels Roman Catholic Church
- 52.51735°N 1.46657°W
- OS grid reference: SP 36291 91182
- Location: Coton Road, Nuneaton, Warwickshire
- Country: England
- Denomination: Roman Catholic
- Website: www.ourladyoftheangelsnuneaton.com

History
- Former name: St.Mary's (1837-1889) (current name since 1889)
- Dedication: Blessed Virgin Mary, Our Lady of the Angels
- Dedicated: 1838

Architecture
- Architect: Joseph Hansom

Administration
- Archdiocese: Birmingham
- Deanery: Coventry and Nuneaton
- Parish: Nuneaton

Clergy
- Archbishop: Bernard Longley
- Bishop: William Kenney C.P.
- Priest: Rev. Fr. Jimmy Lutwama AJ

The Roman Catholic Parish of Our Lady of the Angels is located in Nuneaton, Warwickshire, England. The parish is part of the Roman Catholic Archdiocese of Birmingham and a part of the Rugby Deanery. The current Parish Priest is Fr. Jimmy Lutwama. Working alongside the diocesan clergy are a group of Presentation Sisters.

It is one of two parishes serving the town, the other being St. Anne's. Originally, it was the Parish Church for the whole of the town, until 1948 when the aforementioned Parish of St. Anne's was created out of it. Today the Parish of Our Lady of the Angels covers Nuneaton town centre and the surrounding areas of Caldecote, Weddington, St. Nicolas Park, Horeston Grange, Whitestone, Attleborough, Chilvers Coton and Stockingford.

== History ==
=== St. Mary's ===
Following the Roman Catholic Relief Act 1829, the culmination of Catholic emancipation in Great Britain, there were various missions to the Catholic population in the country; including the Nuneaton area. Whilst Mass would have been said first at Leather Mill Farm, Caldecote, then at a cottage in Bond Street, a permanent church was required for the burgeoning Catholic population.

In 1837, a parcel of land was purchased in Coton Road, where the new church was to be built. St. Mary's was opened in 1838 (a year after the foundation stone was laid). The laity was first served by the Dominicans (until 1880) and then the Capuchin Fathers (until 1889).

=== Our Lady of the Angels ===
1889 was another key moment in the history of the parish. After nine years, the Capuchin Fathers moved to Olton Friary, Solihull. At this point, the church came fully under the control of the then Diocese of Birmingham (it was not elevated to an Archdiocese until 1911) and the diocesan clergy. Concurrently, the name of the church was changed to Our Lady of the Angels.

=== Parish Changes ===
In 1949, the geographical size of the parish was altered, when St. Anne's Parish church was built, as a result of the growing Catholic population in the town. 1960, a new "Mass centre", St. Bernadette's was built in Stockingford (again to address the growing Catholic population in Nuneaton). However, 1994 saw a "change in circumstance" (including a reduction of the number of priests serving the parish) sadly saw this popular church close, with Mass provision reverting to the 'mother church' of the parish (ie. Our Lady's).

== Schools within the parish ==
- Our Lady and Saint Joseph's Catholic Academy (Primary)
- St Thomas More Catholic School and Sixth Form College, Nuneaton (Secondary & post 16

Both schools are a part of the Holy Spirit Catholic Multi Academy
