= Sid Ireland =

English footballer (1886–1964)

Personal information
- Full name: Sidney Ireland
- Date of birth: 1886
- Place of birth: Coventry, England
- Date of death: 1964 (aged 77–78)
- Place of death: Coventry, England
- Height: 5 ft 8 in (1.73 m)
- Position: Left-back

Youth career
- Kingsbury Colliery

Senior career*
Years	Team	Apps	(Gls)
1911–1915	Southampton	120	(0)
1919–1920	Merthyr Town		
- * Club domestic league appearances and goals

Sidney Ireland (1886–1964) was an English professional footballer who played as a left-back, spending most of his career with Southampton.

== Football career ==
Ireland was born in Coventry and, after leaving school, worked as a coal-miner at nearby Kingsbury Colliery where he was spotted by scouts from Southampton, joining the Southern League club in the summer of 1911.

He made his "Saints" debut on 30 September 1911, taking the place of John Robertson in a 2–1 victory over Northampton Town. Although he also played in the following match, a 5–0 defeat by Brighton, Ireland spent the rest of the season in the reserves until returning to the first-team on 23 March 1912 in place of Robertson (who had been sold to Rangers), with manager George Swift attempting to improve the performances of a side which had won only once in the previous ten games. Southampton defeated Luton Town and followed this with a victory over Plymouth Argyle and Ireland retained his place for the rest of the season which ended with the Saints three points above the relegation zone.

Ireland now made the left-back position his own and was ever-present in the 1912–13 season under new coach Jimmy McIntyre. Although Saints continued to struggle on the pitch, again finishing the season just above the relegation places, Ireland began to establish a reputation as "the best left-back in the Southern League". Missing only two matches in the following season, Ireland was rewarded by representing the Southern League against the Scottish and Irish Leagues.

In the 1914–15 season, when Ireland missed only three matches, Southampton began to show signs of improvement, finishing sixth in the table, before the First World War caused the suspension of normal football for four years.

During the war, Ireland guested for Manchester United as well as turning out occasionally for Southampton. He also played several representative matches for the Midlands against the Rest of England in 1916 and for an England XI later that same year. His military duties took him to the Western Front, where he was captured by the Germans in 1918, spending the remainder of the war in a prisoner-of-war camp.

Although he played for Southampton in a Victory Cup match against Boscombe in February 1919, Ireland moved on to join Merthyr Town in the summer of 1919 for their final season in the Southern League, in what the "Athletics News" described as "an outstanding capture". In 1920 he signed for Birmingham Combination side Rugby Town where he stayed for 8 seasons making a total of 170 league appearances.
