= Over Whitacre =

Village in Warwickshire, England

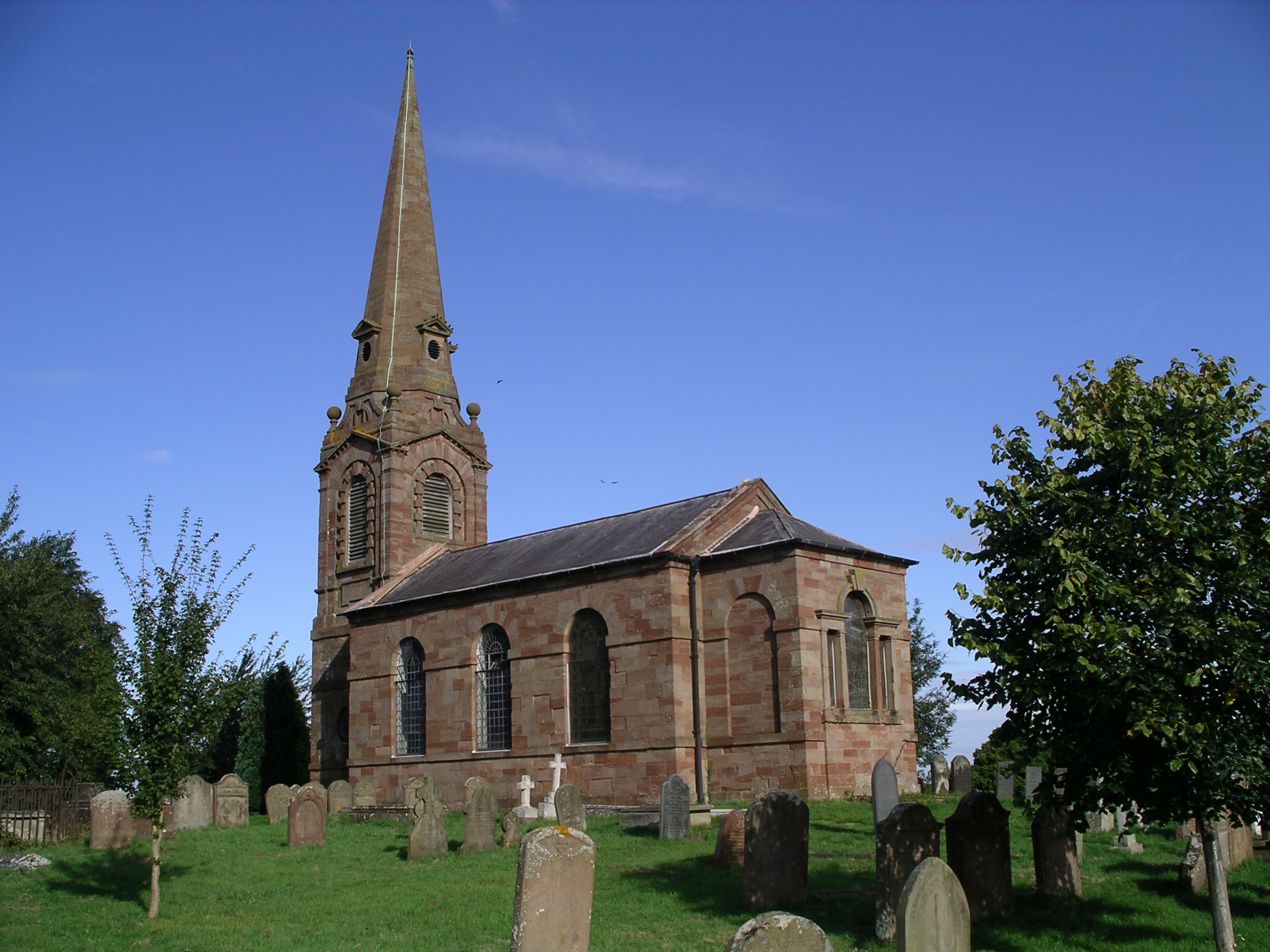
- St Leonard's Church in Over Whitacre

- Location within Warwickshire
- Coordinates: 52°31′00″N 1°37′35″W
- Country: United Kingdom
- County: Warwickshire
- District: North Warwickshire

Population (2021)
  - Total: 407

Over Whitacre is a village and civil parish containing the hamlets of Botts Green, Furnace End and Monwode Lea in North Warwickshire, Warwickshire, England. The population of the parish at the 2021 census was 407. It is located near other villages, Nether Whitacre and Whitacre Heath, although Whitacre heath is actually the heath of Nether Whitacre and not a separate parish. The nearby hamlet of Furnace End probably derives its name from iron smelting furnaces owned by the Jennens of Nether Whitacre. The village today is mainly residential and agricultural, but there is some light industry.

The village appears in the Domesday Book so it was already established in the Saxon period. However, objects belonging to much earlier Neolithic and Bronze Age times have been found in the soil. Whitacre was spelt then as 'Witecore' which means white field. The area has many stone-built buildings of the 17th and 18th centuries. The 18th-century parish church of St Leonards is situated on the main road between Coventry and Tamworth (the B4098 or old A47). It is of classical Italian style, built in 1766 on the site of an earlier foundation. Two of the oldest buildings in the parish are Barbers Farm, dating to 1586 and The Bothie at Botts Green.
