= Hurley Common =

Village in Warwickshire, England

Coordinates: 52.571°N 1.645°W

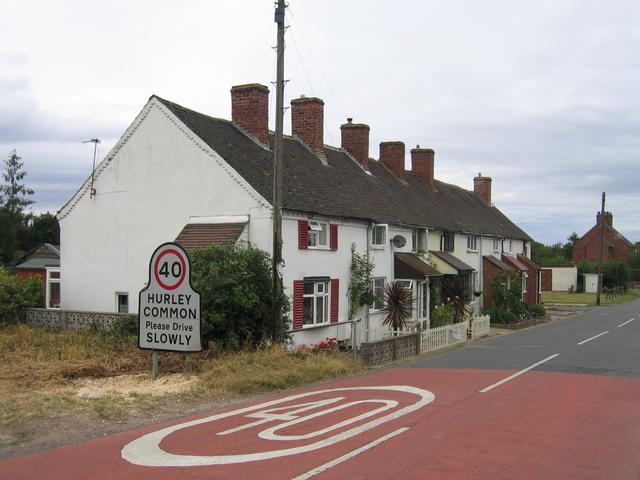
- Road into Hurley Common

- Location within Warwickshire
- OS grid reference: SP241970
- Civil parish: Kingsbury
- District: North Warwickshire
- Shire county: Warwickshire
- Region: West Midlands
- Country: England
- Sovereign state: United Kingdom
- Post town: Atherstone
- Postcode district: CV9
- Dialling code: 01827
- Police: Warwickshire
- Fire: Warwickshire
- Ambulance: West Midlands
- UK Parliament: North Warwickshire

Hurley Common is a village in North Warwickshire, England, between Wood End and Hurley, it consists of several houses and 2 Farms, Hurley common does not have its own Parish Church so it is technically a hamlet. Population details for the 2011 Census can be found under Kingsbury.

== History ==
Hurley Common dates from before the nearby village of Wood End which was built in 1890. The name suggests that it was originally the common land to the village of Hurley. During the early 20th century there were several mines in the area; all have now closed.

== Demographics ==
According to the 2001 Census the population of the Hurley and Wood End ward was 3,642. Over 99.5% of people (3,550) describe themselves as White British with only 89 people from other ethnic groups. The most common distance travelled to work is 5–10 kilometres (3.1–6.2 mi), which is essentially to Tamworth, with the most common form of employment being manufacturing. The Ward has an almost exact 50:50 split of males and females, with a ratio of 1,822 to 1,820 respectively. According to Kingsbury Parish Council there are "little more" than 50 people who live in the village.

== Governance ==
The village is part of the Kingsbury civil parish. The village was originally part of the Tamworth Rural District from its creation until 1965, when it became part of the Atherstone Rural District. In 1974 under the Local Government Act 1972 it became part of the newly formed district of North Warwickshire. Inside North Warwickshire it is part of the Hurley and Wood End Ward, and because of the mining connection the ward often elects Labour councillors. It is part of the North Warwickshire constituency.

== Religion ==
According to the 2001 census the Ward of Hurley and Wood End is 80% Christian, 19% Non-Religious and 1% Other.
