= Whitacre Pumping Station =

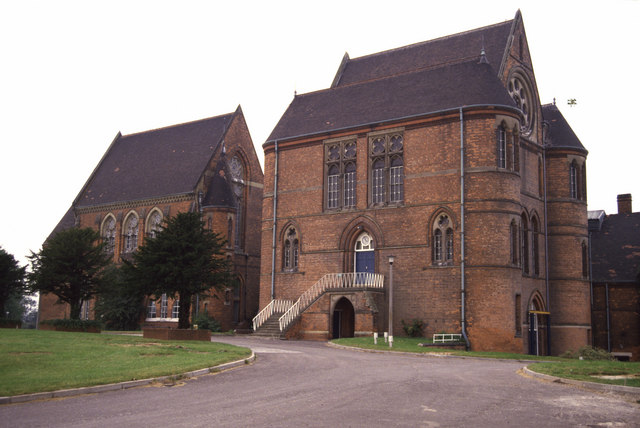
- Interactive map of Whitacre Pumping Station
- 52.518633°N 1.683207°W
- Location: Station Road, Shustoke, Warwickshire, England

History
- Built: c. 1872

Site notes
- Architect: Martin & Chamberlain
- Architectural style: Civic Gospel
- Owner: Severn Trent Water

Listed Building – Grade II*
- Official name: Waterworks at Whitacre: Pumping Station, Filter House, Water Well and Superintendent's Office
- Designated: 22 March 1982
- Reference no.: 1265889

The Whitacre Pumping Station, near Shustoke, Warwickshire, is a Victorian Civic Gospel pumping house built in circa 1872. Along with the construction of Shustoke Reservoir, it was originally designed to pump six million gallons of fresh water per day to nearby Birmingham. It started operating in 1883, but was shortly thereafter in 1904 put into standby as the Elan Valley reservoirs and aqueduct scheme started to supply Birmingham with its freshwater needs. It instead was latterly used in 1908 to supply water to Coventry, and now Nuneaton, Atherstone, and Bedworth. The water supply emanates from the nearby river Bourne and the river Blythe. The pumping station building was listed grade II* in March 1982 as a notable example of civic gospel. The listing also covers a Victorian filter house, water well, and Superintendent's house. In 2018 the unused building was placed on Historic England's Heritage at Risk Register due to its poor condition and prioritised as in immediate risk of further rapid deterioration.

The pumping station and reservoir originally belonged to the Water Department of the City of Birmingham, but now they are the responsibility of Severn Trent Water. The reservoir is a popular leisure site for sailing and walking.

Apart from the two clocks, the original pumping machinery and ancillaries have largely been dismantled and replaced with modern equipment. The site was largely extended in 1977 with new more modern works. It is believed to originally have contained two beam engines by James Watt, one of which is now on display in the Science Museum, Birmingham.

== Notable features ==
The pumping station house is predominantly constructed in red brick with stone dressings, the roofs are generally pitched and tiled in clay, and the eaves decorated with modillion eaves and cornices. The Southeastern part of the building is prominent, with a tall gabled central part with 6 windows in the gable and 3 large gothic windows below. It is flanked by aisled constructions with apsidal ends and with semi-conical roofs. The southwestern end is also prominent, again with large gabled roof, with a semi-circular extension with semi-conical roof on the western end, and a circular corner turret with conical roof on the east. The northern part of the building comprises a large uninterrupted wing, with a longitudinal pitched roof with glazed rooflight ventilators, and seven smaller gabled roofs at right-angles to the main roof. There are many large gothic windows within the various facades.
