= Shustoke =

Village in Warwickshire, England

Coordinates: 52.514863°N 1.66095°W

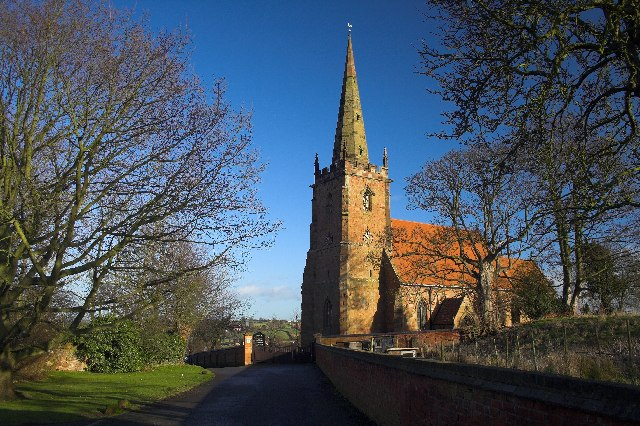
- Saint Cuthbert's Parish Church

- Location within Warwickshire
- Population: 538 (2021)
- OS grid reference: SP228908
- Civil parish: Shustoke
- District: North Warwickshire
- Shire county: Warwickshire
- Region: West Midlands
- Country: England
- Sovereign state: United Kingdom
- Post town: BIRMINGHAM
- Postcode district: B46
- Dialling code: 01675
- Police: Warwickshire
- Fire: Warwickshire
- Ambulance: West Midlands

Shustoke is a village in the North Warwickshire district of the county of Warwickshire in England. The population of the civil parish at the 2021 census was 538. It is situated 2.5 miles northeast of Coleshill (the nearest town), 7.5 miles southwest of Atherstone, 9.5 miles west of Nuneaton and 12.5 miles east-northeast of Birmingham. It includes the sub-village of Church End half-a-mile to the east, where the parish church of Saint Cuthbert's is situated.

== History ==
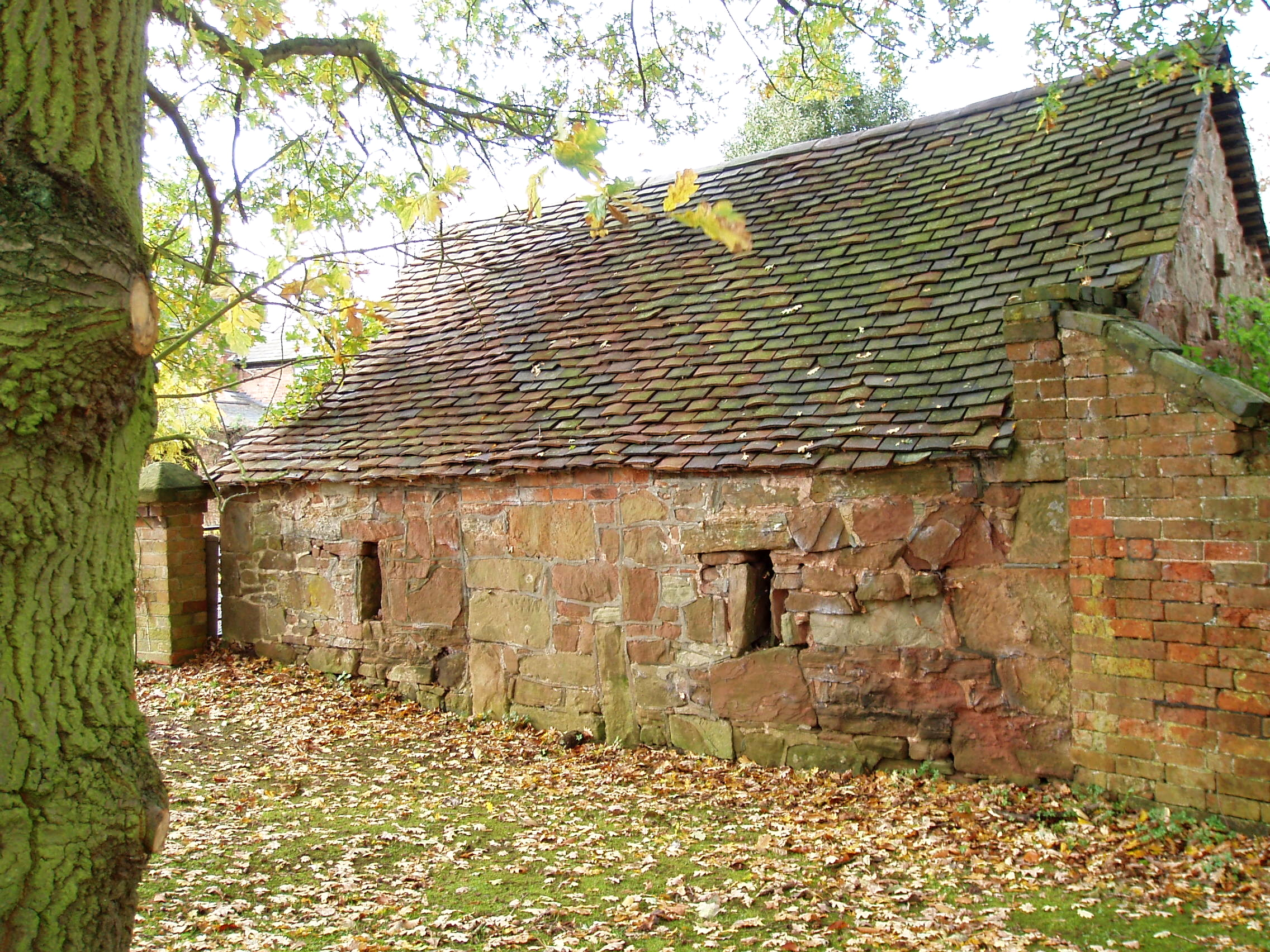
Old barn, made of typical Shustoke red sandstone.

Shustoke is an ancient village and it existed before the Domesday Book. In 1086 Shustoke was recorded as 'Scotescote' meaning Scots Cottage, as cote means cottage, dwelling or house. The parish church of St Cuthbert's was erected in 1307 on the site of an earlier church or chapel. Some remains of a Celtic-type churchyard cross and reused Norman masonry can be seen. The parish registers are some of the earliest in the country and date from the reign of Henry VIII. Some are in the handwriting of the scholar and antiquary Sir William Dugdale. Dugdale was born in the building now known as 'The Old Rectory' in Shawbury Lane on 12 September 1605, and is widely regarded as the county's first and greatest antiquarian.

He built and lived in Blyth Hall and was a strong royalist supporter of King Charles I during the Civil War, being appointed as his 'Garter Principal King of Arms'. On 10 May 1660 at Coleshill he read out the proclamation announcing that Charles' son Charles II was now the King of England. Dugdale's descendants later bought land near Atherstone (the site of the former Merevale Abbey) where they built Merevale Hall. Many of the artefacts of Sir William Dugdale can be seen here, including his ceremonial tabard as Garter Principal King of Arms clothes. During the English Civil War Shustoke is listed among the towns paying arrears to the garrison at Tamworth in an account drawn up by Captain Thomas Layfield for the period from 1 November 1645 to 1 May 1646.

At a weekly rate of £7.5 the total arrears amounted to £108.10. There are many interesting buildings in the parish. Some around the church are typical Arden timber-framing with brick in-fill, dating from the 17th century. Others are the Alms Houses, the moated Shustoke Hall, and a Tithe barn at the nearby hamlet of Church End. Joseph Harrison, the early seventeenth-century vicar of Shustoke, appears to have enjoyed some notoriety as a drunkard. The justices of the Warwick quarter sessions at Easter, 1635 record that the late vicar was "a man of very lewd condition, much subject to drunkenness" and ruled that William Bull, his father-in-law, was to be responsible for supporting his surviving wife and child.

== Reservoir ==
In the 1870s, the area around Shustoke, Nether Whitacre, and Whitacre Heath became important in the storage and distribution of drinking water. Shustoke Reservoir was constructed to store water from the River Bourne and at Whitacre a pumping station and further reservoir and treatment works were built. Total storage capacity is 460,000,000 gallons (2 mill ion cubic meters). These were originally the responsibility of the Birmingham Corporation Water Department, and were the city's main supply until the demands of the growing population led to the construction of newer larger reservoirs in mid-Wales. Since the completion of the Elan Valley scheme in 1904, the Shustoke reservoir has supplied demand from Coventry, Nuneaton and surrounding area. It is now operated by Severn Trent Water. The reservoir is a popular leisure site for sailing and walking.

== Village ==
The Griffin, a pub in Shustoke, was featured in the 2010 BBC programme Oz and Hugh Raise the Bar. During the series, Oz Clarke and Hugh Dennis travelled around the United Kingdom collecting the best British drinks before selling the drinks at The Griffin. It also lies on the Heart of England Way.
