= Bodymoor Heath =

Village in Warwickshire, England

Coordinates: 52.5641°N 1.7084°W

Kingsbury
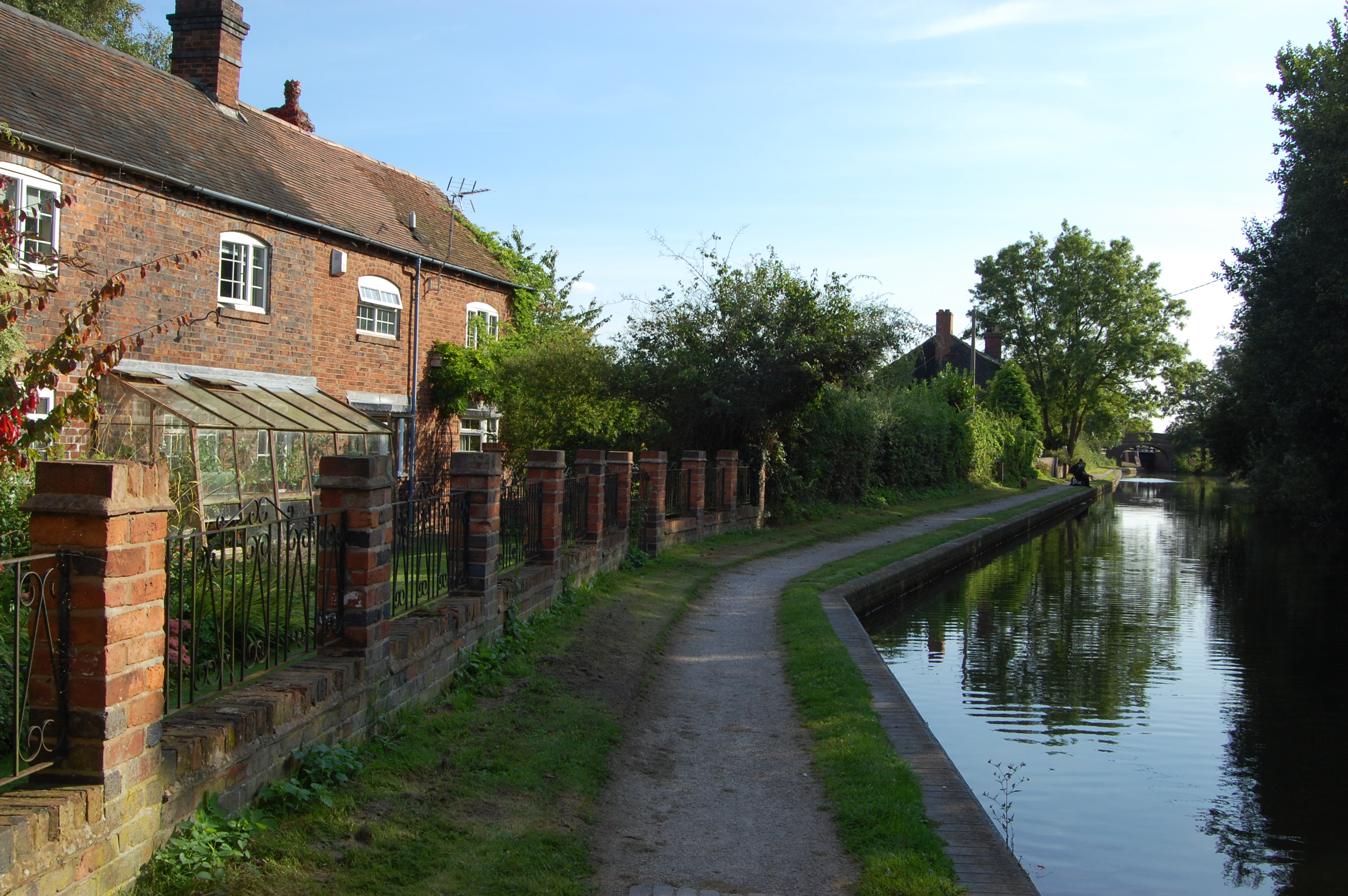
- Canal-side cottages at Bodymoor Heath, seen from below Bodymoor Heath Bridge

- Location within Warwickshire
- Civil parish: Kingsbury
- District: North Warwickshire
- Shire county: Warwickshire
- Region: West Midlands
- Country: England
- Sovereign state: United Kingdom
- Post town: SUTTON COLDFIELD
- Postcode district: B76
- Police: Warwickshire
- Fire: Warwickshire
- Ambulance: West Midlands
- UK Parliament: North Warwickshire

Bodymoor Heath is a small village in the North Warwickshire district of the county of Warwickshire in England, situated on, and with a bridge over, the Birmingham and Fazeley Canal close to the much larger village of Kingsbury.

== History ==
Bodymoor Heath was originally a separate village but later became inclosed as a part of the parish of Kingsbury. Bodymoor Heath was the centre of a High Court of Chancery case of Barker v. Barker where it was held that the husband of a daughter who had inherited her father's lands in Bodymoor Heath, was not entitled to any dividend just through curtesy. The village later came into the ownership of the twice Prime Minister, Sir Robert Peel along with the surrounding Kingsbury parish. The village is located near the planned route of the High Speed 2 railway line. The route passes through the Bodymoor Heath Training Ground, which necessitated Aston Villa to relocate a number of their facilities and pitches away from the planned route.

== Dog and Doublet Inn ==
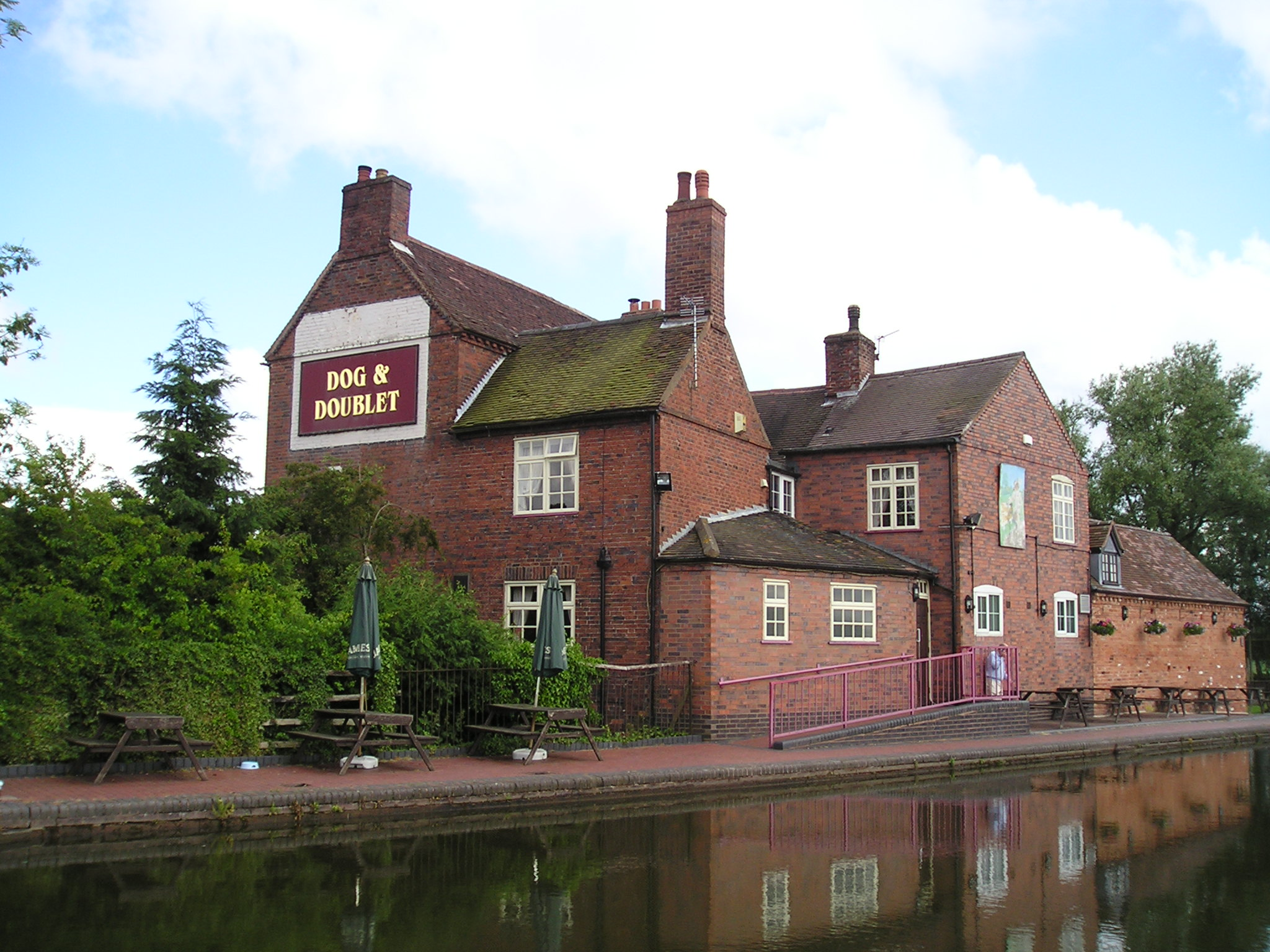
Dog and Doublet Inn on the Birmingham and Fazeley Canal

Bodymoor Heath has a pub. The pub is called the Dog and Doublet. It was constructed in 1786. Although some sources state it did not become a pub until 1835 it was trading in 1817.

The inn provided refreshments for the parishioners of Kingsbury at the end of their annual two-day walk Beating the Bounds procession, when they covered the boundary of the 8,000 acre parish.

The pub was granted grade II listed status in 1981 by English Heritage. It also has a grade II listed bridge.

== Aston Villa ==
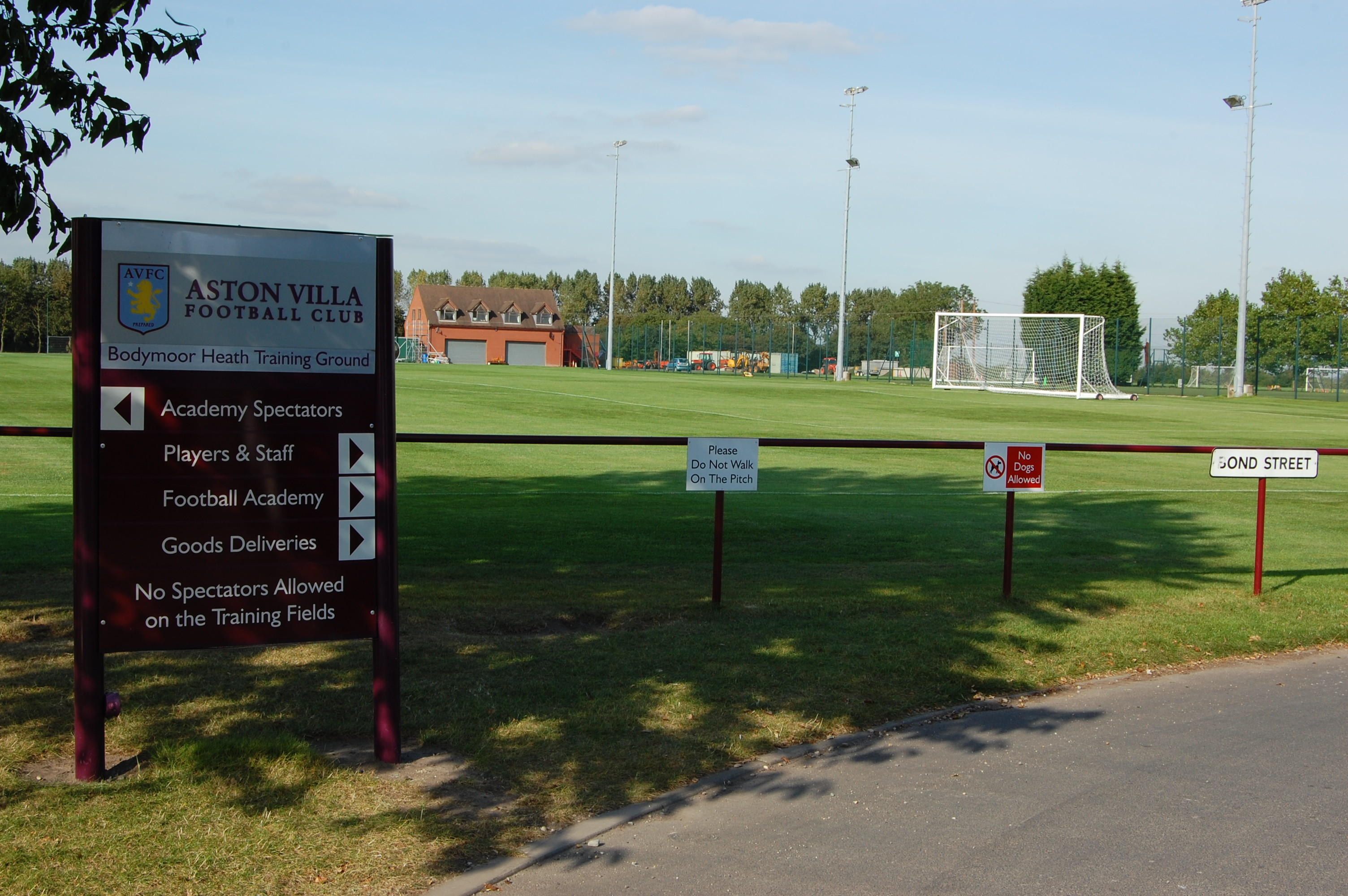
Aston Villa signage at Bodymoor Heath, seen in 2009. Note the tennis courts, behind the goalpost.

Bodymoor Heath is also the home of Aston Villa Football Club's Bodymoor Heath Training Ground. The land it was built on was purchased in the 1970s by Aston Villa's chairman Doug Ellis from a local farmer. It was redeveloped in the 1990s after criticism of under-investment by the Villa manager John Gregory.

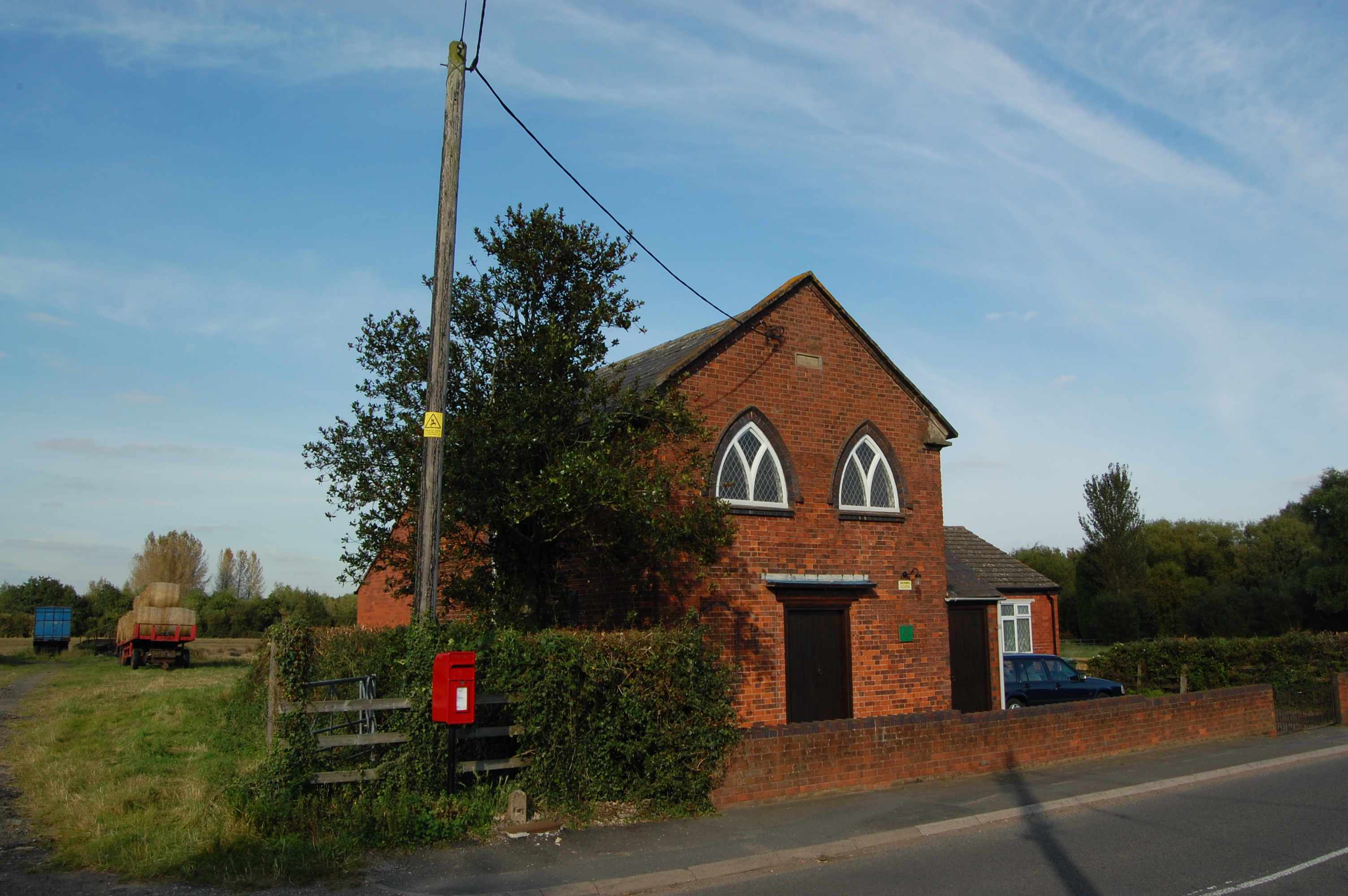
The Old Chapel (Wesleyan, dated 1844) at Bodymoor Heath
