= St Anne's, Chapel End, Nuneaton =

Church in Nuneaton

Coordinates: 52.536°N 1.510°W

The Roman Catholic parish of St Anne, Nuneaton, in Warwickshire, England, serves the western side of Nuneaton and outlying villages towards Coleshill. The parish is part of the Roman Catholic Archdiocese of Birmingham and a part of the Rugby Deanery. The current Parish Priest is Fr. George.

The church (rebuilt in 2000) is on Camp Hill Road, Nuneaton. The parish was formed in 1948 and includes St Joseph's Church in New Arley. Both churches were originally built in response to the great influx of workers (mainly miners) who arrived in North Warwickshire with their families during the twenty five years or so following 1920.

== Origins ==
=== St Anne's ===
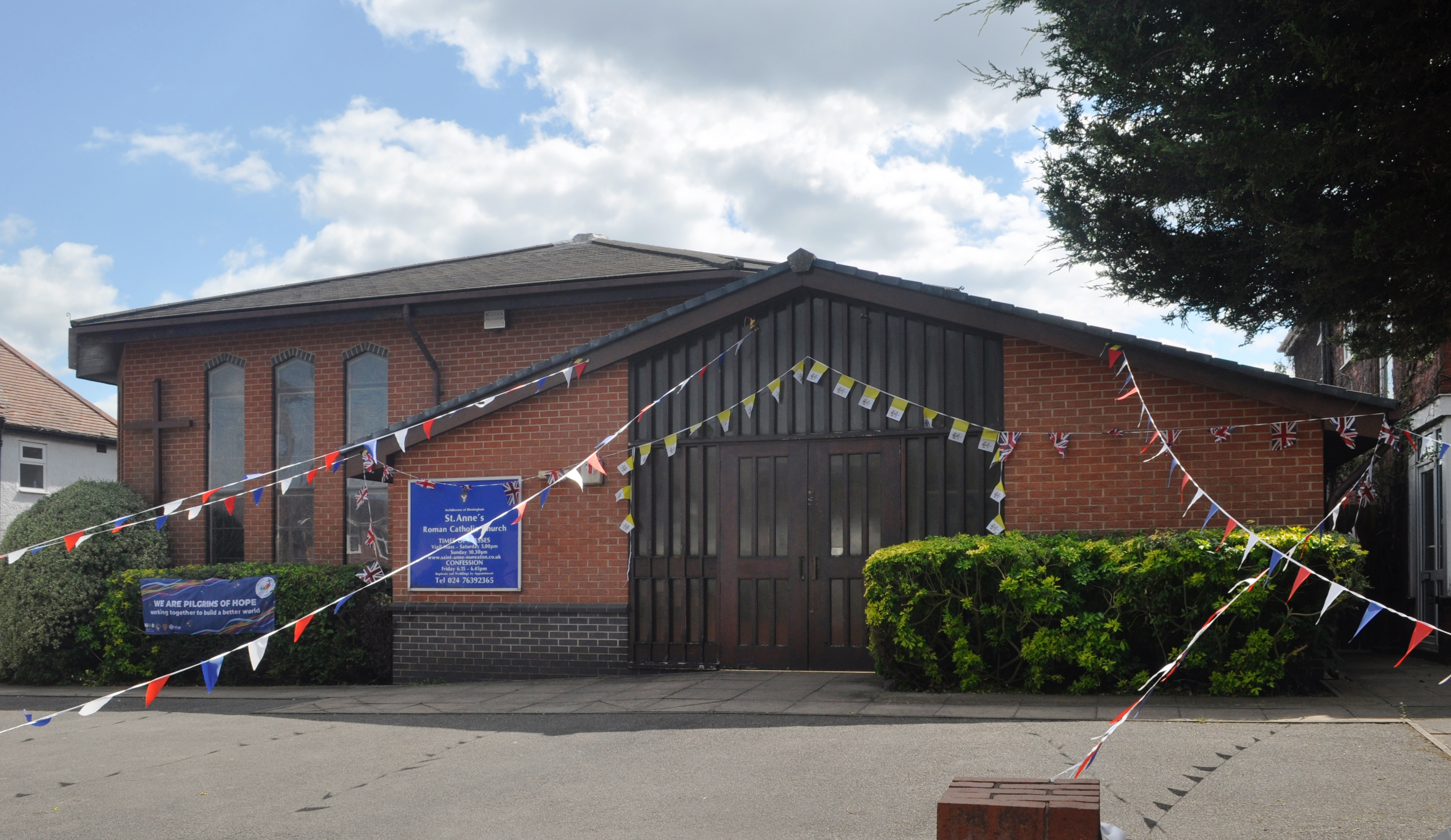
St Anne's Church in 2025

The parish of St Anne, Chapel End, Nuneaton began its life just after the second world war. The western side of Nuneaton was – in common with the wider area – greatly shaped by quarrying and mining. At that time, all of Nuneaton was part of the parish of Our Lady of the Angels, in the town centre. In the mid-1930s Mass was being said by priests from that church in a house in Tunnel Road, Galley Common, a mining community at that time. Ten years later, they were saying Mass in the Green Lane Miners’ Hostel, Camp Hill, just off Camp Hill Road. In about 1946 the Hostel became unavailable, and the congregation was offered the use of an abandoned isolation hospital off Windmill Road. This was far from ideal, and so, after much planning and fundraising (bricks were sold at 1d each, for example) the foundation stone of the first St Anne's Church was laid on 19 February 1949 by Fr Cox, parish priest of Our Lady of the Angels. On 13 July of the same year Archbishop Masterson, the Archbishop of Birmingham, blessed and opened the building.

The original St Anne's Church was a much loved building that had served as a schoolroom too. The time had come to replace it. After much planning work began on rebuilding, which was announced in the local press (view here). The presbytery became the weekday church building and Sunday Masses were celebrated in the school hall. On 11 March 2000—the Jubilee Year—the foundation stone was blessed by Bishop Philip Pargeter, in the presence of hundreds of parishioners and guests, with music provided by children of the school.

The building was ready for use a little while later, and was blessed by Archbishop Vincent Nichols (then the Archbishop of Birmingham), during a Mass on 11 November 2000. It was a day of much rejoicing, and the end of years of planning and construction work in the parish.

=== St Joseph's ===
Arley had been part of the parish of Bedworth, and in the 1920s Canon Wall began to say Mass in various houses in the village. By the mid-1920s, coal mining was attracting an influx of workers to Arley (many from the north of England) and the village grew. A site was acquired and, with the help and support of the community, a wooden church was built and in the summer of 1926 a procession from Arley Cricket ground to St Joseph's marked the opening of the new church. By 1928, a congregation of two dozen was normal. During the height of the Second World War, the church was used less and parishioners attended Mass at Nuneaton or Bedworth. After the war, things picked up and a succession of curates from Nuneaton and Bedworth took care of the Catholic community. At that time, St Joseph's had a hall which became a centre of social activity.

In 1959, responsibility for St Joseph's and the surrounding area was transferred from the parish of Bedworth to the parish of St Anne, Chapel End. Over the years, this parish with its two churches expanded, the parish school was founded and a worshipping community was cared for by a succession of parish priests.

St Joseph's deteriorating condition made it the priority and after demolition and a time of worshipping in Arley WMC, the foundation stone of the new St Joseph's was blessed by Archbishop Maurice Couve de Murville, the Archbishop of Birmingham, on 12 December 1996. Many parishioners and guests were present, including the architect and builder.

== Schools ==
The parish school (St Anne's Catholic Primary School) was established in the 1960s and it moved to its present site in 1968. It is a voluntary aided school, for ages nursery to year 6, and as such both Warwickshire County Council and the Archdiocese of Birmingham have an interest in it. It is a feeder school to St. Thomas More Secondary School & Sixth Form, Nuneaton (which is, technically, in the neighbouring Parish of Our Lady of the Angels).
