= Kingsbury Colliery =

Coal mine in Warwickshire, England

Coordinates: 52.5720°N 1.6760°W

Kingsbury Colliery was a coal mine in Kingsbury, Warwickshire, which operated between 1897 and 1968.

== History ==
It was opened in 1897 and changed the nature of the village almost overnight from a predominantly agriculturally based community to a mining village, and helped Kingsbury's expansion. Coal extracted from Kingsbury Colliery was used mainly for industry in nearby Birmingham, although the Lurghi Gas Plant at Coleshill was also a major customer.

The colliery operated throughout the first half of the 20th century, and in 1904 the village of Piccadilly was built close by to house some of the mine's workers. Following the pit's closure in 1968, some of the land was used for the construction of the Kingsbury Oil Terminal.

In 2009 a memorial wall was built in Piccadilly to remember those who worked in both Kingsbury Colliery, and the neighbouring Dexter Colliery. The wall contains the names of all the miners who worked at both mines. The centrepiece of the wall is a miner's lamp that is always lit to commemorate those who have died and those who remember working down the mines.

== Notable employees ==
Notable people who have worked at the colliery include the footballer Sid Ireland.

== See also ==
- Coventry Colliery
- Daw Mill
