= Hurley, Warwickshire =

Village in Warwickshire, England

Coordinates: 52.561°N 1.643°W

Hurley
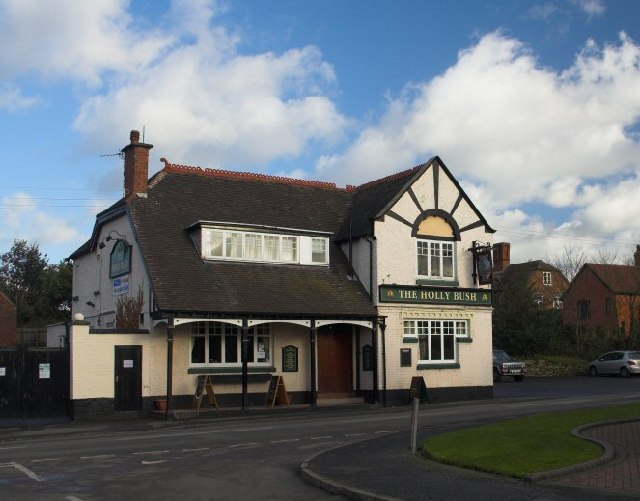
- The Holly Bush pub

- Location within Warwickshire
- OS grid reference: SP 2430 9598
- Civil parish: Kingsbury
- District: North Warwickshire
- Shire county: Warwickshire
- Region: West Midlands
- Country: England
- Sovereign state: United Kingdom
- Post town: Atherstone
- Postcode district: CV9
- Dialling code: 01827
- Police: Warwickshire
- Fire: Warwickshire
- Ambulance: West Midlands
- UK Parliament: North Warwickshire
- Website: Kingsbury Parish Council

Hurley is a village in the Kingsbury civil parish of North Warwickshire, England. Other nearby places include Wood End, Hurley Common, Coleshill, Water Orton, Curdworth, Atherstone and Tamworth. According to the 2001 Census the population of the Hurley and Wood End ward was 3,642.

== History ==
Hurley became a village in 1861 when its Church of the Resurrection was consecrated. There were a number of mines in the Hurley area, including Dexter Colliery which opened in 1926. Some of the social housing in the village was built to accommodate workers at the mines. During the early half of the 20th century the majority of people who lived in the village worked in nearby collieries, including Dexter Colliery and Kingsbury Colliery. Both closed in the late 1960s.

== Religion ==
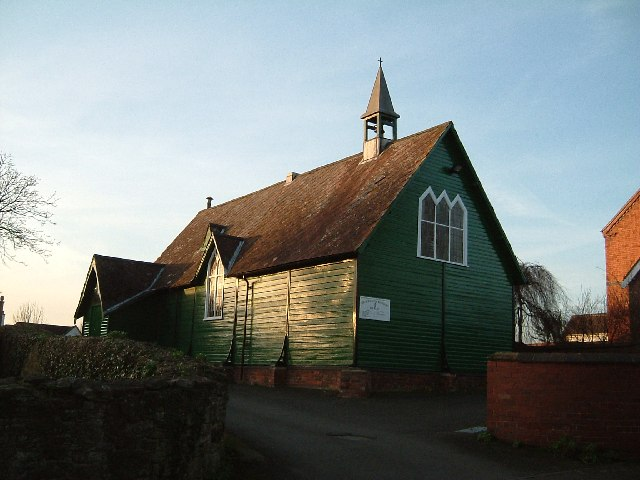
Church of the Resurrection

The Church of England Church of the Resurrection is a wooden mission church, part of the Kingsbury and Baxterley Group of Churches. Hurley is in the Roman Catholic Parish of St John the Baptist, of which the main collegiate church is St John's Presbytery in Tamworth.

== Economy ==
Hurley has a small store and Post Office on Brick Kiln Lane. There is an Indian takeaway on Knowle Hill. The village also has a public house called the Holly Bush Inn. The headquarters of the construction and maintenance firm Promanex Group are just outside Hurley. Most residents commute to work in Tamworth, Atherstone, Nuneaton, Birmingham and Coventry, with manufacturing being the most common type of employment, followed by wholesale and retail.

== Demographics ==
Over 99.5% of people (3,550) described themselves as White British with 92 people from other ethnic groups. The village has an almost 50:50 split of males and females, with a ratio of 1,822 to 1,820 respectively.

According to the 2001 Census the ward of Hurley and Wood End is 80% Christian, 19% Non-Religious and 1% Other.

== Governance ==
The village was part of the Tamworth Rural District from its creation in 1894, until 1965 when it became part of the Atherstone Rural District. In 1974 under the Local Government Act 1972 Hurley became part of the newly formed district of North Warwickshire. Inside North Warwickshire it is part of the Hurley and Wood End Ward, and because of the mining connection the village often elects Labour councillors. Hurley is part of the North Warwickshire parliamentary constituency and the current MP is Conservative Craig Tracey.

== Crime ==
In 2009 there was an average of 3.6 crimes per 1,000 people for the ward of Hurley and Wood End, and during the same period there were 5 crimes per head for the borough of North Warwickshire. In 2010 the figure was down to 3 crimes per head. The most common type of crime is anti-social behaviour.

== Education ==
There is a small primary school, Hurley Primary School, for children up to the age of 11.

== Public services ==
Water and sewage services are provided by Severn Trent Water. The nearest police and fire stations are in Atherstone. Unlike Kingsbury, Hurley uses a Coventry (CV) postcode rather than a Birmingham (B) postcode. The postal town is Atherstone. The village lies in the North Warwickshire NHS trust area. The village has a small GP's office on Knowle Hill which is part of a larger practice in Kingsbury. The George Eliot Hospital at Nuneaton is the area's local hospital. It has an Accident and Emergency Department. Out of hours GP services are also based at George Eliot. There is also Good Hope Hospital in Sutton Coldfield. Local facilities include a village hall, and a small playing field and play area on Brick Kiln Lane. The nearest leisure facilities are based in Kingsbury at the village's Kingsbury school. A little further afield is the Snowdome in Tamworth.

== Transport ==
Hurley lies close to the M42 at junction 10. The village has seven bus stops and is served by routes 766, 767, 115, 118 and 119, linking it to Atherstone, Kingsbury and Tamworth. There is a market day bus to Atherstone on Tuesdays. The nearest railway station is Wilnecote. The nearest airport is Birmingham.

== Media ==
The local newspaper covering the area is the Tamworth Herald, which has a separate edition for North Warwickshire. Local radio includes BBC CWR, Hits Radio Coventry & Warwickshire and Capital Mid-Counties. The village is covered by the Central ITV and BBC West Midlands TV regions broadcast from the nearby Sutton Coldfield transmitting station.

== See also ==
- Coventry Colliery
- Daw Mill
