= Daw Mill =

Coal mine in Warwickshire, England

Coordinates: 52°30′23″N 1°37′04″W

Daw Mill colliery
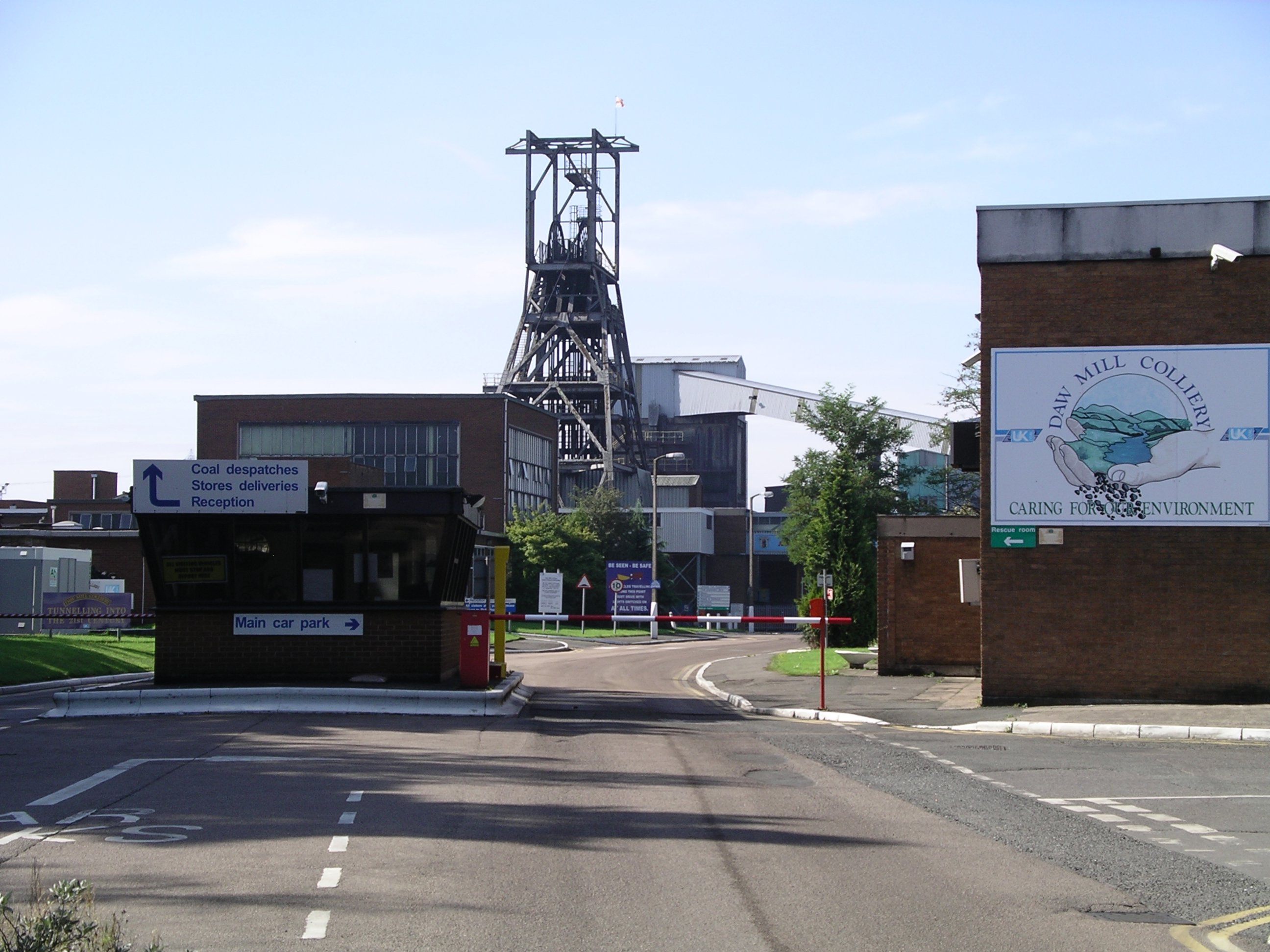
- Entrance to Daw Mill colliery, September 2006
- Interactive map of Daw Mill colliery
- Location: Arley, Warwickshire, United Kingdom
- Products: Coal from the Warwickshire coalfield
- Opened: 1956
- Active: 1956–2013
- Closed: 2013
- Company: UK Coal

Daw Mill was a coal mine located near the village of Arley, near Nuneaton, in the English county of Warwickshire. The mine was Britain's biggest coal producer. It closed in 2013 following a major fire. It was the last remaining colliery in the West Midlands.

== Mine ==
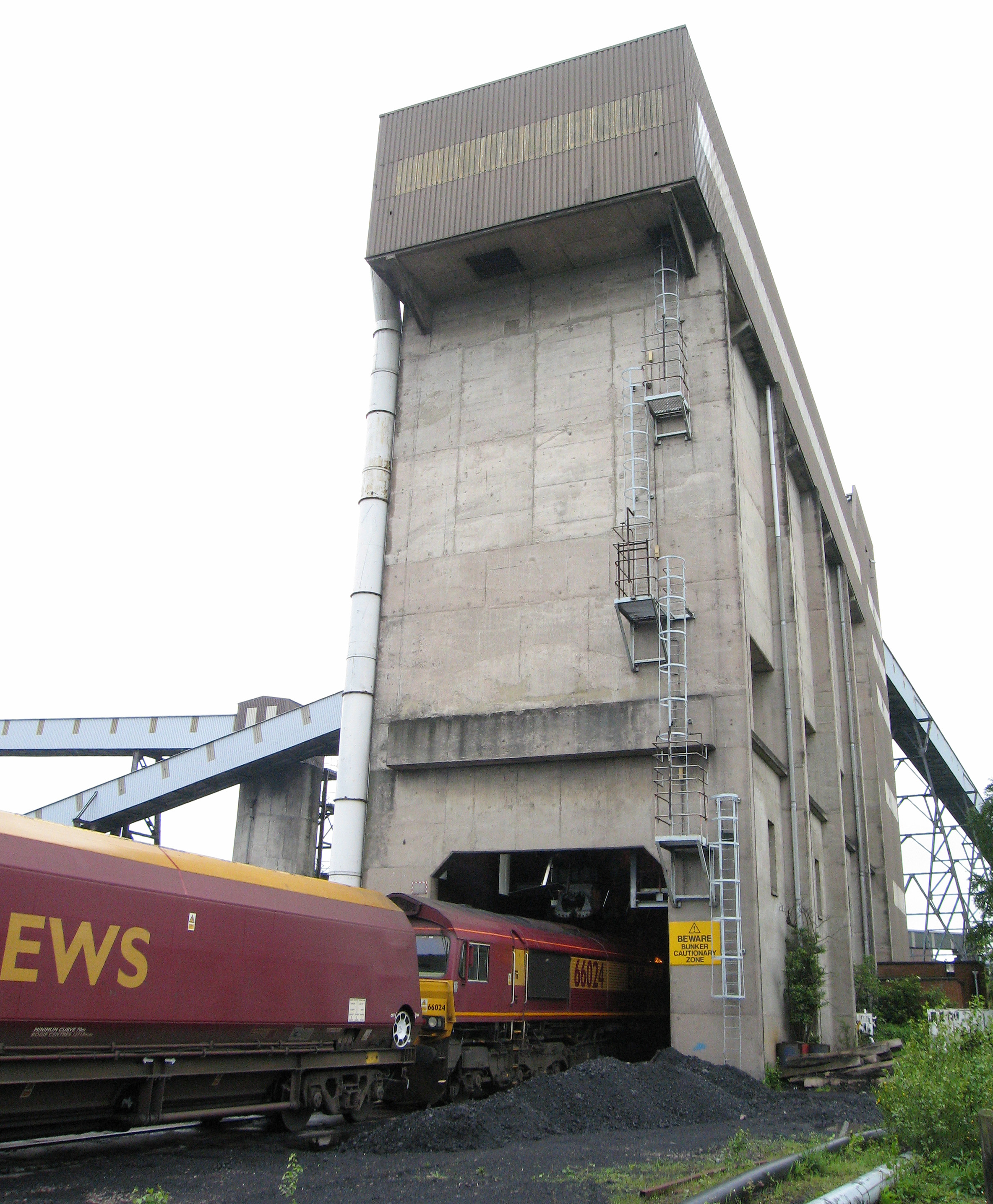
Loading coal into a train at the rapid loader at Daw Mill Colliery, May 2008

Daw Mill mined a five-metre thick section of the Warwickshire Coalfield (known as the Warwickshire Thick) in the north of the county. It was owned and operated by UK Coal and in 2008 employed 680 people.

The two shafts that served Daw Mill were first sunk between 1956 and 1959, and 1969 and 1971 respectively. The mine was a natural extension of the former collieries Kingsbury Colliery and Dexter Colliery, both of which have also closed. In 1983 an inclined tunnel linking underground workings with the surface was completed. This drift mining enabled Daw Mill to increase its production capacity as it removed the often time-consuming process of winding coal up the shafts.

Daw Mill was the last surviving mine in a county that once had 20 operating collieries. In 2008 it excavated 3.25 million tonnes of coal, beating a 13-year-old record for annual output at a British coal mine set at Selby in North Yorkshire.

== Transport ==
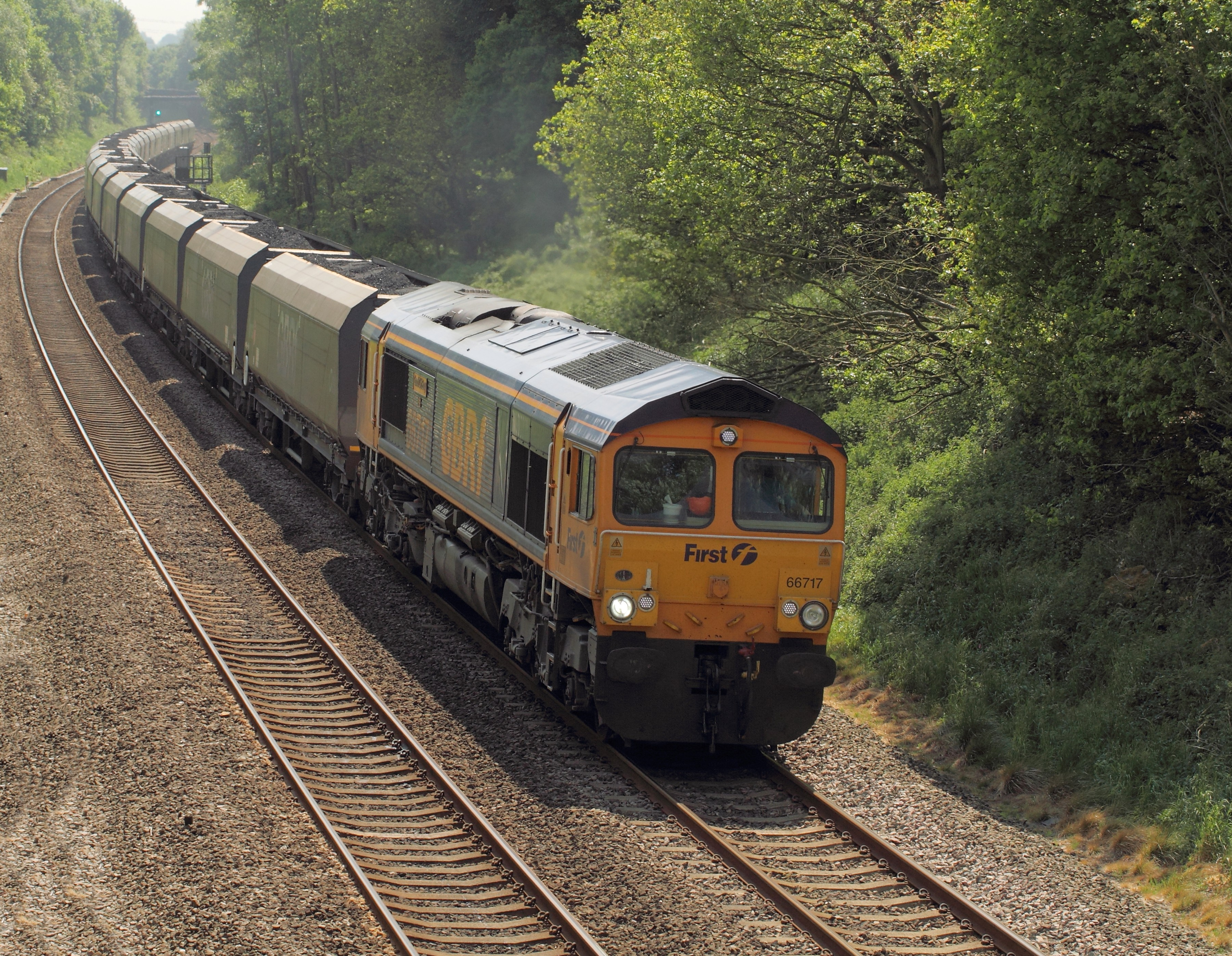
GB Railfreight 66717 hauling a coal train to Drax power station

The colliery was situated on the Birmingham to Nuneaton Line, just east of the former Shustoke railway station. Trains were operated (post British Rail) mainly by EWS / DB Schenker but inroads were made by Fastline, Freightliner and GB Railfreight.

== Accidents ==
Three men were killed at Daw Mill in mining accidents in 2006 and 2007. In 2011 UK Coal was fined £1.2 million for safety breaches.

On 22 February 2013, a major fire broke out 500 metres (1,600 ft) underground, described as the worst underground blaze in Britain for 30 years. UK Coal and Warwickshire Fire and Rescue Service confirmed that 92 workers were safely extracted. As of 7 March 2013 the fire had still not been fully extinguished. It was initially estimated that remedial work to the colliery could take between three and six months, making a return to production subject to a further review, resulting in the possible immediate closure of the mine. The fire was finally extinguished nearly 3 months later on 15 May 2013.

== Closure ==
On 14 March 2012 it was reported that UK Coal had begun a consultation process as part of plans for a company restructure which could see the closure of the mine in 2014.

The Coal Authority stated in a 2012 report that if High Speed 2 were to be built, then Daw Mill would be forced to close due to associated development and the effects on local groundworks.

On 7 March 2013 UK Coal announced the closure of the mine, due to the destructive fire which had extensively damaged it, with the plan to make most of the 650 staff redundant.

== Land redevelopment plans ==
In July 2013, the ownership of the Daw Mill site was transferred to property redevelopment firm Harworth Estates after UK Coal went into insolvency. Harworth subsequently submitted plans to North Warwickshire Borough Council to turn the land into a business park, which included proposals for an HGV depot, but withdrew their application in October 2014 after encountering opposition from local residents and councillors, who felt the scheme would be unworkable. One of their key objections was the volume of traffic that would be generated in the local area. Harworth said they would submit a revised proposal. A fresh set of plans was put forward in November. These included a "low-level rail hub", and a one third reduction in the size of the development. The proposals were further refined, and a second revised application made in July 2015.

Having initially objected to the proposals on the grounds of the size of the road network that would be needed to support the new development, the Highways Department of Warwickshire County Council announced in October 2015 that it would now support the development. The decision prompted local MP Craig Tracey, whose North Warwickshire constituency includes the site, to write to the Department urging it to reconsider its stance. His letter highlighted the potential impact the business park would have on the nearby town of Coleshill, which he said would be adversely affected by the increase in traffic flow. North Warwickshire Borough Council's planning committee unanimously rejected Harworth's proposals on 3 November, citing fears that the development would cause "substantial" harm to the local green belt. Harworth announced that it would appeal the decision.

The Court of Appeal ruled in 2018 that there could be no further appeals and that the land must be restored to green field within the greenbelt.

== See also ==
- Coventry Colliery
