= Whitacre Heath =

Village in United Kingdom

Coordinates: 52°31′54″N 1°40′48″W

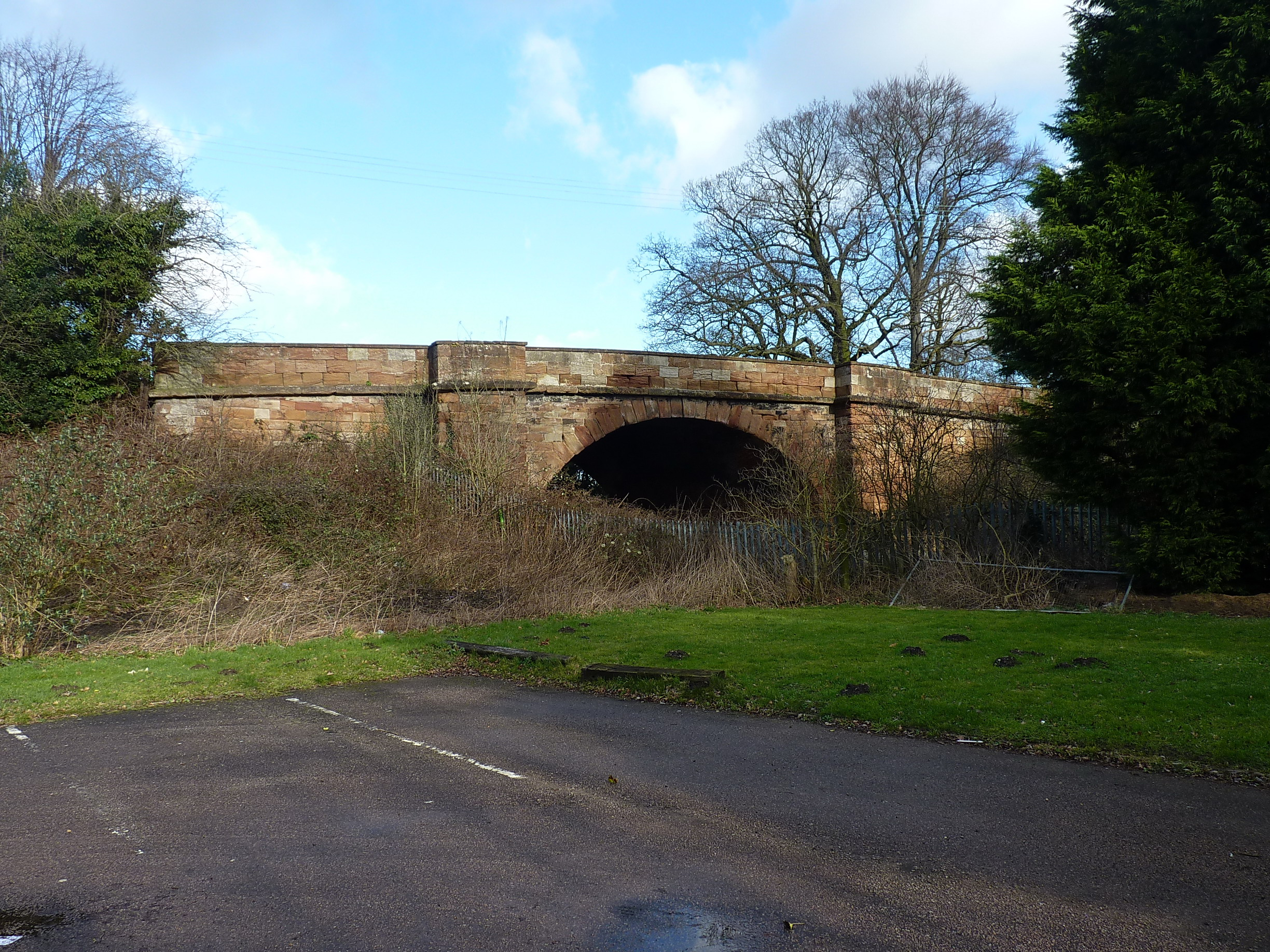
Whitacre Heath railway bridge

Whitacre Heath is a small village in the North Warwickshire district of the county of Warwickshire in England. It is one of 'The Whitacres' - Whitacre Heath, Nether Whitacre and Over Whitacre. Whitacre Heath is actually the heath of Nether Whitacre and not a separate parish. Whitacre Heath is newer and of 19th-century origin. It stems from the early days of railways in the 1830s, and from later developments by Joseph Chamberlain and the Water Department of the City of Birmingham. The Stonebridge Railway was opened on 12 August 1839 to provide a link between the Birmingham and Derby Junction Railway (later the Midland Railway) and the London and Birmingham Railway at Hampton in Arden, via Stonebridge. The line became redundant in the 1930s and the track bed is now a footpath for walkers. There are Victorian brick buildings for the management of drinking water, at Whitacre water works, which were originally associated with public works by the City of Birmingham. The village is now largely residential and agricultural.

== Whitacre Heath nature reserve ==
West of the village, land alongside the River Tame is a local nature reserve owned and managed by the Warwickshire Wildlife Trust. The site lies on the river's flood plain and includes disused gravel workings. It is designated a Site of Special Scientific Interest (SSSI) due to its wetland breeding birds.
