= Kingsbury Oil Terminal =

Oil storage depot in Warwickshire, England

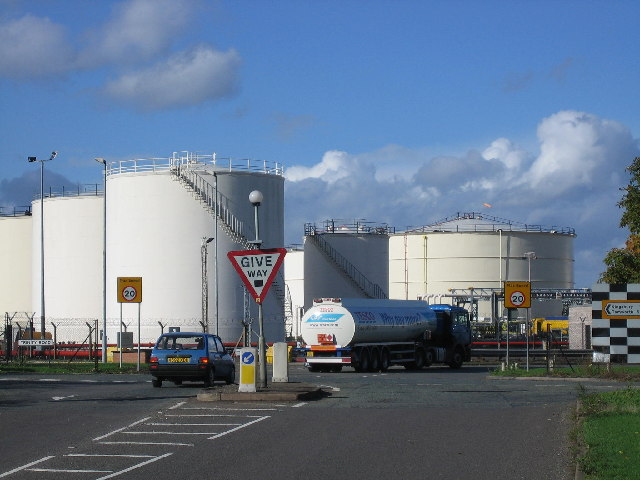

- Location within Warwickshire

General information
- Type: Oil storage depot
- Location: Kingsbury, Warwickshire, Trinity Road; Kingsbury; Tamworth; Staffordshire
- Coordinates: 52.5732°N 1.6723°W
- Completed: 19 March 1969
- Inaugurated: 24 March 1969
- Cost: £3.5m
- Owner: Essar; Warwickshire Oil Storage Limited; Valero Energy; Shell; British Pipeline Agency

Kingsbury Oil Terminal is an oil storage depot located to the northeast of the village of Kingsbury, Warwickshire, England.

It was opened in the late 1960s and serves the Midlands region. It is the largest inland oil storage depot in the United Kingdom.

The main operators at the site are Essar, Warwickshire Oil Storage Limited and Valero Energy Corporation. The site also has facilities from Shell and pipeline operations from the British Pipeline Agency.

== History ==
It opened on 19 March 1969, and officially opened on 24 March 1969 by Roy Mason, the Minister of Power, and also the Thames-Mersey oil pipeline, which cost £8.5m, being 245 miles. This pipeline would carry 4m tonnes of oil per year, at first, leading to 8m tonnes. There was an official luncheon at The Belfry in Wishaw, Warwickshire.

It cost £3.5m, with 36 tanks, holding 200,000 tons. 200 road tankers would operate, with a 50 mile radius from the site. It was built for Regent Oil, Mobil, Shell-Mex and BP, and Petrofina.

In August 2006 the terminal was targeted by terrorists as part of a terror plot involving several sites across the country.

== Protests ==
During protests by Just Stop Oil and Extinction Rebellion in April 2022, more than 100 climate activists, ages ranging between 25 and 71, were arrested.

On 14 September 2022, 51 Just Stop Oil protesters were arrested for breach of court order after blocking the entrance to the Kingsbury Oil Terminal.
