= Kingsbury, Warwickshire =

Village in Warwickshire, England

Coordinates: 52.56143°N 1.69165°W

Kingsbury
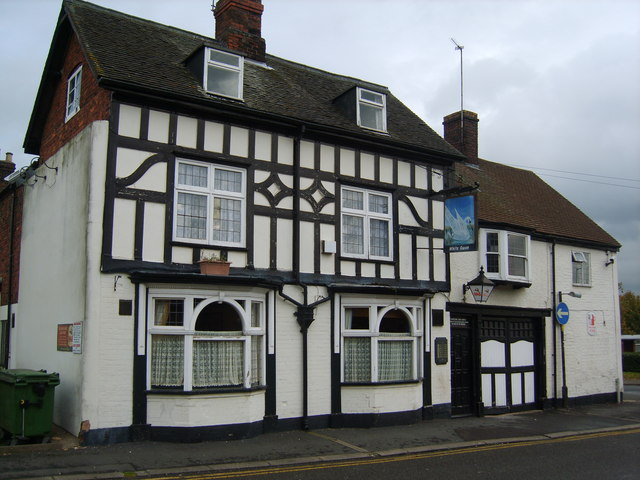
- The White Swan Kingsbury, Warwickshire

- Location within Warwickshire
- Population: 7,562 (2021)
- OS grid reference: SP2196
  - London: 100 mi (160 km) SE
- Civil parish: Kingsbury
- District: North Warwickshire
- Shire county: Warwickshire
- Region: West Midlands
- Country: England
- Sovereign state: United Kingdom
- Post town: TAMWORTH
- Postcode district: B78
- Dialling code: 01827
- Police: Warwickshire
- Fire: Warwickshire
- Ambulance: West Midlands
- UK Parliament: North Warwickshire

Kingsbury is a large village and civil parish in the North Warwickshire district of the county of Warwickshire, in the West Midlands region of England. The civil parish population at the 2021 census was 7,562.

The village is situated close to the Staffordshire border between Tamworth and Birmingham, which is 5.5 miles (9 km) to the north, and overlooks the River Tame. The A51 to Chester starts from here; as does the A4097, which runs through Curdworth and Minworth before joining the A38. This continues to Junction 6 of the M6 (Spaghetti Junction) giving access to the motorway network of the Midlands and the City of Birmingham. Kingsbury is notable for the Kingsbury Water Park, a shooting range and a large oil storage depot to the north-east. The church of Saint Peter and Saint Paul dates from the 12th century and is a grade II* listed building.

== History ==
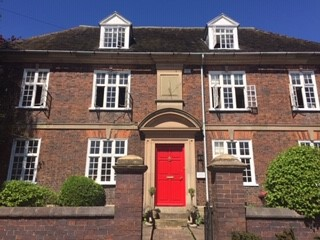
Thomas Coton's original school.

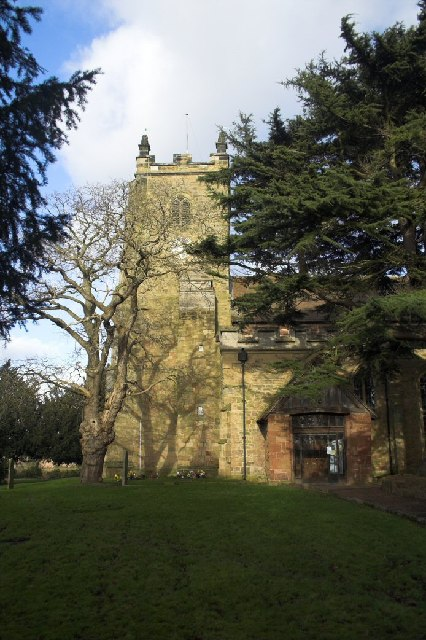
The old 12th-century Church of St Peter & St Paul, Kingsbury next to the River Tame

The name Kingsbury is derived from the Saxon Chingesburie meaning 'Kings Castle' or 'Kings Fort'. The 'bury' part of the name means 'fort' or 'defensive work'. Kingsbury Hall (or Bracebridge Hall as it was their family home for many years) is now only part lived in as a farmhouse. It was a fortified manor house and the remains of a curtain wall can still be seen. Kingsbury was founded by the same Angles tribe that established Curdworth and Minworth. The village is mentioned in the Domesday survey.

Kingsbury was also the name of a water mill, used for many purposes including milling corn into flour. Later it was used as a garden centre. A bridge was built across the River Tame near to the mill in 1783. This was a single carriageway so traffic lights were installed later on, until it was bypassed by a new road to serve the oil terminal in the 1960s. The central section of the old bridge was swept away by a flash flood in the early 1980s and was replaced with modern concrete. It is now used for pedestrians only.

In 1473–74 during the Wars of the Roses there was a family dispute involving the Bracebridges and their distant relations, the Ardens (William Shakespeare's maternal ancestors) of Park Hall in Castle Bromwich. John Arden had fallen in love with Alice Bracebridge. John's father, Sir Walter, did not approve. John was kidnapped and taken to Bracebridge Hall. Sir Walter appealed to King Edward IV, who appointed Sir Simon de Montford of Coleshill and Sir Richard Bingham of Middleton to arbitrate. John and Alice were married in February 1474. In 1502 John inherited Park Hall in Castle Bromwich, while his younger brother Thomas settled at Wilmcote near Stratford-upon-Avon. Thomas had a son Robert who was the father of Mary Arden, William Shakespeare's mother.

The stones of the church porch show evidence of arrow-sharpening grooves, sometimes said to have been done by soldiers but more probably by hunting parties or locals waiting their turn for the nearby village butts, as all males had to be proficient with a longbow. In 1686, Thomas Coton established one of the first poor schools in Kingsbury. Until the 19th century Kingsbury was a small hamlet, and the main landowner in the area was the Prime Minister Sir Robert Peel. The Birmingham and Derby Railway was built through Kingsbury in 1839 and industry was soon established, most notably coal mining and gravel extraction, which fuelled the expansion of the village.

== Governance ==
The village of Kingsbury forms part of a larger civil parish of the same name which includes the nearby settlements of Foul End, Hurley, Hurley Common, Piccadilly and Wood End. In the 2001 census, the parish had a population of 7,523. The urban area of Kingsbury village itself had 4,168 inhabitants.

== Kingsbury today ==
The mine, Kingsbury Colliery, has now gone and the railway station was closed in 1968 under the Beeching cuts. Although the station building has gone, the station master's house (built by LMS in 1926) still exists alongside the site. The large Kingsbury Oil Terminal, which serve the whole of the Midlands, were established in the late-1960s to the north-east of Kingsbury. Diamond West Midlands service 76/76A which begins in Tamworth provides a regular link to Kingsbury with occasional journeys extended to Sutton Coldfield.

Kingsbury Water Park, which is situated between Kingsbury and Bodymoor Heath, is a series of 15 lakes, situated in 600 acres (2.4 km^{2}) of land. It was reclaimed from the old gravel pits. It is now home to a camp site, children's play areas, a sailing club, model boat club and jet ski and power boat racing clubs.

Kingsbury is now mainly a large commuter village. Although relatively small, the village has facilities and services including a primary school, secondary school, a swimming pool (situated at the secondary school but open to the public), two public houses, the Swan and the Royal Oak, a country club, churches, a doctors' surgery and shops.

== Sources ==
- Allen, Geoff (2000): Warwickshire Towns & Villages. ISBN 1-85058-642-X
