= Tamworth Rural District =

Local government area in England, abolished 1965

Coordinates: 52.59°N 1.68°W

Tamworth was a rural district in the English Midlands from 1894 until its abolition in 1965. The architect Alfred Cheatle was for many years chairman.

It was created under the Local Government Act 1894 from Tamworth rural sanitary district, and was one of a handful of rural districts to cross county boundaries, with part in Staffordshire and part in Warwickshire. It entirely surrounded the town of Tamworth.

The Staffordshire part was made part of Lichfield Rural District in 1934, under a County Review Order, leaving only the Warwickshire part, to the south and east of Tamworth.

The rest of the district was abolished in 1965, with part (including the majority of the population) going to the borough of Tamworth, and part going to Meriden Rural District, with most going to Atherstone Rural District.
