= Anglican Diocese of Birmingham =

Diocese of the Church of England

Diocese of Birmingham Dioecesis Birminghamiensis
- Coat of arms

- Flag

Location
- Country: United Kingdom
- Ecclesiastical province: Canterbury
- Archdeaconries: Aston, Birmingham

Statistics
- Parishes: 162
- Churches: 195

Information
- Denomination: Church of England
- Established: 1905
- Cathedral: Cathedral Church of St Philip
- Language: English

Current leadership
- Bishop: Michael Volland, Bishop of Birmingham
- Suffragan: Esther Prior, Bishop of Aston
- Archdeacons: Jenny Tomlinson, Archdeacon of Birmingham; Phelim O'Hare, Archdeacon of Aston

Website
- https://www.cofebirmingham.com/

The Diocese of Birmingham is a diocese founded in 1905 in the Church of England's Province of Canterbury, covering the north-west of the traditional county of Warwickshire, the south-east of the traditional county of Staffordshire and the north-east of the traditional county of Worcestershire (now the central section of the West Midlands and small parts of south Staffordshire, north Warwickshire and north Worcestershire) in England.

== Cathedral ==
The see is in the centre of the City of Birmingham, where the seat of the diocese is located at the Cathedral Church of Saint Philip.

The 18th-century parish church of Saint Philip in Birmingham was elevated to cathedral status in 1905 when the see was founded, on 13 January 1905. Previously the area had been part of the Diocese of Worcester.

== Bishops ==
Besides the diocesan Bishop of Birmingham (Michael Volland) and the Bishop suffragan of Aston (Esther Prior; which see was created in 1954), there are two retired bishops resident in (or near) the diocese who are licensed to serve as honorary assistant bishops:

- 2002–present: Maurice Sinclair is a retired Presiding Bishop of the Southern Cone living in Selly Park.
- 2005–present: Iraj Mottahedeh is a retired diocesan Bishop of Iran who lives in Church Aston, Shropshire, in the neighbouring Lichfield diocese.

From 2023, alternative episcopal oversight (for parishes in the diocese who reject the ministry of women priests) was provided by the provincial episcopal visitor, the Bishop suffragan of Oswestry (since 2023 Paul Thomas), who is licensed as an honorary assistant bishop of the diocese in order to facilitate his work there.

== Archdeaconries and deaneries ==
The former deaneries of Yardley and Bordesley were merged in 2000. Central Birmingham was known as Birmingham City until 1996 and then Birmingham City Centre until 2004.

Diocese	Archdeaconries	Rural Deaneries	Churches	Population	People/church
Diocese of Birmingham	Archdeaconry of Aston	Deanery of Aston	10	94,960	9,496
Diocese of Birmingham	Archdeaconry of Aston	Deanery of Coleshill	18	137,541	7,641
Diocese of Birmingham	Archdeaconry of Aston	Deanery of Polesworth	18	39,549	2,197
Diocese of Birmingham	Archdeaconry of Aston	Deanery of Solihull	13	77,632	5,972
Diocese of Birmingham	Archdeaconry of Aston	Deanery of Sutton Coldfield	14	102,817	7,344
Diocese of Birmingham	Archdeaconry of Aston	Deanery of Yardley & Bordesley	16	206,603	12,913
Diocese of Birmingham	Archdeaconry of Birmingham	Deanery of Central Birmingham	9*	51,631*	5,737
Diocese of Birmingham	Archdeaconry of Birmingham	Deanery of Edgbaston	13	129,568	9,967
Diocese of Birmingham	Archdeaconry of Birmingham	Deanery of Handsworth	14	164,792	11,771
Diocese of Birmingham	Archdeaconry of Birmingham	Deanery of King's Norton	17	125,538	7,385
Diocese of Birmingham	Archdeaconry of Birmingham	Deanery of Moseley	16	134,813	8,426
Diocese of Birmingham	Archdeaconry of Birmingham	Deanery of Shirley	15	112,341	7,489
Diocese of Birmingham	Archdeaconry of Birmingham	Deanery of Warley	11	121,861	11,078
Total/average			184	1,499,646	8,150

*including Cathedral

== Churches ==
APC = ancient parish church.

=== Not in a deanery ===
Benefice	Churches	Founded (building)	Population served
Cathedra	Cathedral of St Philip, Birmingham	1715	5,310

=== Deanery of Aston ===
Benefice	Churches	Founded (building)	Population served
Aston (St James) (St Peter and St Paul) and Nechells	SS Peter & Paul, Aston	APC	23,808
Aston (St James) (St Peter and St Paul) and Nechells	St James, Aston	1891	23,808
Aston (St James) (St Peter and St Paul) and Nechells	St Matthew, Nechells	1839	23,808
Erdington (St Barnabas)	St Barnabas, Erdington	1822	17,167
Erdington (St Chad)	St Chad, Erdington	1914	7,232
Erdington Christ the King	St Martin, Perry Common		19,137
Erdington Christ the King	St Margaret, Short Heath		19,137
Gravelly Hill (All Saints)	All Saints, Gravelly Hill	1900	17,313
Stockland Green (St Mark)	St Mark, Stockland Green	1908	17,313
Pype Hayes (St Mary the Virgin)	St Mary the Virgin, Pype Hayes	1929	10,303

=== Deanery of Coleshill ===
Benefice	Churches	Founded (building)	Population served
Castle Bromwich (St Clement)	St Clement of Alexandria, Castle Bromwich		12,593
Castle Bromwich (St Mary and St Margaret)	SS Mary & Margaret, Castle Bromwich		7,559
Chelmsley Wood (St Andrew)	St Andrew, Chelmsley Wood		16,194
Garretts Green (St Thomas) and Tile Cross	St Thomas, Garretts Green		19,423
Garretts Green (St Thomas) and Tile Cross	St Peter, Tile Cross		19,423
Hodge Hill (St Philip and St James)	SS Philip & James, Hodge Hill		19,008
Kingshurst (St Barnabas)	St Barnabas, Kingshurst		8,882
Lea Hall (St Richard)	St Richard, Lea Hall		8,389
Marston Green (St Leonard)	St Leonard, Marston Green		6,793
Coleshill (St Peter and St Paul)	SS Peter & Paul, Coleshill		6,717
Maxstoke (St Michael and All Angels)	St Michael & All Angels, Maxstoke		6,717
Shard End (All Saints)	All Saints, Shard End	1954	11,532
Sheldon (St Giles)	St Giles, Sheldon	APC	14,906
Water Orton (St Peter and St Paul)	SS Peter & Paul, Water Orton	APC	3,444
The Whitacres, Lea Marston, and Shustoke	St John the Baptist, Lea Marton		2,101
The Whitacres, Lea Marston, and Shustoke	St Cuthbert, Shustoke		2,101
The Whitacres, Lea Marston, and Shustoke	St Giles, Nether Whitacre		2,101
The Whitacres, Lea Marston, and Shustoke	St Leonard, Over Whitacre		2,101

=== Deanery of Polesworth ===
Benefice	Churches	Founded (building)	Population served
All Souls, North Warwickshire, Comprising Austrey, Newton Regis, Seckington, Shuttington, and Warton	St Nicholas, Austrey		3,360
All Souls, North Warwickshire, Comprising Austrey, Newton Regis, Seckington, Shuttington, and Warton	St Mary, Newton Regis		3,360
All Souls, North Warwickshire, Comprising Austrey, Newton Regis, Seckington, Shuttington, and Warton	All Saints, Seckington		3,360
All Souls, North Warwickshire, Comprising Austrey, Newton Regis, Seckington, Shuttington, and Warton	St Matthew, Shuttington		3,360
All Souls, North Warwickshire, Comprising Austrey, Newton Regis, Seckington, Shuttington, and Warton	Holy Trinity, Warton		3,360
Amington (St Editha)	St Editha, Amington	APC	8,250
Baddesley Ensor (St Nicholas) with Grendon	St Nicholas, Baddesley Ensor		3,537
Baddesley Ensor (St Nicholas) with Grendon	All Saints, Grendon		3,537
Baxterley (Not Known) with Hurley and Wood End and Merevale with Bentley	Baxterley Parish Church	APC	8,055
Baxterley (Not Known) with Hurley and Wood End and Merevale with Bentley	Resurrection, Hurley	1861	8,055
Baxterley (Not Known) with Hurley and Wood End and Merevale with Bentley	St Michael & All Angels, Wood End	1906	8,055
Baxterley (Not Known) with Hurley and Wood End and Merevale with Bentley	St Mary the Virgin, Merevale	APC	8,055
Kingsbury (St Peter and St Paul)	SS Peter & Paul, Kingsbury	APC	8,055
Dordon (St Leonard)	St Leonard, Dordon		3,192
	St Mary, Freasley		
Dosthill (St Paul)	St Paul, Dosthill	1870	6,158
Polesworth (St Editha)	Abbey Church of St Editha, Polesworth	APC	6,997
Polesworth (St Editha)	St John, Birchmoor		6,997

=== Deanery of Solihull ===
Benefice	Churches	Population served
Balsall Common (St Peter)	St Peter, Balsall Common	5,459
Barston (St Swithin)	St Swithin, Barston	3,061
Hampton-In-Arden (St Mary and St Bartholomew) with Bickenhill St Peter	SS Mary & Bartholomew, Hampton-in-Arden	3,061
Hampton-In-Arden (St Mary and St Bartholomew) with Bickenhill St Peter	St Peter, Bickenhill (MED)	3,061
Elmdon (St Nicholas) (St Stephen's Church Centre) (Valley Church Centre)	St Nicholas, Elmdon (MED); St Stephen's Church Centre, Elmdon	8,887
Hobs Moat (St Mary)	St Mary, Hobs Moat	10,508
Knowle (St John the Baptist) (St Lawrence & St Anne)	SS John the Baptist, Lawrence & Anne, Knowle (MED)	9,165
Olton (St Margaret)	St Margaret, Olton	11,019
Solihull (Catherine De Barnes) (St Alphege) (St Helen) (St Michael)	St Alphege, Solihull; St Helen, Solihull; St Michael, Solihull	28,526
Temple Balsall (St Mary)	St Mary the Virgin, Temple Balsall (MED)	1,007

=== Deanery of Sutton Coldfield ===
Benefice	Churches	Population served
Boldmere (St Michael)	St Michael, Boldmere	14,291
Castle Vale (St Cuthbert of Lindisfarne) with Minworth	St Cuthbert of Lindisfarne, Castle Vale (1973); St George the Martyr, Minworth (1909)	11,470
Curdworth (St Nicholas and St Peter Ad Vincula) (St George), Middleton and Wishaw	SS Nicholas & Peter ad Vincula, Curdworth (MED); St John the Baptist, Middleton (MED); St Chad, Wishaw (MED)	1,981
Four Oaks (All Saints)	All Saints, Four Oaks (1908)	6,498
Hill (St James)	St James, Hill (1835)	12,269
Maney (St Peter)	St Peter, Maney (1877)	6,003
Sutton Coldfield (Holy Trinity)	Holy Trinity, Sutton Coldfield (MED)	10,736
Sutton Coldfield (St Chad)	St Chad, Sutton Coldfield (pre-1927)	14,461
Sutton Coldfield (St Columba)	St Columba, Sutton Coldfield	6,767
Walmley (St John the Evangelist)	St John the Evangelist, Walmley	13,340
Wylde Green (Emmanuel)	Emmanuel, Wylde Green (1909)	5,001

=== Deanery of Yardley and Bordesley ===
Benefice	Churches	Population served
Acocks Green (St Mary)	St Mary the Virgin, Acocks Green (1864)	15,747
Bordesley (St Benedict)	St Benedict, Bordesley (1898)	10,850
Saltley (St Saviour) and Washwood Heath	St Saviour, Saltley (1848); St Mark, Washwood Heath (1890)	28,747
Small Heath (All Saints)	All Saints, Small Heath (1893)	25,580
Sparkbrook (Christ Church)	Christ Church, Sparkbrook (1867)	7,000
Sparkhill (St John the Evangelist)	St John the Evangelist, Sparkhill (1888)	20,694
Springfield (St Christopher)	St Christopher, Springfield (1906)	7,638
Stechford (All Saints) (St Andrew)	All Saints, Stechford (1897)	12,616
Tyseley (St Edmund)	St Edmund, Tyseley	11,048
Ward End Holy Trinity (St Margaret) with Bordesley Green	Christ Church, Ward End; St Margaret, Ward End	27,753
Ward End Holy Trinity (St Margaret) with Bordesley Green	St Paul, Bordesley Green (1912)	27,753
Yardley (St Cyprian) Hay Mill	St Cyprian, Hay Mills (1860)	21,470
Yardley, South (St Michael and All Angels)	St Michael & All Angels, South Yardley	21,470
Yardley (St Edburgha)	St Edburgha, Yardley (MED)	17,460

=== Deanery of Central Birmingham ===
Benefice	Churches	Population served
Birmingham (St George)	St George, Newtown	6,837
Birmingham (St Luke)	St Luke, Gas Street	10,839
Birmingham (St Martin-In-The-Bull-Ring) with Bordesley St Andrew	St Martin in the Bull Ring, Birmingham (MED)	4,083
Birmingham (St Paul)	St Paul, Birmingham (1777)	4,565
Highgate (St Alban the Martyr and St Patrick)	St Alban the Martyr, Highgate (1881)	4,481
Ladywood (St John the Evangelist) (St Peter)	St John the Evangelist, Ladywood (1852)	11,030
Sparkbrook (St Agatha) with Balsall Heath St Barnabas	St Agatha, Sparkbrook (1899); St Barnabas, Balsall Heath (1898)	4,486

=== Deanery of Edgbaston ===
Benefice	Churches	Population served
Bartley Green (St Michael and All Angels)	St Michael & All Angels, Bartley Green (1838)	14,906
Edgbaston (St Augustine)	St Augustine of Hippo, Edgbaston (1867)	8,843
Edgbaston (St Bartholomew)	St Bartholomew, Edgbaston (MED)	9,260
Edgbaston (St George with St Michael) (St Michael's Hall)	St George, Edgbaston (1836)	3,807
Edgbaston (St Germain)	St Germain, Edgbaston (1915)	6,650
Harborne (St Faith and St Laurence)	SS Faith & Laurence, Harborne (1937)	8,784
Harborne (St Peter)	St Peter, Harborne (MED)	10,825
Harborne Heath (St John the Baptist)	St John the Baptist, Harborne	7,080
Quinton Road West (St Boniface)	St Boniface, Quinton	10,198
Quinton, the (Christ Church)	Christ Church, Quinton (1840)	17,361
Selly Oak (St Mary)	St Mary, Selly Oak (1860)	10,893
Summerfield (Christ Church) (Cavendish Road Hall)	Christ Church, Summerfield (1883)	10,745
Weoley Castle (St Gabriel)	St Gabriel, Weoley Castle (1934)	10,216

=== Deanery of Handsworth ===
Benefice	Churches	Population served
Birchfield (Holy Trinity)	Holy Trinity, Birchfield (1863)	17,809
Hamstead (St Bernard)	St Bernard, Hamstead	6,136
Hamstead (St Paul)	St Paul, Hamstead (1865)	14,970
Handsworth (St Andrew)	St Andrew, Handsworth (1894)	31,328
Handsworth (St James)	St James, Handsworth (1838)	31,328
Handsworth (Good News Asian Church) Proprietary Chapel	Good News Asian Church, Handsworth	31,328
Birmingham (Bishop Latimer with All Saints)	Bishop Latimer Memorial, Winson Green (1903)	19,786
Handsworth (St Michael) (St Peter)	St Michael, Handsworth (1851)	19,786
Handsworth (St Mary) Epiphany	St Mary, Handsworth (MED)	14,834
Kingstanding (St Luke)	St Luke, Kingstanding	16,156
Kingstanding (St Mark)	St Mark, Kingstanding (1952)	8,921
Perry Barr (St John the Evangelist)	St John the Evangelist, Perry Barr (1831)	12,242
Perry Beeches (St Matthew)	St Matthew, Perry Beeches (1939)	14,568
Lozells (St Paul and St Silas)	SS Paul & Silas, Lozells	8,042

=== Deanery of King's Norton ===
Benefice	Churches	Population served
Allens Cross (St Bartholomew)	St Bartholomew, Allen's Cross (1938)	14,795
Cofton Hackett (St Michael) with Barnt Green	St Michael & All Angels, Cofton Hackett (MED); St Andrew, Barnt Green	3,569
Cotteridge (St Agnes)	The Cotteridge Church (Meth/CofE/URC) (1898)	4,680
Frankley (St Leonard)	St Leonard, Frankley (MED); St Christopher, Holly Hill	8,427
Kings Norton (St Nicolas)	St Nicolas, Kings Norton (MED); Immanuel, Kings Norton; Hawkesley Church	28,374
Lickey (Holy Trinity)	Holy Trinity, Lickey (1855); St Catherine, Blackwell	4,292
Longbridge (St John the Baptist)	St John the Baptist, Longbridge	9,233
Northfield (St Laurence)	St Laurence, Northfield (MED)	15,713
Rednal (St Stephen the Martyr)	St Stephen the Martyr, Rednal (1951)	7,166
Rubery (St Chad)	St Chad, Rubery (1895)	9,725
Shenley Green (St David)	St David, Shenley Green (1962)	9,165
West Heath (St Anne)	St Anne, West Heath	10,399

=== Deanery of Moseley ===
Benefice	Churches	Population served
Balsall Heath (St Paul) and Edgbaston	St Paul, Balsall Heath (1852); SS Mary & Ambrose, Edgbaston (1891)	18,375
Billesley Common (Holy Cross)	Holy Cross, Billesley Common	9,486
Bournville (St Francis)	St Francis of Assisi, Bournville (1913)	8,062
Brandwood (St Bede)	St Bede, Brandwood	8,996
Hazelwell (St Mary Magdalen)	St Mary Magdalen, Hazelwell	6,496
Highters Heath (Immanuel)	Immanuel, Highters Heath	9,608
Kings Heath (All Saints)	All Saints, King's Heath (1860)	12,613
Moseley (St Agnes)	St Agnes, Moseley (1883)	10,083
Moseley (St Anne) (St Mary)	St Mary, Moseley (MED); St Anne, Moseley (1874)	14,346
Selly Park (Christ Church)	Christ Church, Selly Park (2008)	5,503
Selly Park (St Stephen) (St Wulstan)	St Stephen, Selly Park (1870); St Wulstan, Selly Park	14,099
Stirchley (Ascension)	Ascension, Stirchley (1898)	6,256
Yardley Wood (Christ Church)	Christ Church, Yardley Wood (1848)	10,890

=== Deanery of Shirley ===
Benefice	Churches	Population served
Dorridge (St Philip)	St Philip, Dorridge; St James, Bentley Heath	9,411
Hall Green (Church of the Ascension)	Ascension, Hall Green (1704)	14,839
Hall Green (St Michael)	St Michael, Hall Green	23,505
Hall Green (St Peter)	St Peter, Hall Green (1923)	23,505
Lapworth (St Mary the Virgin)	St Mary the Virgin, Lapworth	1,611
Baddesley Clinton (St Michael)	St Michael, Baddesley Clinton	1,611
Packwood (St Giles) with Hockley Heath	St Giles, Packwood; St Thomas, Nuthurst	2,657
Salter Street (St Patrick)	St Patrick, Salter Street (1840)	12,732
Shirley (St James the Great)	St James the Great, Shirley (1831); St John the Divine, Shirley; Christ the King, Shirley	35,412
Tanworth (St Mary Magdalene)	St Mary Magdalene, Tanworth-in-Arden (MED)	2,460
Wythall (St Mary)	St Mary, Wythall (1862)	9,714

=== Deanery of Warley ===
Benefice	Churches	Population served
Bearwood (St Mary the Virgin)	St Mary the Virgin, Bearwood (1888)	6,811
Blackheath (St Paul)	St Paul, Blackheath (1869)	23,970
Rounds Green (St James)	St James, Rounds Green	23,970
Oldbury (Christ Church), Langley, and Londonderry	Christ Church, Oldbury; St John & Michael, Langley; St Mark, Londonderry	27,664
Rowley Regis (St Giles)	St Giles, Rowley Regis (MED)	17,777
Smethwick (Old Church)	Smethwick Old Church (1732)	8,973
Smethwick (Resurrection) (St Stephen and St Michael)	Holy Trinity, Smethwick (1846)	15,924
Smethwick (St Matthew with St Chad)	St Matthew, Smethwick (1855)	10,199
Warley Woods (St Hilda)	St Hilda, Warley Woods (1906)	10,543

== Safeguarding controversy ==
In December 2018 the diocese was criticised for its use of a Non-disclosure Agreement (NDA) in relation to an abuse case. The survivor described the ten-year process since her first complaint as "haphazard" and claimed she was warned by an unnamed bishop not to talk to the media as it would not be "very godly". The diocese carried out an independent review which delivered damning findings about the handling of her case by the (then) Bishop of Birmingham, David Urquhart, and then forced the survivor to sign the NDA before she was permitted to see the review into her own case. The Archbishop of Canterbury, Justin Welby, had previously questioned the legitimacy of these agreements in March 2018 at the Independent Inquiry into Child Sexual Abuse

A non-disclosure agreement seems to me to be dangerous because it creates suspicion, 'Why are you doing an NDA? Surely you're trying to cover something up'.

The Bishop of Buckingham, Alan Wilson, commenting on the scandal said it was the fourth "corrupt and destructive" non-disclosure agreement (NDA) that had come to his attention since September.

They seem inherently abusive, mainly used to provide a carpet under which to sweep abuse. If people really want them they should be time-limited with reasons.

He said he was unable to share details of the other cases but that some were "complete shockers". The Diocese of Birmingham said the NDA had been used to ensure that those who read the report did not share information provided by other contributors who wanted to remain anonymous. A Church of England spokesperson stated that guidance would be sent to all dioceses to discourage use of these agreements. The bishop and the diocese apologised to the survivor and her husband.

== Companion dioceses ==
The dioceses of Lake Malawi, Northern Malawi, Southern Malawi and Upper Shire in the Church of the Province of Central Africa

== See also ==
- Religion in Birmingham
