= Wood End, Kingsbury, Warwickshire =

Village in Warwickshire, England

Coordinates: 52.582°N 1.643°W

Wood End
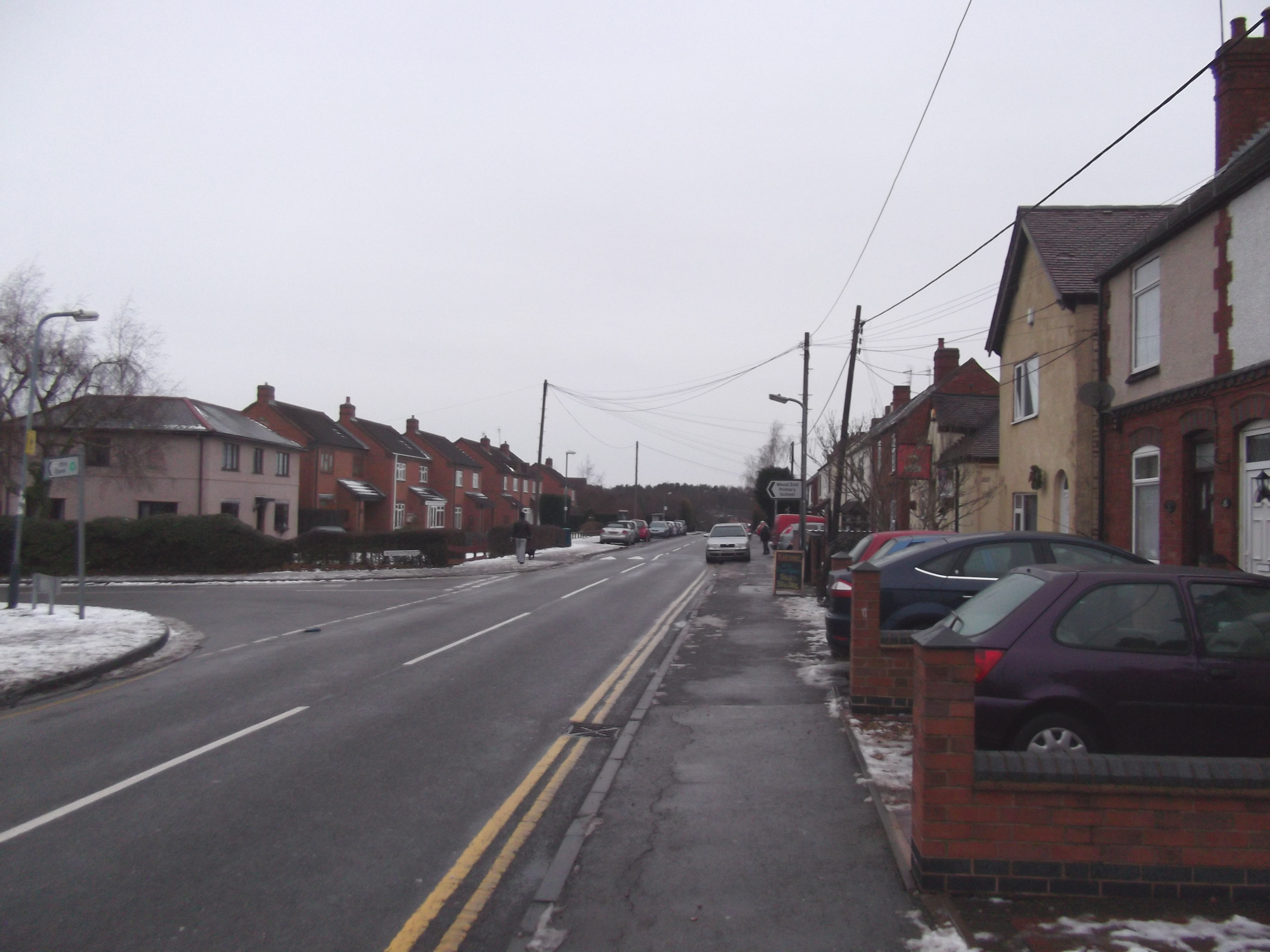
- Tamworth Road in Wood End looking towards Tamworth

- Location within Warwickshire
- Area: 0.28 km^{2} (0.11 sq mi)
- Population: 2,205 (2001)
  - Density: 7,875/km^{2} (20,400/sq mi)
- OS grid reference: SP2498
  - London: 98 mi (158 km) SE
- Civil parish: Kingsbury
- District: North Warwickshire
- Shire county: Warwickshire
- Region: West Midlands
- Country: England
- Sovereign state: United Kingdom
- Post town: Atherstone
- Postcode district: CV9
- Dialling code: 01827
- Police: Warwickshire
- Fire: Warwickshire
- Ambulance: West Midlands
- UK Parliament: North Warwickshire

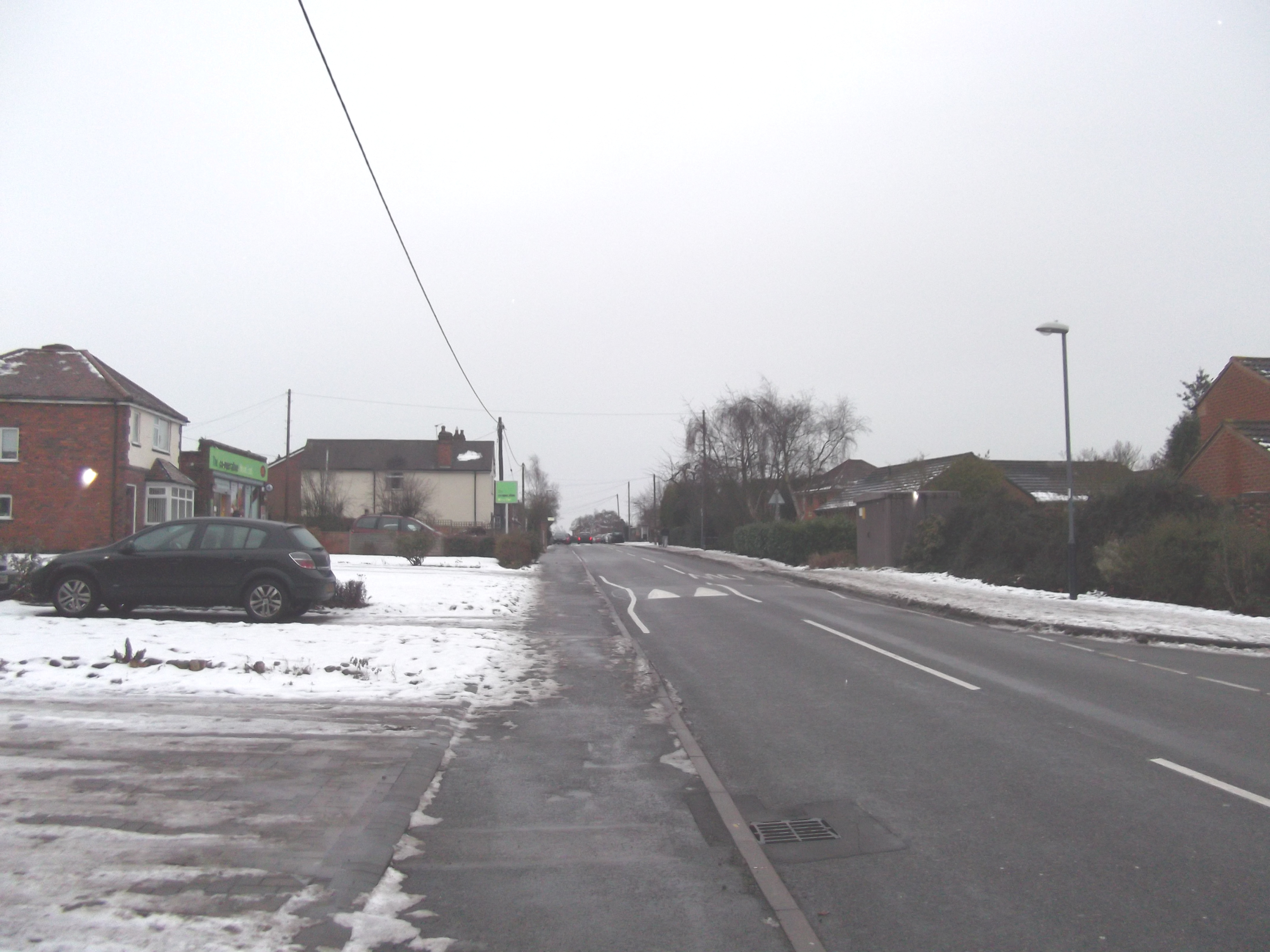
Tamworth Road Looking Towards Hurley

Wood End is a former Pit village in North Warwickshire, England. It lies to the south east of Tamworth and close to the border with Staffordshire. It grew around the former Kingsbury Colliery but now it serves as a commuter village to Tamworth. It has a church, a primary school, a co-operative store, a working men's club and a village hall. The population of Wood End is 2,205, but from the 2011 Census has been included in Kingsbury.

== Name ==
The official name of the village is Wood End, from its founding in 1890, although it is sometimes written as Woodend. The name is derived from the village's position at the end of the nearby Kingsbury Wood, a pine plantation. Parts of the village are still known as Edge Hill. To avoid confusion with other Wood Ends the name of the nearby town, Atherstone is added. The name Wood End, North Warwickshire is sometimes used, but rarely, to avoid confusion with Wood End near Fillongley.

== History ==
The land on which the village was built consisted of fields belonging to two farms, Delves Farm and Poplars Farm, both of which exist today. There were two woods, Edge Hill Wood and Smith's Wood, but only the former survives today. There was also a small settlement of several houses called Edge Hill, and a United Free Methodist Chapel, which closed in the late 1970s. The first houses were built in 1890 to house workers for Kingsbury Colliery, which opened in 1897. A working men's club opened in 1905, and still remains open in the original building. Wood End became a village in 1906 with the opening of the parish church, St Michael & All Angels Church.

A village hall was later built in the 1960s. Also added to the housing stock was Glenville Avenue and Delves Crescent, which were council housing. In the late 1970s Birchfield Close was constructed for private housing, and the village was expanded in 1985 when a new estate, Pinewood Avenue, was built to the west. A school, Wood End Primary School, was opened in 1911. The original school building no longer exists. In 1995 the school was expanded. On 13 August 1998 the older part of the school burnt down, but it has since been rebuilt. During the village's expansion over the years, parts of the village, such as Glenville Avenue (laid out during the 1950s), steadily ate into the surrounding woodland.

Much of the village dates from the 1980s, with the old housing being demolished and replaced. The older housing stock remains on one side of Wood Street, on the Working Mens Club side of Tamworth road (at the top of Wood Street), on Johnson Street, and on part of Smith Street. Meadow View was completed in 2005, which was built on scrub land previously occupied by prefabs. The village has been expanded in 2022 with Brookfields Close off Boulters Lane, then Lewis Avenue off Tamworth Road, in 2024. One of the oldest houses from before it became Wood End, Edge Hill House, was demolished in 2019 for new homes, stood next to where the Methodist chapel was. The site can be seen on the 1884 Ordnance Survey County Series map for Warwickshire along with just a few others.

== Demographics ==
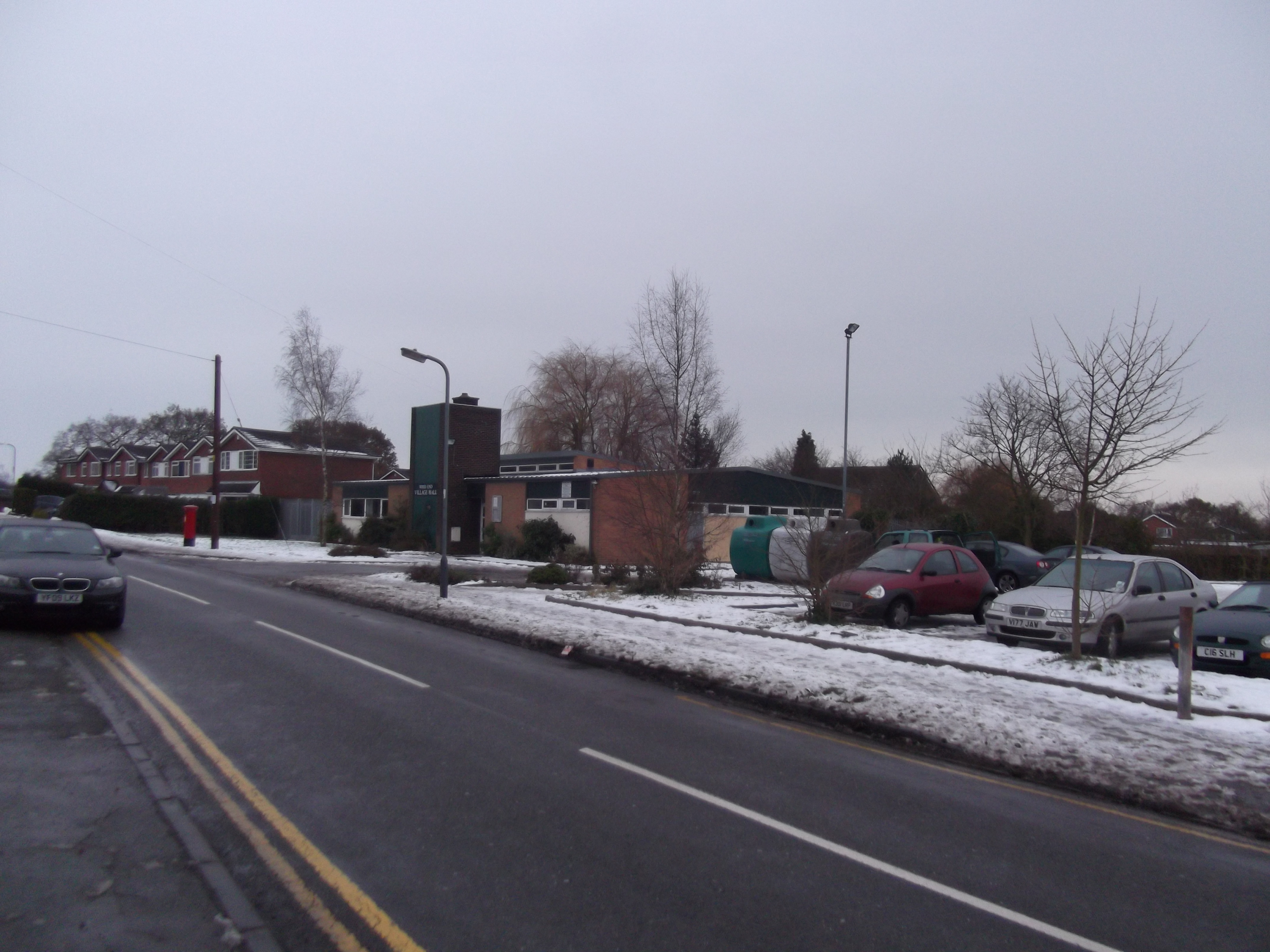
Wood End Village Hall

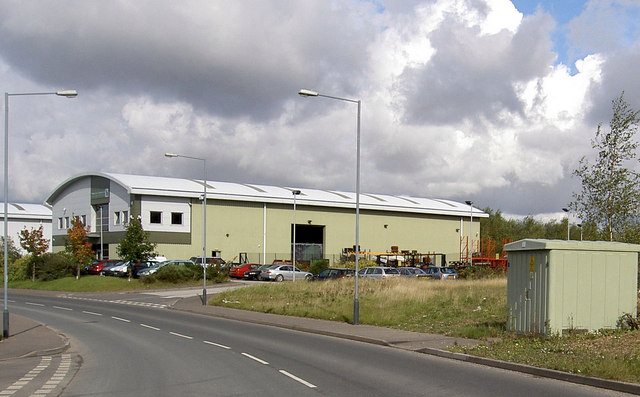
Kingsbury Link Business Park

The population, in 2001, for the 002D (Lower Layer Super Output Area), in which Wood End is the only settlement, was 2,205. According to the 2001 Census the population of the Hurley and Wood End ward was 3,642. Over 99.5% of people (3,550) describe themselves as White British with 89 people from other ethnic groups. The village has 1,820 female inhabitants and 1,822 male inhabitants.

== Geology ==
The village is 110 metres (360 ft) above sea level and is situated on a small hill. The Warwickshire Coalfield underlies the village. Adjacent to Wood End is Kingsbury Wood, which is semi-ancient woodland in parts, part of the former Forest of Arden. Kingsbury Wood has been designated as a Site of Special Scientific Interest. The adjacent Kingsbury Colliery spoil mound is a Local Wildlife Site. Both sites are owned by the Ministry of Defence. Mining tracks used to run through Kingsbury Wood, of which there is still evidence. A small stream arises (Penmire Brook) in Wood End, next to Glenville Avenue, and flows through the centre of the oldest part of the wood into Kingsbury village and eventually outflows into the River Tame. At the lower end of Tamworth Road, a freight line that previously serving the mines at Dordon and Baxterley now serves the rail freight terminal st Birch Coppice Business Park.

== Climate ==
With an average temperature of 11 °C, Wood End has a higher average temperature than most of England.

Climate data for Birmingham
Month	Jan	Feb	Mar	Apr	May	Jun	Jul	Aug	Sep	Oct	Nov	Dec	Year
Record high °C (°F)	13 (55)	16 (61)	21 (70)	24 (75)	29 (84)	31 (88)	31 (88)	33 (91)	27 (81)	25 (77)	19 (66)	14 (57)	33 (91)
Mean daily maximum °C (°F)	5 (41)	6 (43)	9 (48)	12 (54)	16 (61)	19 (66)	20 (68)	20 (68)	17 (63)	13 (55)	9 (48)	6 (43)	20 (68)
Mean daily minimum °C (°F)	2 (36)	2 (36)	3 (37)	5 (41)	7 (45)	10 (50)	12 (54)	12 (54)	10 (50)	7 (45)	5 (41)	3 (37)	2 (36)
Record low °C (°F)	−12 (10)	−9 (16)	−7 (19)	−2 (28)	−1 (30)	3 (37)	6 (43)	6 (43)	3 (37)	−2 (28)	−4 (25)	−6 (21)	−12 (10)
Average precipitation mm (inches)	74 (2.9)	54 (2.1)	50 (2.0)	53 (2.1)	64 (2.5)	50 (2.0)	69 (2.7)	69 (2.7)	61 (2.4)	69 (2.7)	84 (3.3)	67 (2.6)	764 (30.1)
Source: BBC Weather

== Governance ==
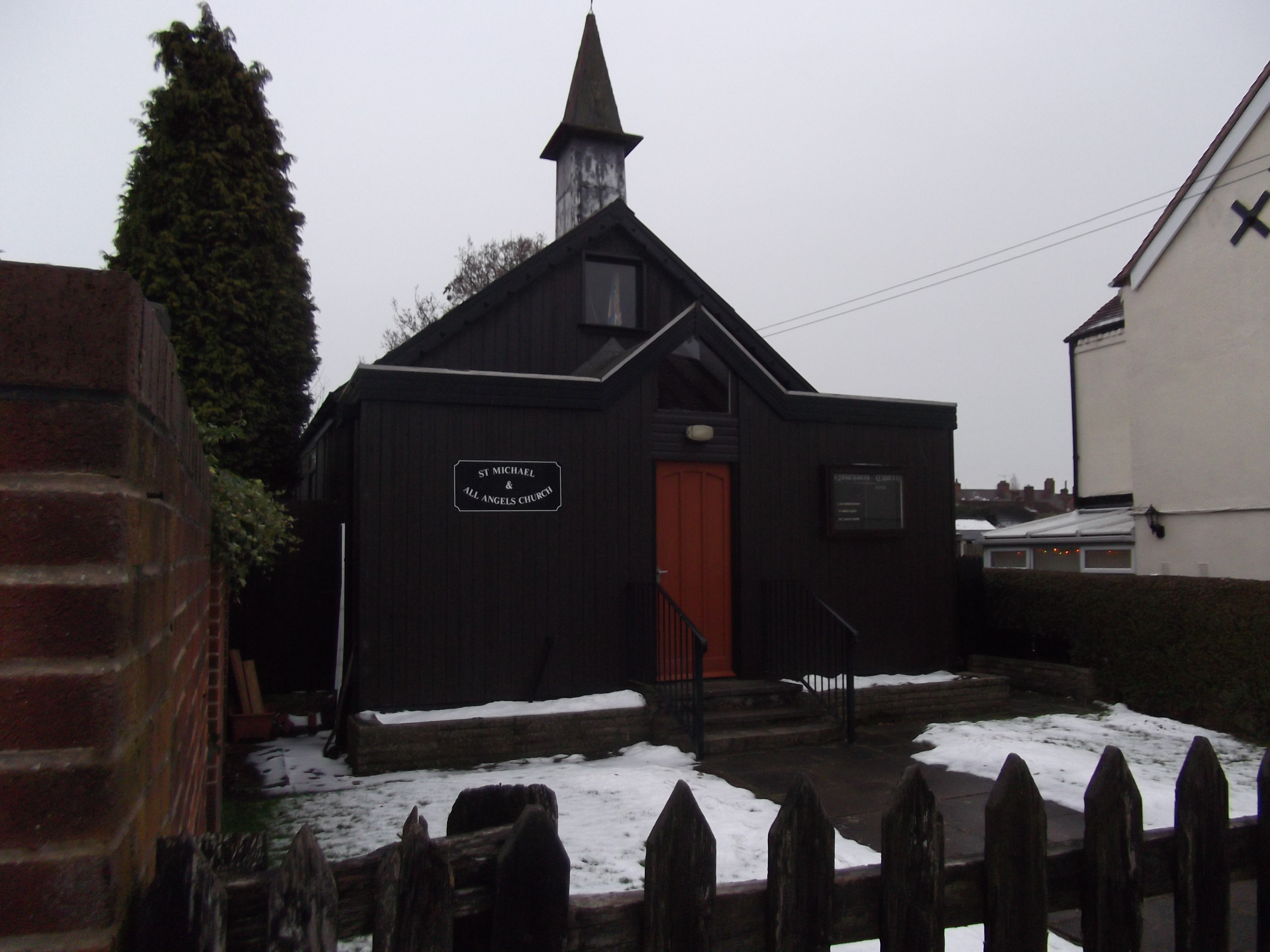
St Michael & All Angels Church on Smith Street

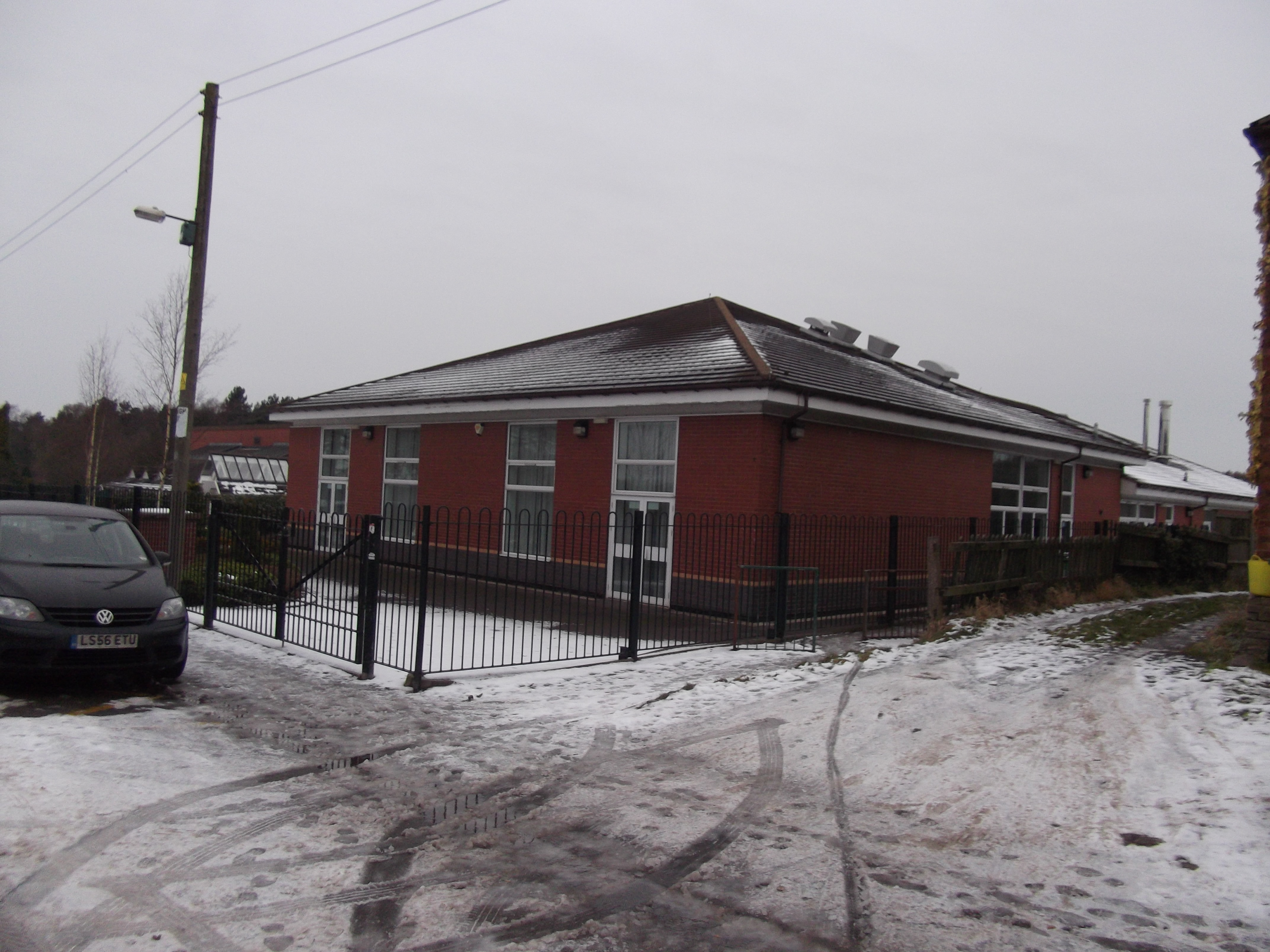
Wood End Primary School

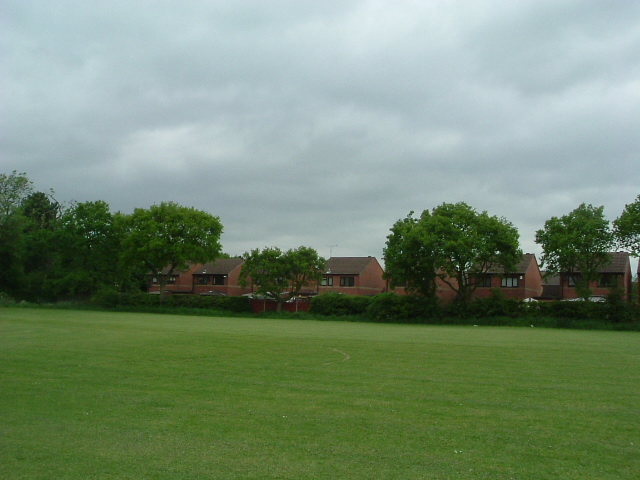
The Playing Field on Smith Street

The village is part of the Kingsbury civil parish. When the village was built in 1890 it was part of the Tamworth Rural Sanitary District. In 1894, under the Local Government Act 1894, it became part of the newly formed Tamworth Rural District. In 1965 the Tamworth Rural District was abolished and Wood End became part of the Atherstone Rural District. In 1974 under the Local Government Act 1972 the Atherstone Rural District became part of the newly formed district of North Warwickshire. Wood End is part of the Hurley and Wood End Ward, which is represented (2011) by Ann Lewis and Hayden Philips, both Labour. As the ward is an old mining community it is considered a Labour safe seat. Wood End is covered by the Kingsbury Ward in Warwickshire County Council and is represented by the Labour Brian Moss. It is part of the North Warwickshire parliamentary constituency and the current MP is Conservative Craig Tracey. Prior to Brexit in 2020 it was part of the West Midlands in the European Parliament.

== Economy ==
There is a Co-operative store and post office that is part of the Tamworth Co-operative Society, a garage on Tamworth Road, and a hairdressers in Wood Street. Just outside the village there is a factory owned by the Swedish flooring manufacturer Pergo and Planters garden centre. Between Wood End and Piccadilly is Kingsbury Link Business Park. Until 1968 the majority of employed people living in the village worked in nearby collieries. Today the majority of those in employment work in Tamworth, with some working in Birmingham and Coventry, with manufacturing being the most common type of employment, followed by wholesale and retail. For the ward of Hurley and Wood End out of 2,629 people 1,791 describe themselves as Economically active and 838 describe themselves as Economically inactive and 274 are retired with the most common number of hours worked per week 38 to 48 hours.

== Crime ==
In 2009 the crime rate was 3.6 crimes per 1,000 people for the ward of Hurley and Wood End. During the same period the crime rate for the borough of North Warwickshire was 5 crimes per 1,000 people. In 2010 the figure for Hurley and Wood End had decreased to 3 crimes per 1,000 people. The most common type of crime is anti-social behaviour. In May 2011 there were 9 reports of criminal activity. In June 2011 there were 12 reports. In July 2011 there were 25 reported crimes in the village with 10 reports of anti-social behaviour and 9 reports of burglary. Wood End is part of the North Warwickshire West Neighbourhood Policing Team, based in Coleshill, with the station in Atherstone, which has 7 officers and 3 PCSOs.

== Health ==
The village lies in the North Warwickshire NHS trust area. The village does not have its own doctor's surgery or pharmacy. For the ward of Hurley and Wood End in 2001, of 3,642 inhabitants 2,409 described their health as good, 914 described their health as fairly good and 319 described their health as poor. In the ward there were 215 Disability living allowance claimants in 2009.

== Public services ==
Waste collection services are provided by North Warwickshire Borough Council. Water and sewage services are provided by Severn Trent Water, and the Sewage Treatment Works is in Dordon. The distribution network operator for electricity is Central Networks better known as E.ON UK. Unlike most villages in the area it uses a Coventry (CV) postcode rather than a Birmingham (B) postcode. There is a sub-post office located inside the Co-op. The Postal Town is Atherstone. The nearest library is located in Dordon. Wood End uses the Tamworth 01827 area code. The nearest police and fire stations are in Atherstone. Wood End is part of Warwickshire Police, Warwickshire Fire and Rescue Service and West Midlands Ambulance Service.

== Religion ==
According to the 2001 census the population of the village is 80% Christian, 19% Non-Religious and 1% Other. Although St Michael & All Angels Church is the parish church, many of the residents attend other nearby Anglican churches such as the Church of the Resurrection in Hurley or St. Mary The Church of Our Lady in Merevale. Wood End lies within the Roman Catholic parish of St. John the Baptist, with the main collegiate church being St. John's Presbytery in Tamworth. St Michael & All Angels is a small wooden church on Smith Street, built in 1906. Today it is the only place of worship in the village, part of the Kingsbury and Baxterley group of churches along with Kingsbury, Baxterley, Merevale and Hurley, all of which share the same vicar. Previously there was a small United Methodist chapel in Edge Hill, in existence before the village was built. It was closed some time in the late 1970s, and later demolished. The site is now occupied by a private house. Baxterley Church is nearer to Wood End than it is to the village of Baxterley. It is also part of the Kingsbury and Baxterley Group of churches.

== Education ==
According to the 2001 Census for the ward of Hurley and Wood End, 1,068 adults had no educational qualifications and 1,560 adults had level 1 or higher qualifications. There is a primary school on Wood Street, which is also used for children from surrounding villages such as Piccadilly.

== Culture and recreation ==
The village does not have its own public house, but there is a working men's club on Tamworth Road which was opened in 1905. It was used by miners, farm labourers and clay workers, and helped to support the Wood End Silver Band. There is also a village hall dating from the 1960s. The village does not have any takeaways or restaurants, with the nearest one being in the village of Hockley. There is a large playing field, football pitch and play area at the end of Smith Street. As of 2009, a lottery funded 'North Warwickshire Forest of Arden' walking trail was established with the route including a north-eastern part of Wood End (through its fields). The nearest leisure facilities are in Kingsbury School, and the Snowdome in Tamworth. There is a football club in the Tamworth & District Sunday Football League called Wood End Sports.

== Transport ==
Wood End lies close to junction 10 of the M42, and is 2 miles from the A5 (Watling Street) at Dordon. The village has 4 bus stops along Tamworth Road, which are served by buses running on routes 777, 767, 115, 118 and 119. The nearest railway station is Wilnecote. The nearest airports are Birmingham (17 miles) and East Midlands (25 miles).

== Media ==
The local newspapers covering the area are the Tamworth Herald, which has a separate edition for North Warwickshire, and the Atherstone Recorder. The local BBC radio station covering the area is BBC CWR. Local commercial stations in the area include Hits Radio Coventry & Warwickshire and Capital Mid-Counties. The village is covered by the ITV Central and BBC West Midlands TV regions which are broadcast from the nearby Sutton Coldfield transmitting station.
