= Atherstone Rural District =

Defunct local authority in Warwickshire, England

Coordinates: 52.57°N 1.55°W

Atherstone
- Area
  - 1901: 21,330 acres (86.3 km^{2})
  - 1961: 21,945 acres (88.8 km^{2})
- Population
  - 1901: 16,356
  - 1971: 38,596
- History
  - Created: 1894
  - Abolished: 1974
  - Succeeded by: North Warwickshire
- Status: Rural district
  - HQ: Atherstone

Atherstone Rural District was located in the administrative county of Warwickshire, England, from 1894 to 1974. It was named after its main town and administrative headquarters of Atherstone.

Over the years the district gained territory on the abolition of neighbouring rural districts. In 1932, it gained part of Nuneaton Rural District and in 1965 it gained most of Tamworth Rural District.

As with all rural districts, Atherstone RD was abolished in 1974 (by the Local Government Act 1972) and was merged with part of the Meriden Rural District to form the new non-metropolitan district of North Warwickshire.

== Civil parishes ==
Over the eighty years of its existence, the rural district contained the following civil parishes:

- Ansley
- Atherstone
- Austrey (from 1965)†
- Baddesley Ensor
- Baxterley
- Bentley
- Caldecote (from 1932)‡
- Dordon (created 1948 from part of Polesworth CP)
- Grendon
- Hartshill
- Kingsbury (from 1965)†
- Mancetter
- Merevale
- Newton Regis (from 1965)†
- Oldbury
- Polesworth
- Seckington (from 1965)†
- Shuttington (from 1965)†

† previously in Tamworth Rural District

‡ previously in Nuneaton Rural District
