= Merevale =

Village in Warwickshire, England

Coordinates: 52.57656°N 1.57282°W

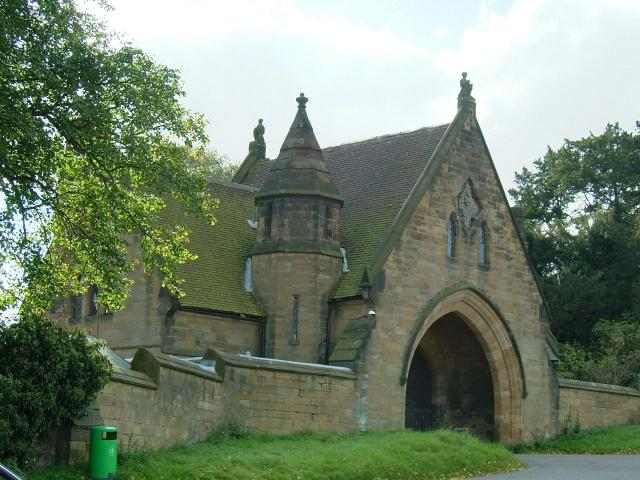
- The Gatehouse to Merevale estate in Merevale Lane. The building and the Church of Our Lady behind it were originally part of the Cistercian Merevale Abbey complex.

- Location within Warwickshire
- Population: 181 (2011)
- OS grid reference: SP2997
- Civil parish: Merevale
- District: North Warwickshire
- Shire county: Warwickshire
- Region: West Midlands
- Country: England
- Sovereign state: United Kingdom
- Post town: Atherstone
- Postcode district: CV9
- Dialling code: 01827
- Police: Warwickshire
- Fire: Warwickshire
- Ambulance: West Midlands
- UK Parliament: North Warwickshire

Merevale is a small village and civil parish in the North Warwickshire district of the county of Warwickshire in England. Located about one and a half miles west of Atherstone, it is the site of a medieval Cistercian Abbey (founded in 1148) and Merevale Hall (built in 1840 and home to the Dugdale family).

== Merevale Abbey ==
An abbey was built in Merevale in 1148 by Robert de Ferrers. It was a relatively small abbey with only around 10 monks. The abbey was dissolved in October 1538, during the reign of Henry VIII and fell into ruin, but traces of it remain to the present day. One of the most significant parts to have survived is the gate chapel, now used as St. Mary The Church of Our Lady Merevale. The church is significant for its Cistercian stained glass, including its Jesse window (one of the most important in the British Isles), and for being the only Cistercian gate chapel to be open for regular weekly services throughout the year. William de Ferrers is buried here.

== Merevale Hall ==
Designed by Edward Blore, Merevale Hall was completed in 1840 and has been the home of the descendants of Sir William Dugdale since this time. Dugdale was a strong royalist supporter of King Charles I during the English Civil War, and was appointed as his 'Garter Principal King of Arms'. Many of his artefacts, including ceremonial clothes, can be seen at the hall.

== Governance ==
The village has its own parish called Merevale Civil Parish although for some purposes it is merged to form Bentley and Merevale Civil Parish. The community is served by Bentley and Merevale Parish Council. Merevale was part of the Atherstone Rural District. In 1974 under the Local Government Act 1972 the Atherstone Rural District became part of the newly formed district of North Warwickshire. Inside North Warwickshire Merevale is part of the Baddesley Ensor and Grendon Ward and is represented by Andy Wright and Bernadette Davey who are both Conservative, Merevale is covered by the Baddesley Ensor Ward in Warwickshire and is also represented by Andy Wright a Conservative Councillor. It is part of the North Warwickshire and Bedworth constituency and the current MP is Rachel Taylor of the Labour Party. Prior to Brexit in 2020 it was part of the West Midlands European Parliament constituency which was represented by 6 MEPs.

== Public services ==
Waste collection services are provided by North Warwickshire Borough Council. Water and sewage services are provided by Severn Trent Water. The distribution network operator for electricity is Central Networks better known as E.ON UK. Merevale has a Coventry (CV) postcode. The postal town is Atherstone which is also the location of the nearest post office. The nearest library is also in Atherstone. Merevale uses the Tamworth 01827 area code.

The nearest police and fire stations are in Atherstone. Atherstone is part of Warwickshire Police, Warwickshire Fire and Rescue Service and West Midlands Ambulance Service. The village lies in the North Warwickshire NHS trust area. The village does not have its own doctor's surgery or pharmacy. The nearest GP's surgeries can be found in Atherstone. The George Eliot Hospital at Nuneaton is the area's local hospital. It has an Accident and Emergency Department. Out of hours GP services are also based at George Eliot.

== Transport ==
The A5 runs to the east of Merevale. The village has one bus stop on the A5 and is served by routes 48 and 765. The nearest railway station is Atherstone. The nearest airports are Birmingham and East Midlands.

== Media ==
The local newspapers covering the area are the Tamworth Herald, which has a separate edition for North Warwickshire and the Atherstone Recorder. The local BBC radio station covering the area is BBC CWR. Local commercial stations in the area include Hits Radio Coventry & Warwickshire and Capital Mid-Counties. The village is covered by the Central ITV and BBC West Midlands TV regions broadcast from the nearby Sutton Coldfield transmitting station.
