= Holy Trinity Church, Smethwick =

Holy Trinity Church
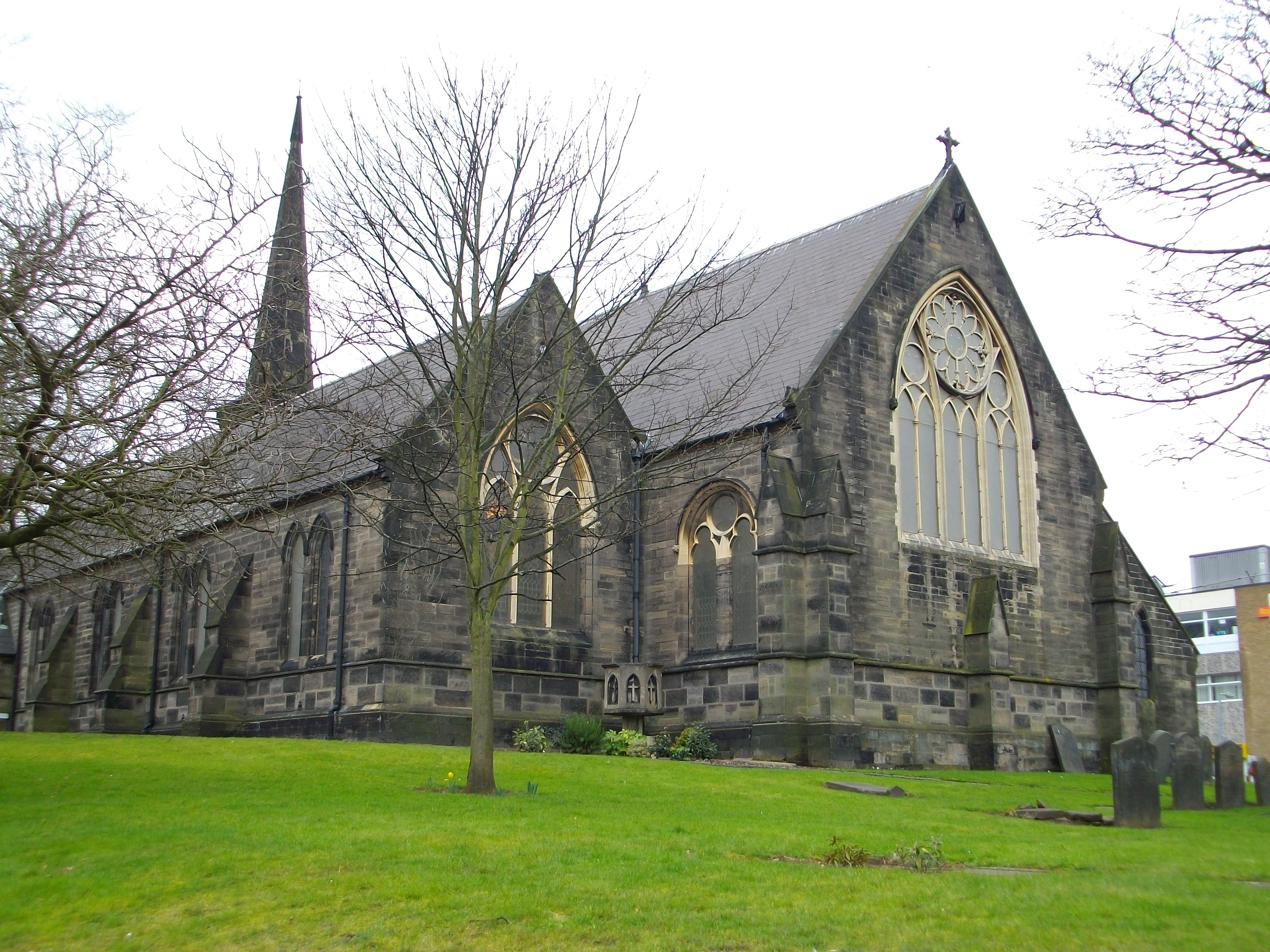
- Holy Trinity Church
- 52°29′41.233″N 1°58′16.817″W
- OS grid reference: SP 02043 88542
- Location: Smethwick, West Midlands
- Country: England
- Denomination: Church of England
- Website: holytrinitysmethwick.co.uk

History
- Consecrated: 1838

Architecture
- Heritage designation: Grade II
- Designated: 29 September 1987

Administration
- Diocese: Birmingham

Holy Trinity Church is an Anglican church in Smethwick, West Midlands, England, and in the Diocese of Birmingham. The building is Grade II listed. The church dates originally from 1837, and was rebuilt on a larger scale in 1889.

== History and description ==
Before Holy Trinity Church was built, there was a chapel of ease, consecrated in 1732, in the parish of St Peter's Church, Harborne. It was afterwards known as the Old Chapel, or Smethwick Old Church. It is the oldest surviving building in Smethwick.

The population of north Smethwick was growing in the early 19th century, and the opening of the New Main Line of the Birmingham Canal in the late 1820s was a factor in the creation of new factories and housing. Holy Trinity Church, planned in 1835, was built in 1837, and consecrated in 1838. It was designed by Thomas Johnson of Lichfield in Early English style; it was built of Tixall stone, had a cruciform plan, and on the west an embattled tower and spire. In 1842 the parish of North Harborne was created for the church, from part of the Harborne parish.

The church was mostly rebuilt in 1887 to 1889, on a larger scale, to the designs of Francis Bacon of Newbury. The tower and spire remained from the original building. It is built of sandstone ashlar with limestone dressings. The nave and chancel are under a continuous roof. There are north and south aisles under separate roofs; they have five bays, and paired lancet windows.

In the churchyard is an outdoor pulpit erected in 1913. J. H. Newsham, vicar of Holy Trinity from 1912 to 1914, preached here to a men's organisation which he founded, "The Brotherhood".

In 1975, new facilities were created including a foyer, kitchen and toilet facilities, and there was a reduction in seating. The pews were later replaced by new seating.
