= Church of St Peter & St Paul, Kingsbury =

Church in Warwickshire, England

St Peter & St Paul
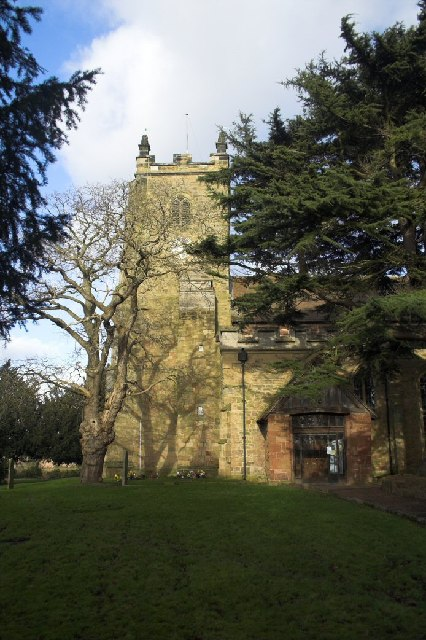
- The Church Tower
- St Peter & St Paul
- 52.5638°N 1.6847°W
- Denomination: Church of England
- Churchmanship: Anglican
- Website: Kingsbury And Baxterley Churches

Administration
- Province: Province of Canterbury
- Diocese: Diocese of Birmingham

Clergy
- Vicar: Revd. Dr. John White

The Church of St Peter & St Paul is a Church of England parish church in the village of Kingsbury, Warwickshire, England. It is the only Church of England church in the parish and it dates from the 12th century

== History ==
The church was built around the year 1200, when the church was built and until the 19th century the village was just a small hamlet, it was surrounded by land once owned by Prime Minister Sir Robert Peel.

The churchyard contains the war grave of a Royal Engineers soldier of World War II.

== Present day ==
The church is part of the Diocese of Birmingham and the Deanery of Polesworth. It is the main church in the Kingsbury and Baxterley group of churches along with Baxterley, Merevale, Hurley and Wood End, All five are currently in vacancy, but from 8 October 2014, the new Priest-in-Charge will be the Revd. Dr. John White.
