= Baxterley =

Village in Warwickshire, England

Coordinates: 52.570°N 1.591°W

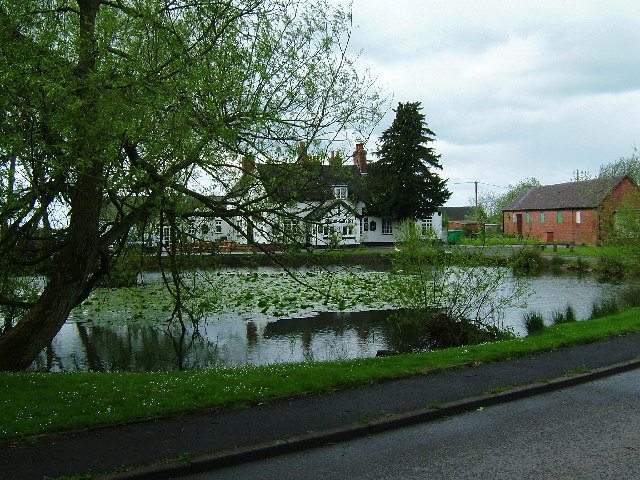
- The Rose Inn

- Location within Warwickshire
- Population: 340 (2021)
- OS grid reference: SP 278 970
- Civil parish: Baxterley
- District: North Warwickshire
- Shire county: Warwickshire
- Region: West Midlands
- Country: England
- Sovereign state: United Kingdom
- Post town: Atherstone
- Postcode district: CV9
- Dialling code: 01827
- Police: Warwickshire
- Fire: Warwickshire
- Ambulance: West Midlands
- UK Parliament: North Warwickshire

Baxterley is a small village and civil parish in the North Warwickshire district of Warwickshire in England. According to the 2001 Census, it had a population of 335, reducing to 328 at the 2011 Census, increasing to 340 at the 2021 Census. The village is about two miles west of Atherstone and is home to Jaguar Land Rover's national distribution centre.

== History ==
Baxterley has been in existence since Saxon times but is not mentioned in the Domesday Book. Baxterley Hall was built by John Glover in 1548, and demolished in 1849. It is thought that the original village site was built up around the church, quite some distance away from the current village and was mainly a centre for agricultural dwellings and working. The opening of the mine resulted in a gradual migration of the labour force some 2 miles or so down the road, so that nowadays there are just a few isolated cottages and houses close to the church and the majority of the village has effectively relocated to its present position.

Baddesley and Baxterley Colliery was the major employer in the area, from its opening in 1850, to its closure in 1989. It was the site of one of the worst pit disasters in the Midlands, where a coal dust explosion in 1882 lead to the deaths of 32 men, including the owner, William Dugdale of Merevale Hall. There is a memorial to those who lost their lives in the pit in the nave of the church. the mine closed in 1989 and remained derelict for many years until the remaining pit buildings on the Main Road were refurbished and converted into offices.

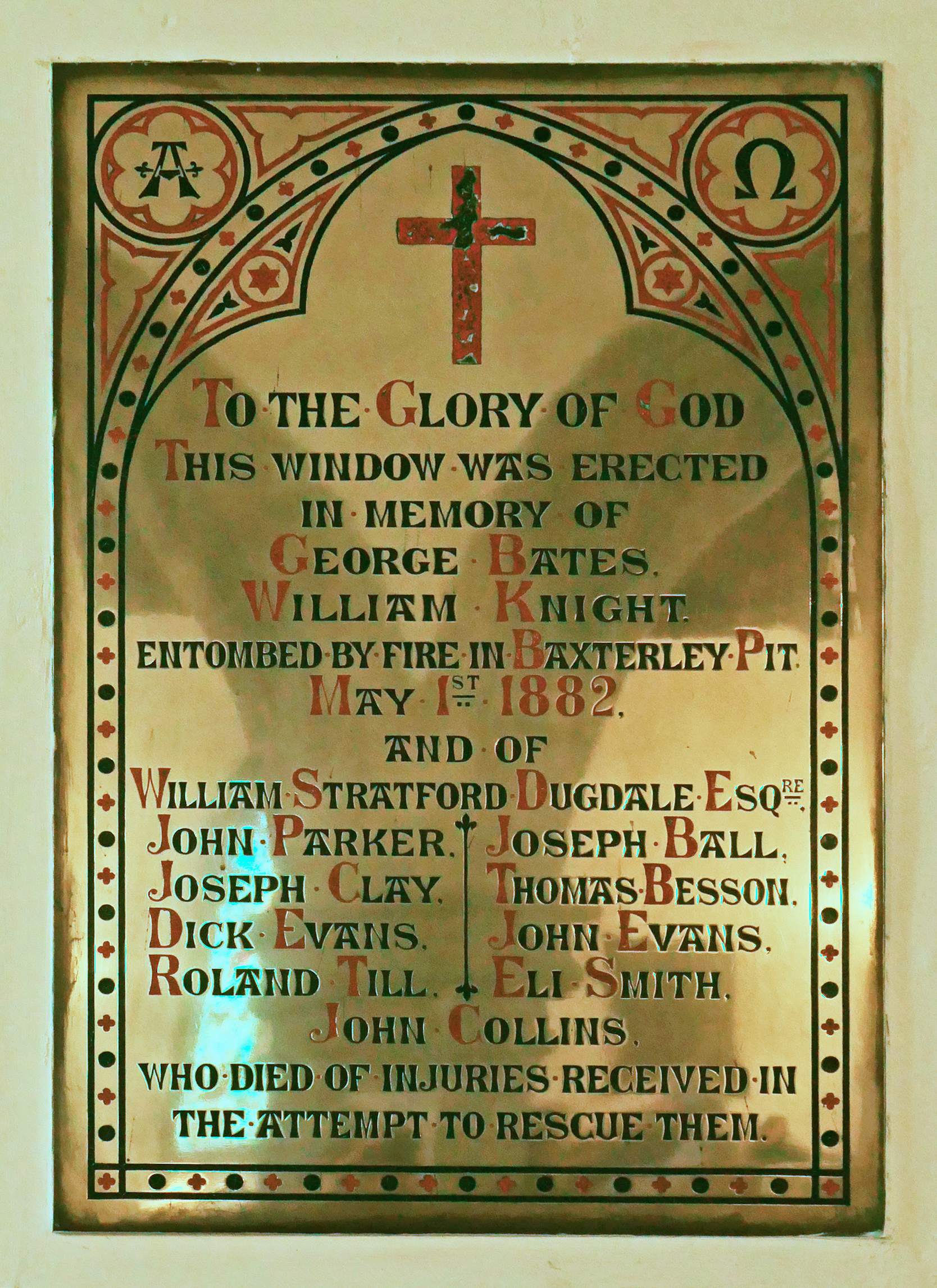
Memorial to Baxterley Pit Disaster

== Crime ==
In 2009 there was an average of 2.2 crimes per 1,000 people for the ward of Baddesley and Grendon, and during the same period there were 5 crimes per head for the borough of North Warwickshire. In 2010 the figure was up to 3.3 crimes per head. The most common type of crime is anti-social behaviour.

== Health ==
The village lies in the North Warwickshire NHS trust area. The village does not have its own doctor's surgery or pharmacy. The nearest GP's surgeries can be found in Baddesley Ensor and Hurley. The George Eliot Hospital at Nuneaton is the area's local hospital. It has an Accident and Emergency Department. Out of hours GP services are also based at George Eliot.

== Religion ==
For the ward of Baddesley and Grendon 82% describe themselves as Christian and 18% describe themselves as non-religious with less than 1% of people describing themselves as other. Baxterley Church, a church in the Polesworth Deanery of the Diocese of Birmingham, it is about 1.7 miles from the village and the nearest village to it is Wood End. It is part of the Kingsbury and Baxterley Group of churches.

== Education ==
There has never been any educational establishments in the village. The nearest primary schools are in the nearby villages of Baddesley Ensor, Hurley and Wood End. The nearest secondary school is situated in Atherstone.

== Governance ==
The village is a Civil Parish in its own Right. The village was originally part of the Atherstone Rural District. In 1974 under the Local Government Act 1972 it became part of the newly formed district of North Warwickshire. Inside North Warwickshire it is part of the Baddesley Ensor and Grendon ward, both councillors are currently Conservatives. It is part of the North Warwickshire constituency and the current MP is Conservative Craig Tracey.

== Public Services ==
The village does not have any takeaways or restaurants, with the nearest one being in Atherstone. Water and sewage services are provided by Severn Trent Water. The Postal Town is Atherstone. The nearest police and fire stations are in Atherstone. There is a Public House known as the Rose Inn. Outside the front of The Rose and next to the village pond is half of the original winding wheel from the mine, mounted on a plinth. The nearest Leisure centre is in Atherstone.

== Transport ==
Baxterley lies close to the A5 near Atherstone. The village has 2 bus stops along Main road served by route 777, and the nearest railway station is Atherstone. The nearest airport is Birmingham (15 miles). Baxterley Aerodrome is a small grass-strip airfield with a single runway located to the west of village. It hosts several air shows throughout the year.

== Media ==
The local newspaper covering the area is the Atherstone Recorder. Local radio includes BBC CWR, Hits Radio Coventry & Warwickshire and Capital Mid-Counties. The village is covered by the Central ITV and BBC West Midlands TV regions.
