= Dordon =

Village in Warwickshire, England

Coordinates: 52°36′05″N 1°36′52″W

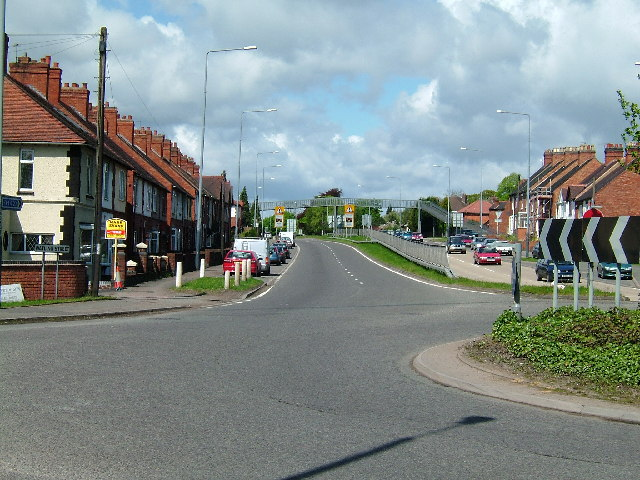
- The A5 through Dordon.

- Location within Warwickshire
- Population: 3,216 (2021)
- OS grid reference: SK2600
  - London: 99 mi (159 km) SE
- Civil parish: Dordon
- District: North Warwickshire
- Shire county: Warwickshire
- Region: West Midlands
- Country: England
- Sovereign state: United Kingdom
- Post town: Tamworth
- Postcode district: B78
- Dialling code: 01827
- Police: Warwickshire
- Fire: Warwickshire
- Ambulance: West Midlands
- UK Parliament: North Warwickshire

Dordon is a village and civil parish in the North Warwickshire district of the county of Warwickshire in England and close to the border with Staffordshire. The village is located on the A5 national route and is contiguous with the larger village of Polesworth. Other nearby places include Tamworth, Atherstone, Grendon, Wood End Village, Baddesley Ensor and Nuneaton. In 2021 the population for the parish of Dordon was 3,216.

== History ==
Dordon was just a row of houses until the opening of Birch Coppice mine and it has grown since then. There was a notable growth in the village in 1920 and Dordon became a civil parish in its own right on 1 April 1948,

Since the late-1990s, two of the Midlands' largest business/distribution parks (namely Birch Coppice and Core 42) have continued to expand into the countryside north of the village, including the UK head office/national hub for the United Parcel Service (UPS).

== Governance ==
The village has its own parish council. Dordon is part of North Warwickshire in the Dordon Ward, Dordon is represented by Cllr Byron Melia and Cllr Davina Ridley of Dordon Independent Party in North Warwickshire borough elections. Cllr Andrew Wright is the conservative candidate for the county council. It was part of the West Midlands European Parliament constituency which was represented by 6 MEPs.

== Public services ==
Waste collection services are provided by North Warwickshire Borough Council. Water and sewage services are provided by Severn Trent Water and the Sewage Treatment Works is in on the edge of Dordon. The distribution network operator for electricity is Central Networks, better known as E.ON UK. Unlike most villages in the area it uses a Birmingham (B) postcode rather than a Coventry (CV) postcode, due to its close proximity to Tamworth. There is a small sub-post office located in the Co-Operative store on New Street, and the postal town is Tamworth (in Staffordshire). Dordon has its own library, formerly operated by Warwickshire County Council. but now run by volunteers belonging to the group "Readers of Roman Way".

== Crime ==
The nearest police station is in Atherstone and the nearest fire station is in Polesworth. In 2009 there was an average of 5.1 crimes per 1,000 people for the ward of Hurley and Wood End, and during the same period there were 5 crimes per head for the borough of North Warwickshire. In 2010 the figure was up to 5.8 crimes per head. The most common type of crime is anti-social behaviour. In January 2011 there were 19 reported crimes in Dordon

== Health ==
Dordon lies in the North Warwickshire NHS trust area. Dordon has its own GPs called Dordon Surgery. The George Eliot Hospital at Nuneaton is the area's local hospital. It has an Accident and Emergency Department. Out of hours GP services are also based at George Eliot.

== Education ==
In terms of further education the area is served by North Warwickshire and Hinckley College at Nuneaton. There is also Tamworth and Lichfield College. Dordon has 2 primary schools; one called Dordon community primary school and the other called Birchwood primary school. Despite being named after Polesworth, Dordon has a secondary school called The Polesworth School which is attended by students from the ages of 12–18.

== Religion ==
According to the 2001 Census for the parish of Dordon 2,568 describe themselves as Christian and 629 are non-religious. There are also 4 Buddhists, 9 Muslims, 13 Sikhs and 3 people describe their religion as other. Dordon's Church of England Parish church is called St Leonard Church and was built in 1868. It is in the parish of St Leonard along with St Mary church in nearby Freasley. Dordon also has a small Congregational Church on Long Street, Which is simply called Dordon Congregational Church.

== Transport ==
Dordon lies close to the M42 at junction 10 and the A5 (Watling Street) runs through Dordon. The village has many bus stops along dotted around and is served by route 765 and the newly introduced 766. The nearest railway station is Polesworth. but this is now limited to one service northbound to Crewe in the weekdays so rail links are better placed to be made in Tamworth or Atherstone. The nearest airports are Birmingham (12 miles) and East Midlands (20 miles).

== Media ==
The local newspapers covering the area are the Tamworth Herald, which has a separate edition for North Warwickshire and the Atherstone Recorder. Local radio includes BBC CWR, Hits Radio Coventry & Warwickshire and Capital Mid-Counties. The village is covered by the Central ITV and BBC West Midlands TV regions broadcast from the nearby Sutton Coldfield transmitting station.
