= St Mary The Church of Our Lady, Merevale =

Coordinates: 52.57656°N 1.57282°W

St Mary's Church, Merevale
- The Church of Our Lady, Merevale
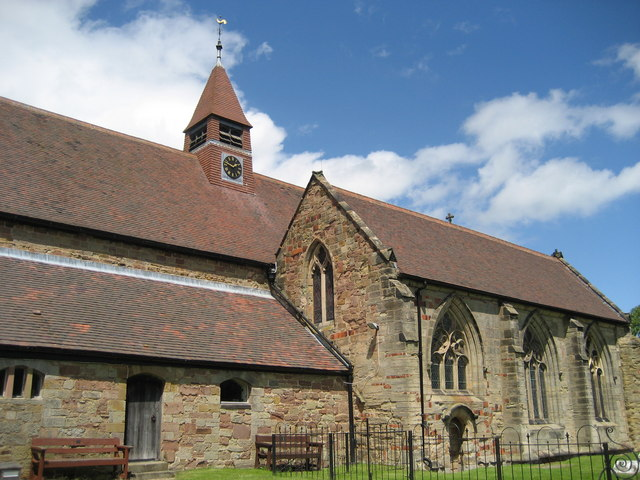
- St Mary's Church, Merevale
- Denomination: Church of England
- Churchmanship: Anglican
- Website: Kingsbury And Baxterley Churches

History
- Dedication: St Mary (mother of Jesus)

Administration
- Province: Province of Canterbury
- Diocese: Diocese of Birmingham

Clergy
- Vicar: Revd. Dr. John White

St. Mary The Church of Our Lady Merevale, is a historic parish church in Merevale, Warwickshire is known for its Jesse window. Originally, it was part of Merevale Abbey, but now is a Church of England parish church.

== History ==
The Church was originally the gatehouse to the much larger Merevale Abbey that was founded in 1148 and was a Cistercestan Abbey was destroyed in the Dissolution of the Monasteries by Henry VIII. Some traces of it remain today. The Gatehouse survived and became a Church of England parish church.

== Burials at Merevale Abbey ==
- John de Ferrers, 4th Baron Ferrers of Chartley
- Robert de Ferrers, 1st Earl of Derby
- Robert de Ferrers, 2nd Earl of Derby
- Robert de Ferrers, 5th Baron Ferrers of Chartley
- William de Ferrers, 5th Earl of Derby

== Today ==
It is part of the Kingsbury and Baxterley group of churches along with Baxterley, Kingsbury, Hurley and Wood End, All five share the same Priest in Charge who is currently Revd. Dr John White.

It is the only church in the parish of Merevale with Bentley which has 4 exclaves (2 near Twycross, 1 near Sheepy Parva Both in Leicestershire and one in Hams Hall in Warwickshire).

It is part of the Deanery of Polesworth, Which is Part of the Arch Deanery of Aston.

It is the only Cistercian Gate Chapel to be open for regular weekly services throughout the year in the United Kingdom.
