= Baxterley Church =

Coordinates: 52.570581°N 1.623397°W

The Church
- The Church, Baxterley
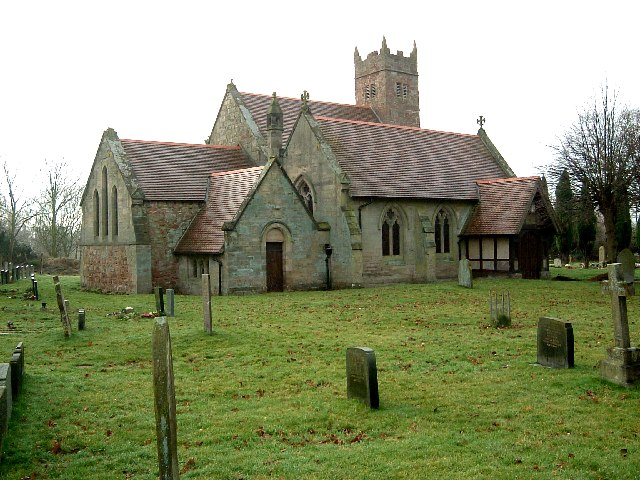

- Location in Warwickshire
- OS grid reference: SP 256 970
- Location: Wood End, Warwickshire
- Country: England
- Denomination: Church of England
- Website: Kingsbury And Baxterley Churches

Specifications
- Length: 10.5 metres (34 ft)
- Width: 7 metres (23 ft)

Administration
- Province: Province of Canterbury
- Diocese: Diocese of Birmingham

Clergy
- Vicar: Revd. Dr. John White

Baxterley Church is situated at the western side of the parish of Baxterley, Warwickshire, towards Wood End, and dates from the 12th century.

== History ==
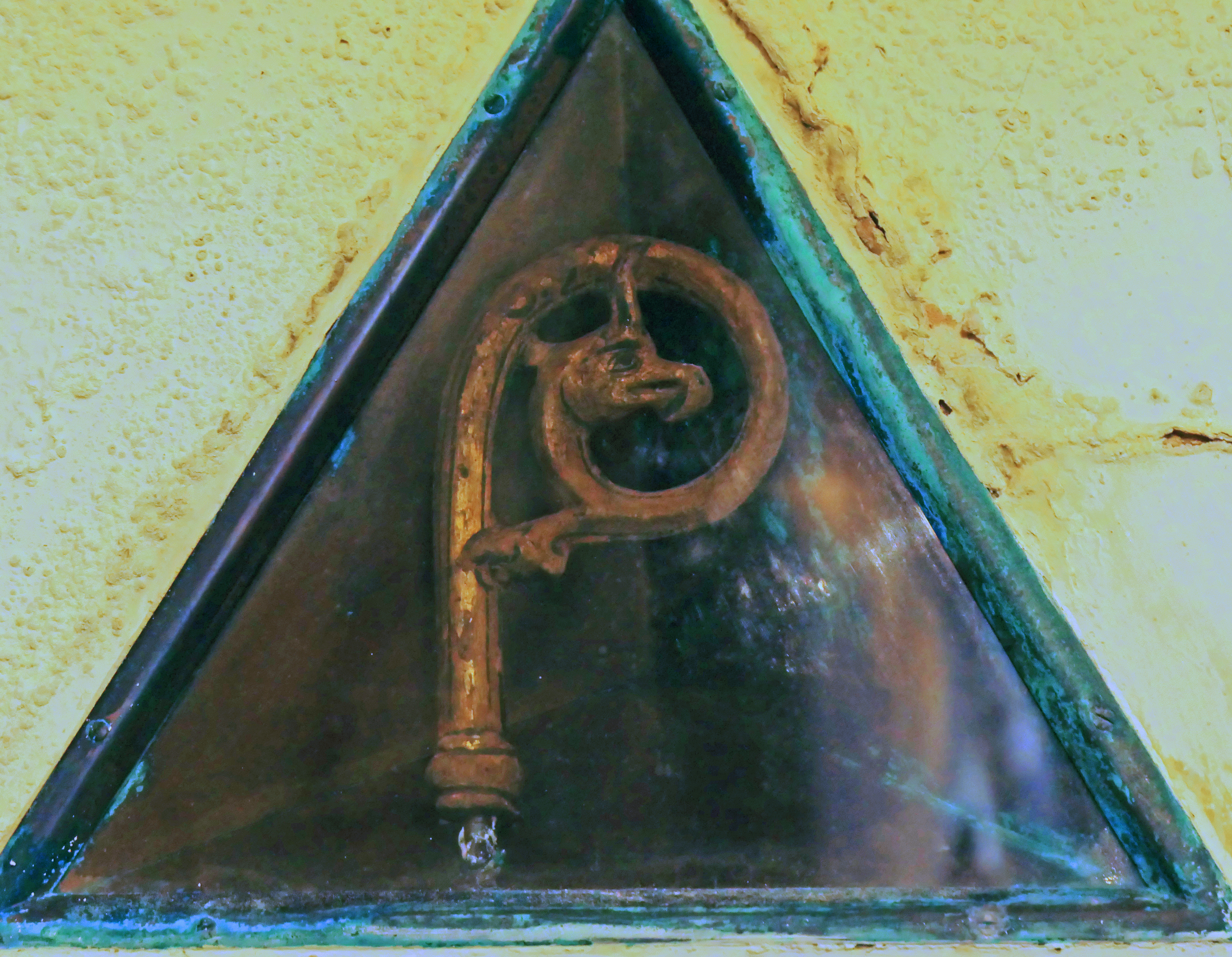
13th century crozier found during renovations

This small grade II listed parish church is of square plan. The windows in the c. 12th–century chancel are small. The church has been extended in the 13th, 14th and 19th–centuries. The font is 15th–century.

The church dates from Norman times and was built around 1200 AD with additions built throughout its life. The foundations of the nave date from the 14th century. The base of the small tower was built around 1540 but the top section is early 17th century. The church was extensively rebuilt c. 1875 by Paull and Bickerdike.

Hugh Latimer, Bishop of Oxford, preached a sermon at Baxterley Church on Christmas Day 1552. His niece, Mary Glover, lived nearby in Mancetter.

A 13th century wooden crozier head was found embedded in the wall in 1958; it is the oldest piece of church equipment in Warwickshire. (Note: VisitorUK.com)

== Profile ==
It is a small stone-built country church with a nave chancel and small tower. It is surrounded by a graveyard which contains a war grave of an airman of World War II.

The Church, surrounded by small farms, is situated around 1.7 miles (2.7 km) from the village; when the church was built Baxterley was the nearest settlement but since the construction of Wood End in 1890, which is 1.2 miles (2 km) away, this has become the nearest settlement.

It is part of the Kingsbury and Baxterley group of churches along with Kingsbury, Merevale, Hurley and Wood End. All five share the same Priest In Charge, who is currently Revd. Dr John White.

It is part of the Deanery of Polesworth, which is part of the Archdeaconry of Aston.

== Gallery ==
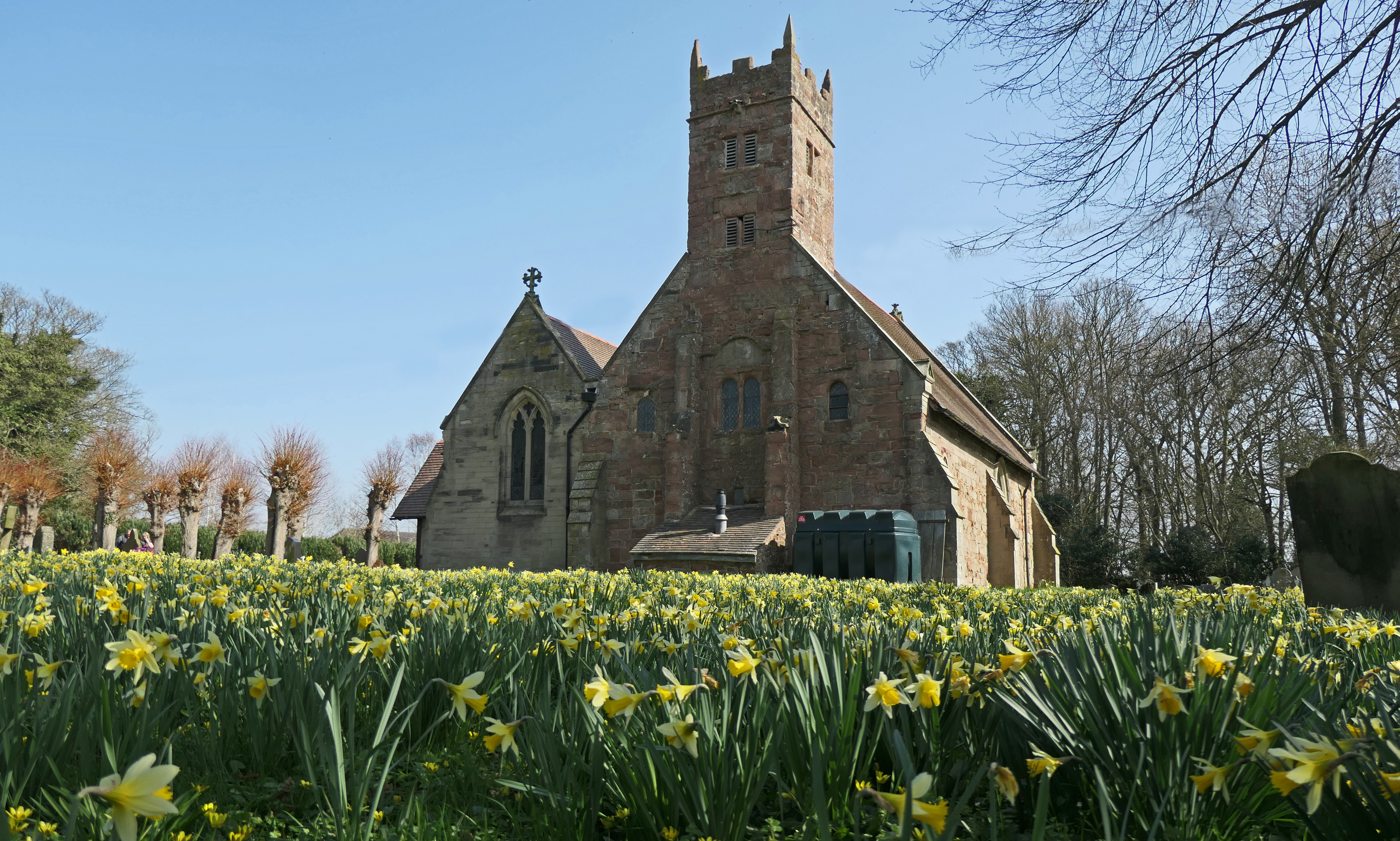
West end of the church

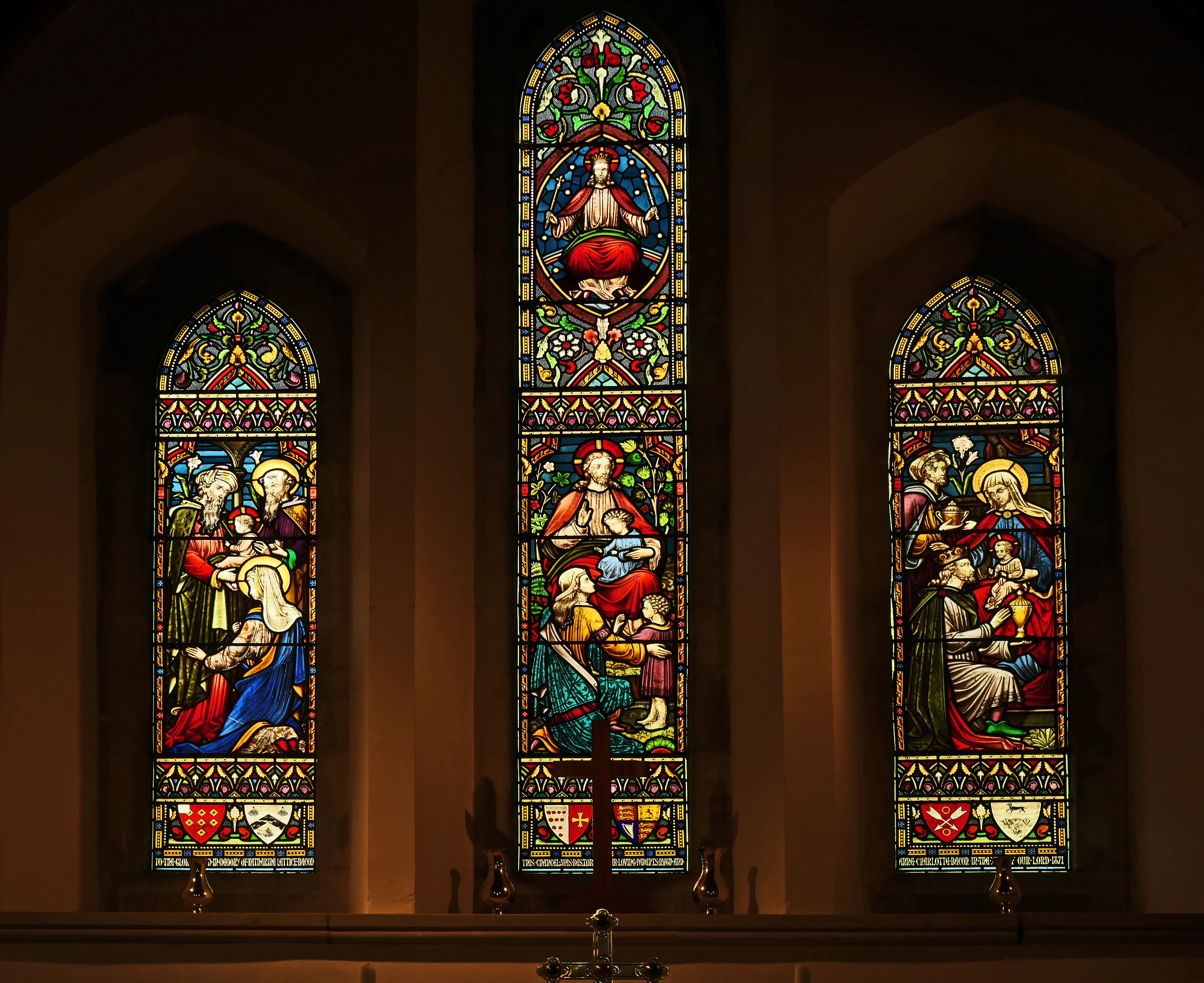
East window

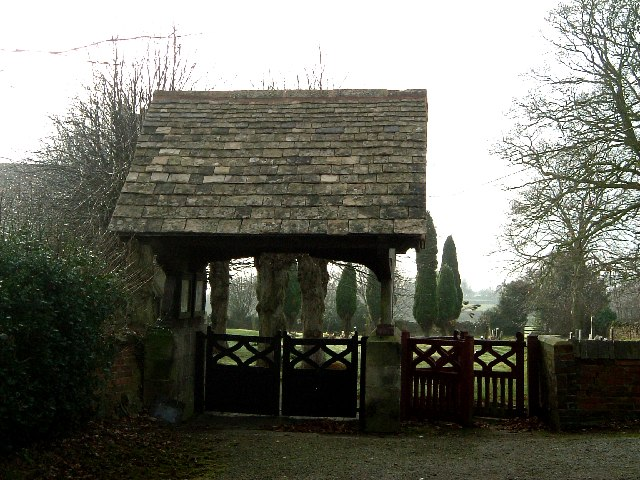
Lych gate
