= St Michael & All Angels Church, Wood End =

Coordinates: 52.581082°N 1.645765°W

St Michael & All Angels Church
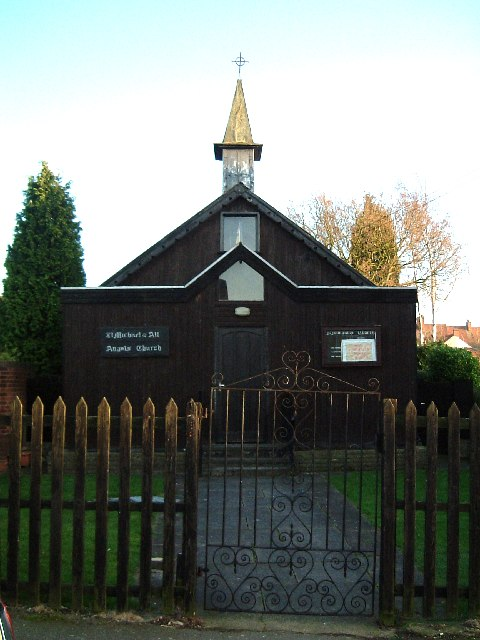
- Exterior of the church
- St Michael & All Angels Church
- Denomination: Church of England
- Churchmanship: Anglican
- Website: Kingsbury And Baxterley Churches

Administration
- Diocese: Diocese of Birmingham

Clergy
- Vicar: Revd.Carole Young

St Michael & All Angels Church is a Church of England church in the village of Wood End, Warwickshire, England. Built in 1906, this small wooden church is part of the parish of Baxterley with Hurley and Wood End

== History ==
The Church was built in 1906 for the village of Wood End which had been built in 1890. When the church was built it was on its own until it was surrounded by prefabricated housing which was re built during the 1980s.

The church has no distinctive features and has just a small hall.

== Today ==
The church is part of the Diocese of Birmingham, the archdeaconry of Aston, The Deanery of Polesworth and is in the parish of Baxterley with Hurley and Wood End.

It is part of the Kingsbury and Baxterley group of churches along with Baxterley, Kingsbury, Merevale and Hurley, All five share the same vicar who is currently Revd. Dr. John White.

Today it is the only place of worship in the village although Wood End is the nearest settlement to Baxterley Church.
