= The Polesworth School =

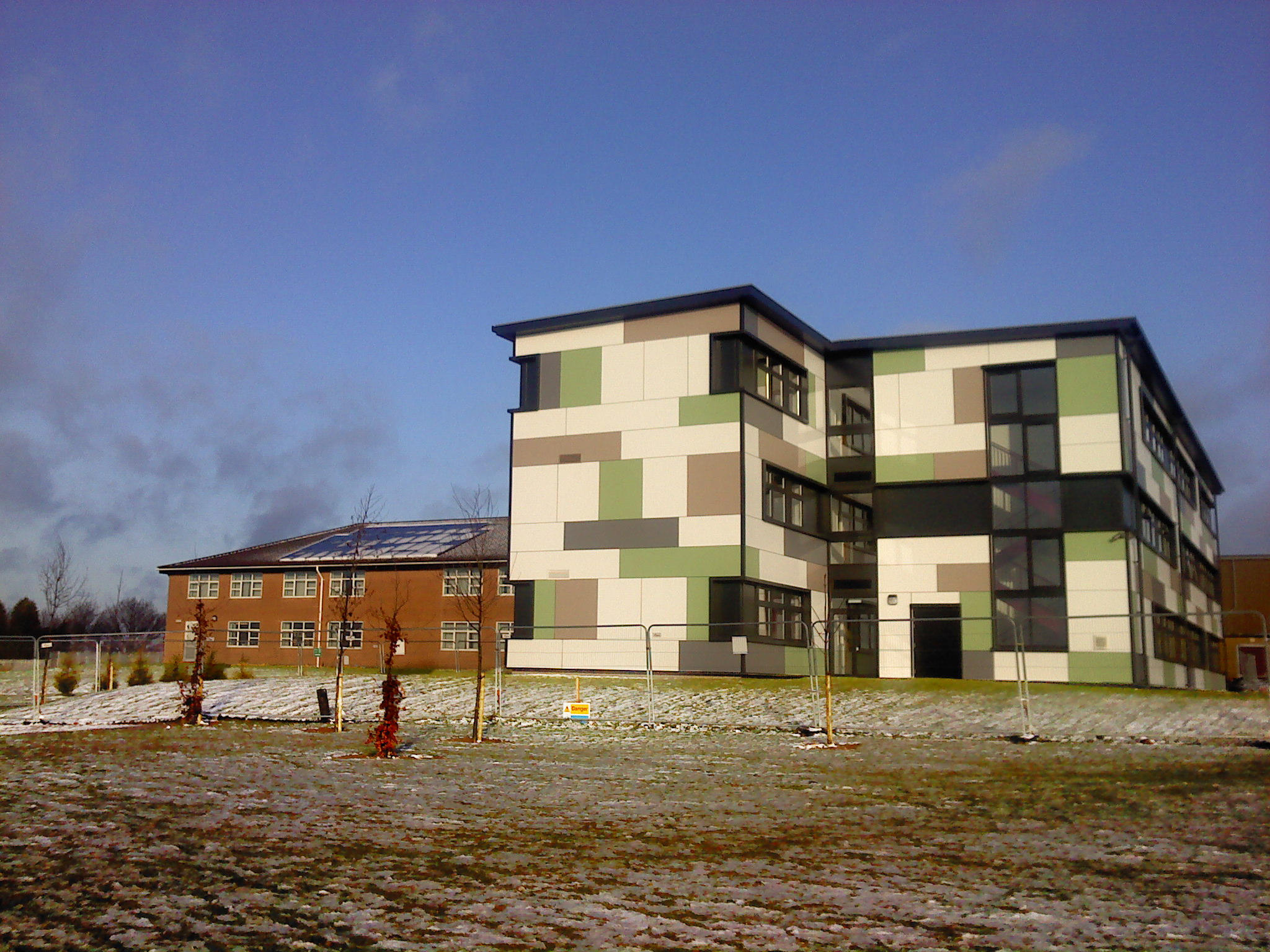
- Drayton Building - The Polesworth School

Location
- Dordon Road; Tamworth, Warwickshire, B78 1QT; England; 52°36′38″N 1°37′14″W

Information
- Type: Academy
- Established: 1881
- Local authority: Warwickshire County Council
- Department for Education URN: 136459 Tables
- Ofsted: Reports
- Headteacher: Maura Favell
- Staff: +160
- Gender: Coeducational
- Age: 11 to 18
- Enrolment: 1548
- Houses: Arden, Kenilworth, Stratford, Warwick
- Colour: Burgundy
- Website: http://www.thepolesworthschool.com

The Polesworth School is a coeducational secondary school located in Dordon, near Polesworth, Warwickshire, England. The Headteacher is Maura Favell.

== History ==
The Polesworth School was founded in 1881 as an elementary school taking students between the ages of three and fourteen. It became a Secondary Modern in 1944, a Warwickshire High School in 1957, a 12 – 18 Comprehensive in 1976 and an 11 – 18 school in 1994.

In February 2011, in line with the privileges afforded by an OFSTED outstanding rating, the School was given Academy status and is simply called The Polesworth School.

It is part of the Community Academies Trust.

== Facilities ==
The school occupies a 10-acre (40,000 m^{2}) site in the Polesworth area. Its facilities include a Sports Centre whose use was previously shared with the community, a Drama Studio and a separate sixth form block with its own teaching, study and social areas, a historically significant grade 2 listed building.

An aerial view of the School can be seen here.

== Houses and Year Group-Based Tutorial System ==
All students are in one of the following Houses: Arden, Kenilworth, Stratford or Warwick.

In September 2021, the mixed age tutorial system was taken out for a year group-based tutorial system due to COVID-19 restrictions. Each House has eight tutor groups per year. Each tutor group has a tutor and a co-tutor. The tutor groups include students from separate year groups (Years 7 – 13). In line with the nationallty prevailing cyclical nature of education policy, the horizontal tutor system was subsequently replaced with the previously established vertical system. As such, the current tutorial groups contain students from singular years.

== The Polesworth School 6th Form (@ Tomlinson Hall) ==
The Polesworth School Sixth Form at Tomlinson Hall is the Sixth Form Centre. It houses around 200 students in year 12 and 13. 6th formers have their own study area complete with a suite of computers and laptops for use during private study. Tomlinson Hall has consistently achieved outcomes beyond expected values, as demonstrasted by positive value added scores on recent DfE measures.

According to 2015 measures, compiled by ALIS, the Social Science department ranked within the top 10 nationally for value added to post-16 students.
