= St Peter's Church, Hall Green =

St Peter's Church
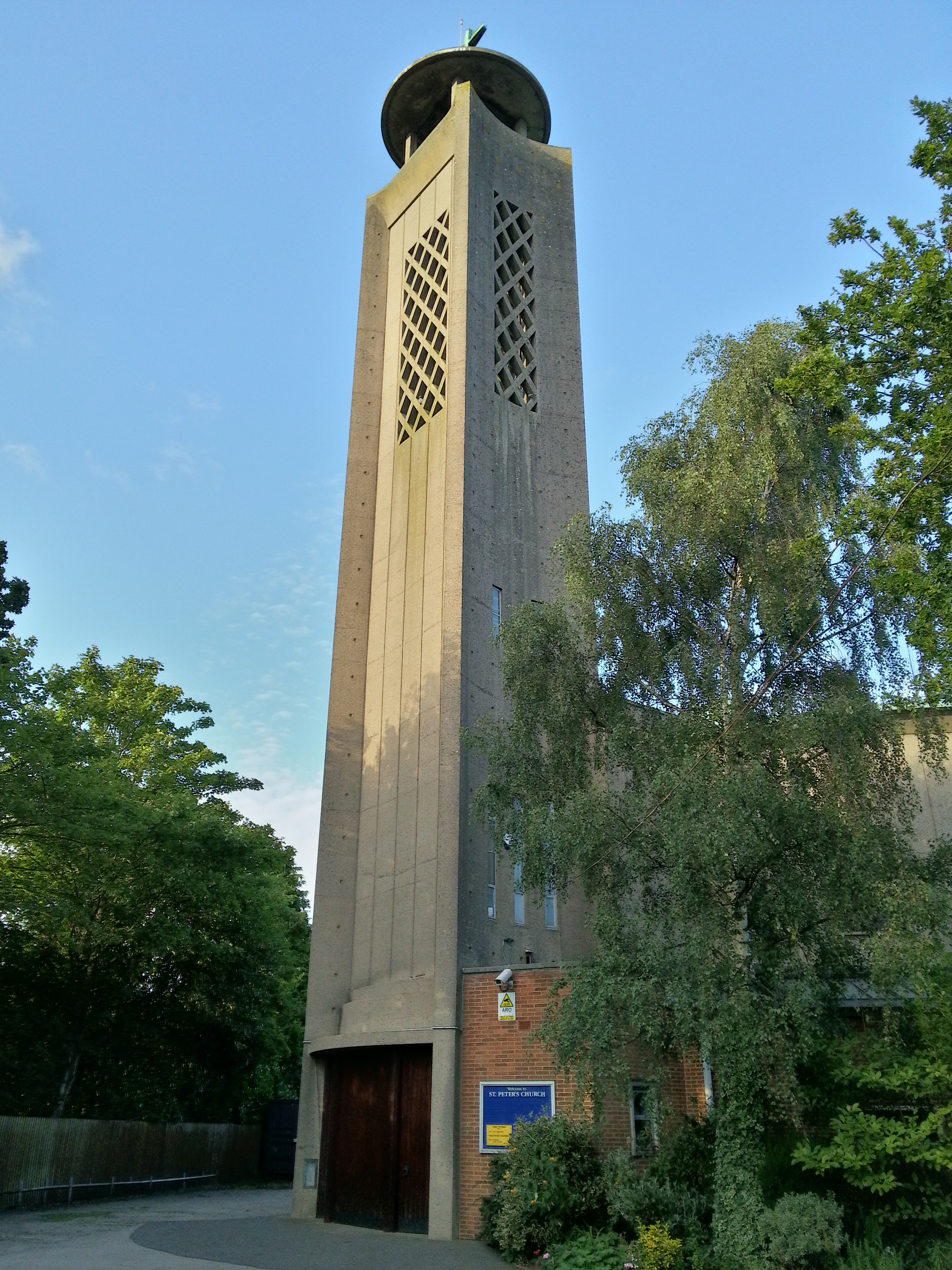
- 52.424198°N 1.852237°W
- Location: Highfield Road, Hall Green, Birmingham, England
- Denomination: Church of England
- Website: www.stpetershallgreen.org.uk

Administration
- Province: Canterbury
- Diocese: Birmingham
- Parish: Hall Green

St Peter's Church is a Church of England parish church in the Hall Green area of Birmingham, England.

== History ==
Following growth in the Hall Green area, Colonel Jervaise provided a generous gift of land and a small wooden building was erected and opened as a chapel in September 1923 dedicated to St Cadoc.

Growth continued and in 1954, the building was re-dedicated to St Peter.

On 18 April 1959 a fire engulfed the church and with it, plans for expansion. Services continued for four years in a wooden hut, then a new parish hall.

On 14 July 1962, the foundation stone for the new building was laid and the new building opened officially in 1964.

== Architecture ==
The church is locally listed with Birmingham City Council as Grade A which means it is of statutory list quality. The building is notable in that it is octagonal in shape and covered by a single span of concrete forming a dome. The height at the centre of the nave is 35 feet. The span between East and West is 93 feet, while the North to South span covers 75 feet. The tower is 102 feet high to the top of the cross.

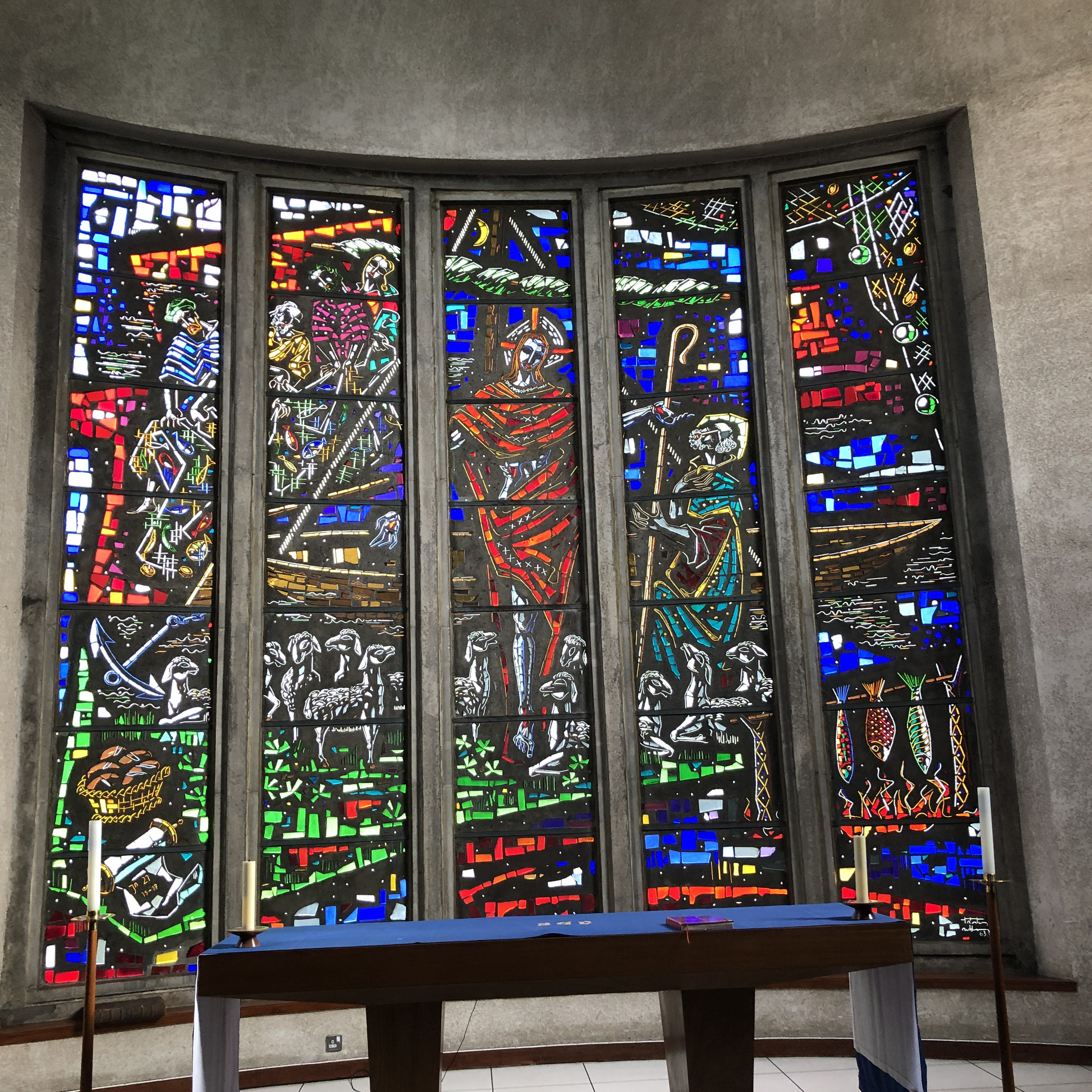
Tristan Ruhlman east window

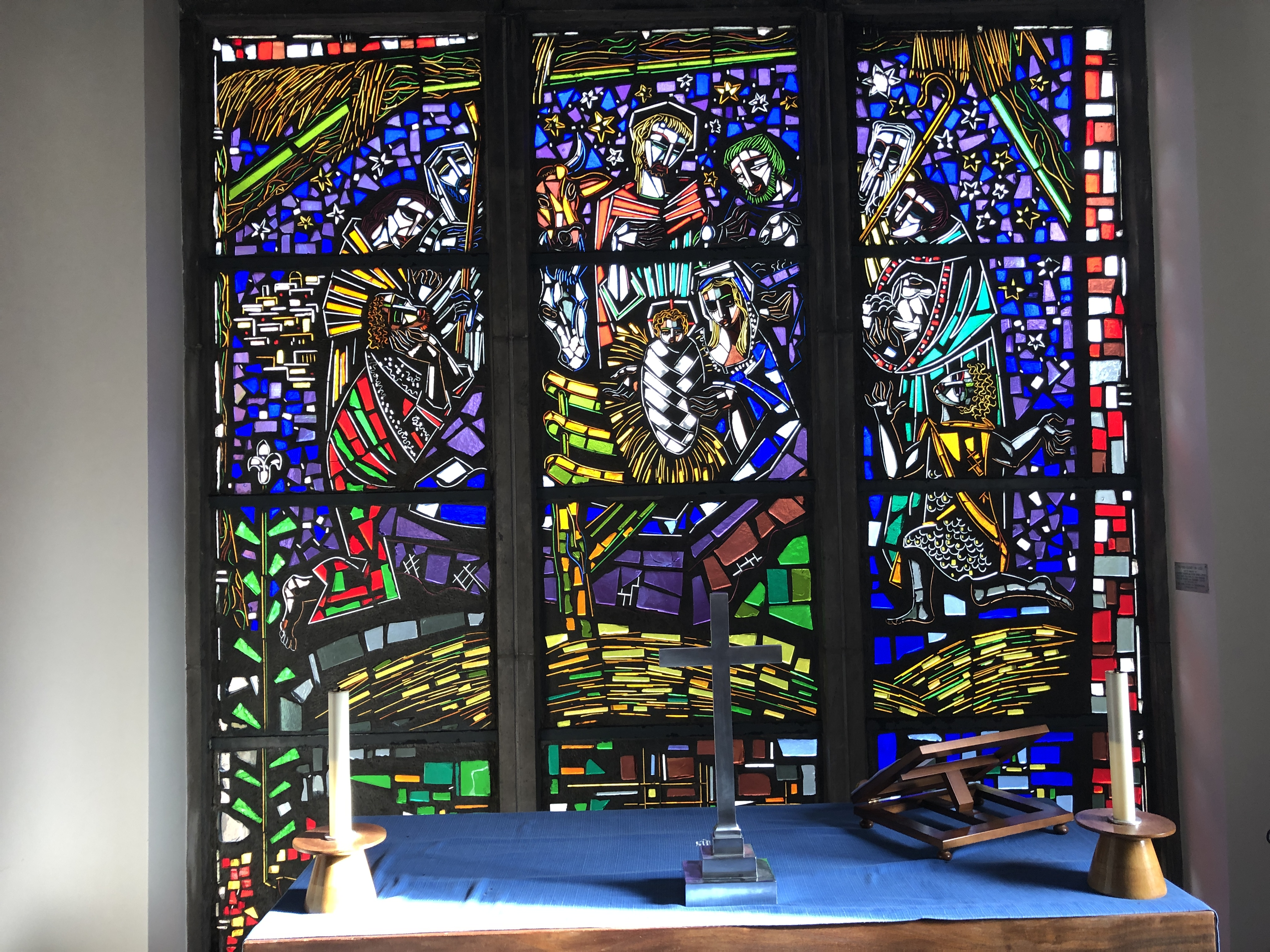
The Lady Chapel window

The stained glass windows include twelve carpet windows inspired by prayer mats, a lady chapel window depicting the scene of the nativity, and an East window which is one of the largest in Birmingham measuring 18 feet by 16 feet with a design based on the text from St John's Gospel telling St Peter "Feed my Sheep". All windows were designed by Tristan Ruhlmann from Alsace, France, and made of thick glass set in concrete.
