= Church of the Resurrection, Hurley =

Coordinates: 52.559797°N 1.637053°W

Church of the Resurrection
- Church of the Resurrection, Hurley
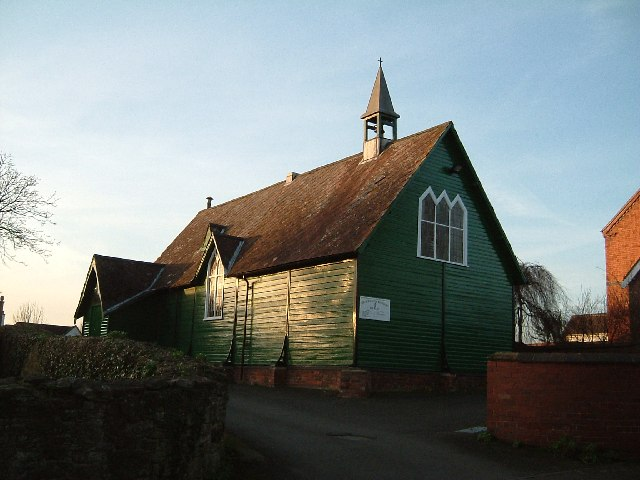

- Hurley shown within Warwickshire
- OS grid reference: SP 247 958
- Location: Hurley, Warwickshire
- Country: England
- Denomination: Church of England
- Churchmanship: Anglican
- Website: Kingsbury And Baxterley Churches

Administration
- Diocese: Diocese of Birmingham

Clergy
- Vicar: John White

Church of the Resurrection is a small wooden Church of England church in Hurley, Warwickshire, England, dating from 1861 It is part of the parish of Baxterley with Hurley and Wood End.

== History ==
The church was built in 1861 as a school. It was also used for Sunday services. the school later moved to a brick building behind the original wooden building. the later building was knocked down in 1998, when it was replaced by the current school building a short distance away. The foundations of the second building are still visible on the car park.

== Profile ==
The Church is made of wood and cast iron and is a green colour, it sits on the edge of Hurley. There is a graveyard to the church a short distance away, containing two war graves of First World War soldiers.

It is part of the Kingsbury and Baxterley group of churches along with Baxterley, Kingsbury, Merevale and Wood End. All five share the same Priest-in-Charge, John White. It is part of the Deanery of Polesworth, which is part of the Archdeanery of Aston.
