= Smethwick Old Church =

Old Church, Smethwick
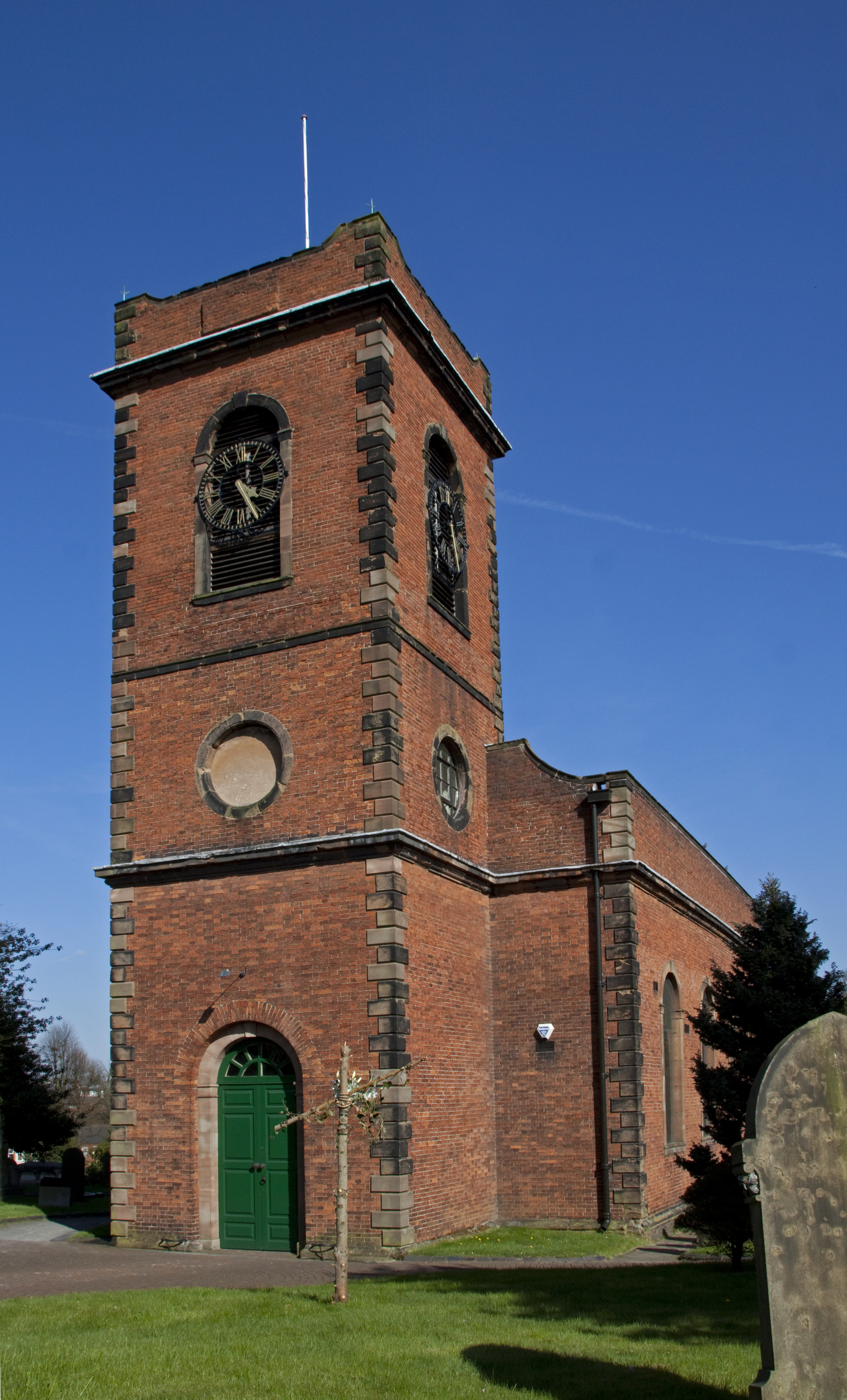
- Old Church, Smethwick
- 52°29′12″N 1°58′19″W
- Denomination: Church of England
- Website: smethwickoldchurch.org.uk

Administration
- Province: Canterbury
- Diocese: Birmingham
- Archdeaconry: Birmingham
- Deanery: Warley and Edgbaston
- Parish: Old Church, Smethwick

Clergy
- Vicar: Sara Moore

Smethwick Old Church is an Anglican parish church, located in the town of Smethwick, West Midlands, England. It is located on the junction of The Uplands and Church Road, adjacent to the Dorothy Parkes Community Centre and the 18th-century Old Chapel Public House. The church is a Grade II* listed building.

== History ==
The Old Church is the oldest surviving building in Smethwick, consecrated in 1732 as a chapel of ease to St Peter's in Harborne. It was originally known as 'Parkes' or 'Smethwick' Chapel, the name Parkes came from the wealthy local woman Dorothy Parkes who bequeathed the money to build the church. It became known as the Old Church in 1837, when the Holy Trinity Church was built on Smethwick High Street.

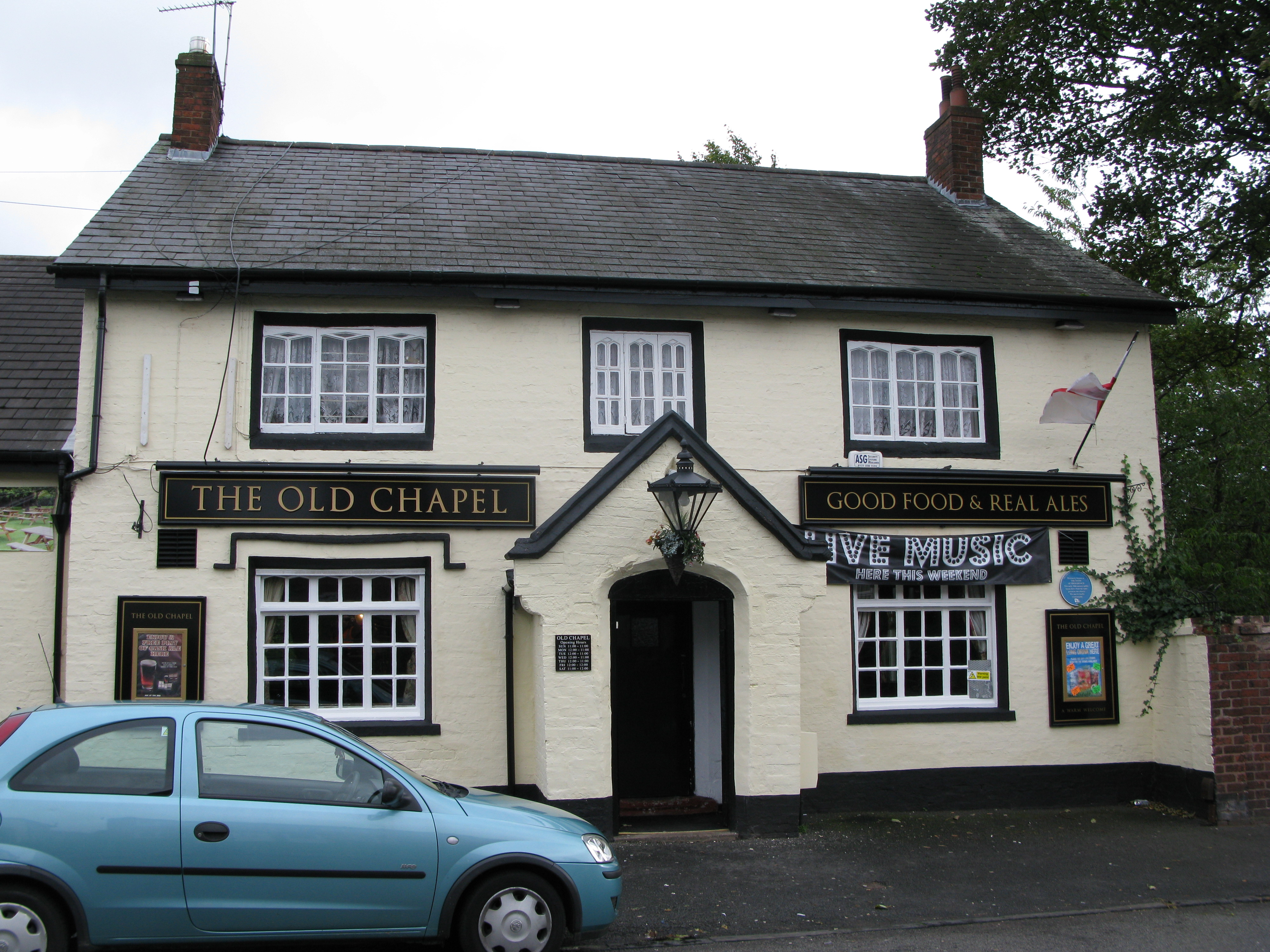
Public House next to the church

The public house next to the church gains its name from the church, and is the second oldest building still standing in Smethwick. The archives of Smethwick Old Church are held at Sandwell Community History and Archives Service.
