= Grendon, Warwickshire =

Civil parish in Warwickshire, England

Coordinates: 52.5930°N 1.5915°W

Grendon: Old Grendon
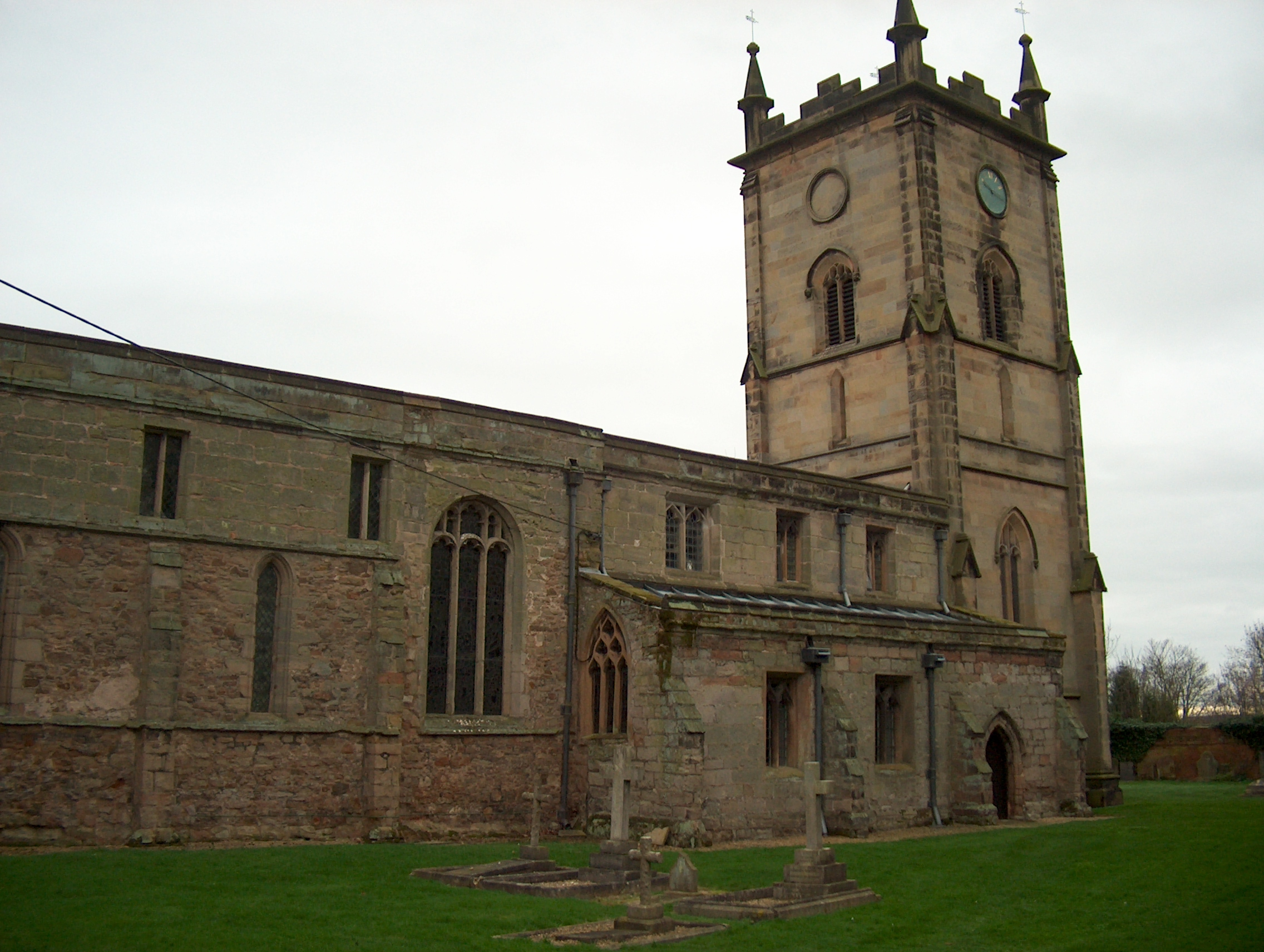
- All Saints Church in Grendon

- Location within Warwickshire
- Population: 1,943 (2021)
- OS grid reference: SP2799
  - London: 99 mi (159 km) SE
- Civil parish: Grendon
- District: North Warwickshire
- Shire county: Warwickshire
- Region: West Midlands
- Country: England
- Sovereign state: United Kingdom
- Post town: Atherstone
- Postcode district: CV9
- Dialling code: 01827
- Police: Warwickshire
- Fire: Warwickshire
- Ambulance: West Midlands
- UK Parliament: North Warwickshire

Grendon is a civil parish which includes both Old Grendon and New Grendon in North Warwickshire, England. Old Grendon is a village situated three miles (5 km) west of Atherstone and five miles (8 km) east of Tamworth centred on the A5 (Watling Street). It lies on the north-western tip of Warwickshire, divided from Leicestershire by a small stream and by the River Anker. Also, Grendon has since enlarged and has a population of 1,943 in the 2021 census.

== History ==
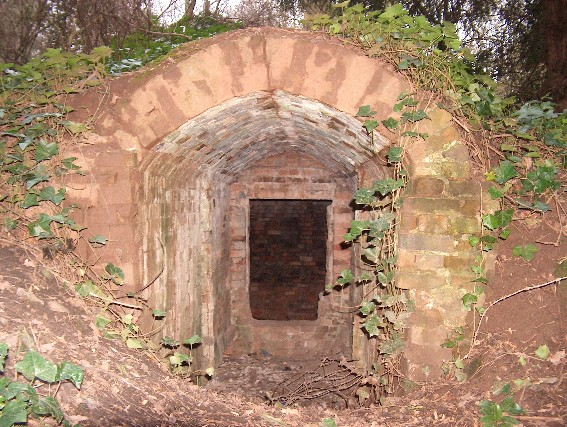
Entrance to Ice House

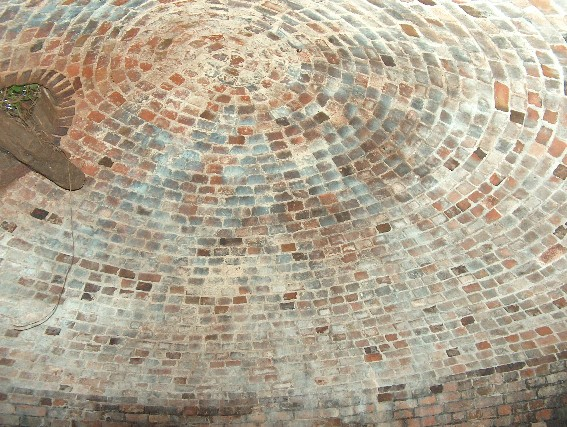
Domed ceiling of Ice House

Grendon is mentioned in the Domesday Book:

"Henry de Ferrers holds Catmore and five and a half hides in Grendon and Turstin holds on him. There is land for 16 ploughs. There are 24 villans and sixteen bordars with eight ploughs. There is a watermill rendering 5 shillings and 36 acres (150,000 m^{2}) of meadow, woodland – one and a half leagues long and one league broad. It was worth 40 shillings. Siward Barn held it."

Parts of All Saints Church date back to the 12th century, but the tower is a much later addition from 1845. The churchyard has several graves dating back to the 17th century and possibly older, but due to corrosion on some of the graves, this is difficult to verify. Seven men from Grendon were among the 32 killed in the 1882 explosion at Baddesley Pit. Some of these men are buried in the graveyard of All Saints Church in Old Grendon. Grendon Hall was demolished in 1933. However, there are several structures of age which remain, most notably the bridge over the River Anker, which in its current form dates back to 1633. The old servants' quarters are now a residential property and several old barns and stable buildings have also been converted into residential properties.

=== Farm lane ===
It is rumoured that the houses located on Farm Lane, originally to house farmworkers of Grendon Farm, were built on foundations created from the rubble produced in the demolition of Grendon Hall. In the woods off Farm Lane can be found a well-preserved underground ice house, which would have been used as a place to store ice (probably dragged from the nearby River Anker during the winter months) to serve the manor house's rudimentary refrigeration needs. This structure is of red brick, with a domed ceiling and is covered by a thin layer of earth. Ice would have been insulated with straw and if the ice was in large enough quantity it would have kept until the following winter. There are several other mounds of brick and earth in these woods suggesting other structures once existed as well.

== Governance ==
When New Grendon was built in the 1950s it was part of the Atherstone Rural District. In 1974 under the Local Government Act 1972 the Atherstone Rural District became part of the newly formed district of North Warwickshire. Inside North Warwickshire, Grendon is part of the Baddesley Ensor and Grendon Wards. As the ward is an old mining community it was considered a Labour safe seat until 2012, when the Conservatives gained power throughout North Warwickshire. It is part of the North Warwickshire parliamentary constituency and was part of the West Midlands European Parliament constituency which was represented by 6 MEPs.

== Media ==
The local newspapers covering the area are the Tamworth Herald, which has a separate edition for North Warwickshire and the Atherstone Recorder. The local BBC radio station covering the area is BBC CWR. Local commercial stations in the area include Hits Radio Coventry & Warwickshire and Capital Mid-Counties. The village is covered by the Central ITV and BBC West Midlands TV regions.

== New Grendon ==
The village has a post office, a Working Man Club and a newsagents. Grendon was spawned from the mine that once existed in Baxterley. Grendon was originally a small hamlet called Suckle green and the construction of Grendon didn't start fully until the 1950s. Grendon was named after the older village of Grendon about a mile away. The mine at Baxterley that Grendon was built to serve closed in 1989.

== Bibliography ==
- Grendon, from British History Online, accessed 29 January 2007
