= Bentley, Warwickshire =

Village and civil parish in Warwickshire, England

Coordinates: 52.560°N 1.583°W

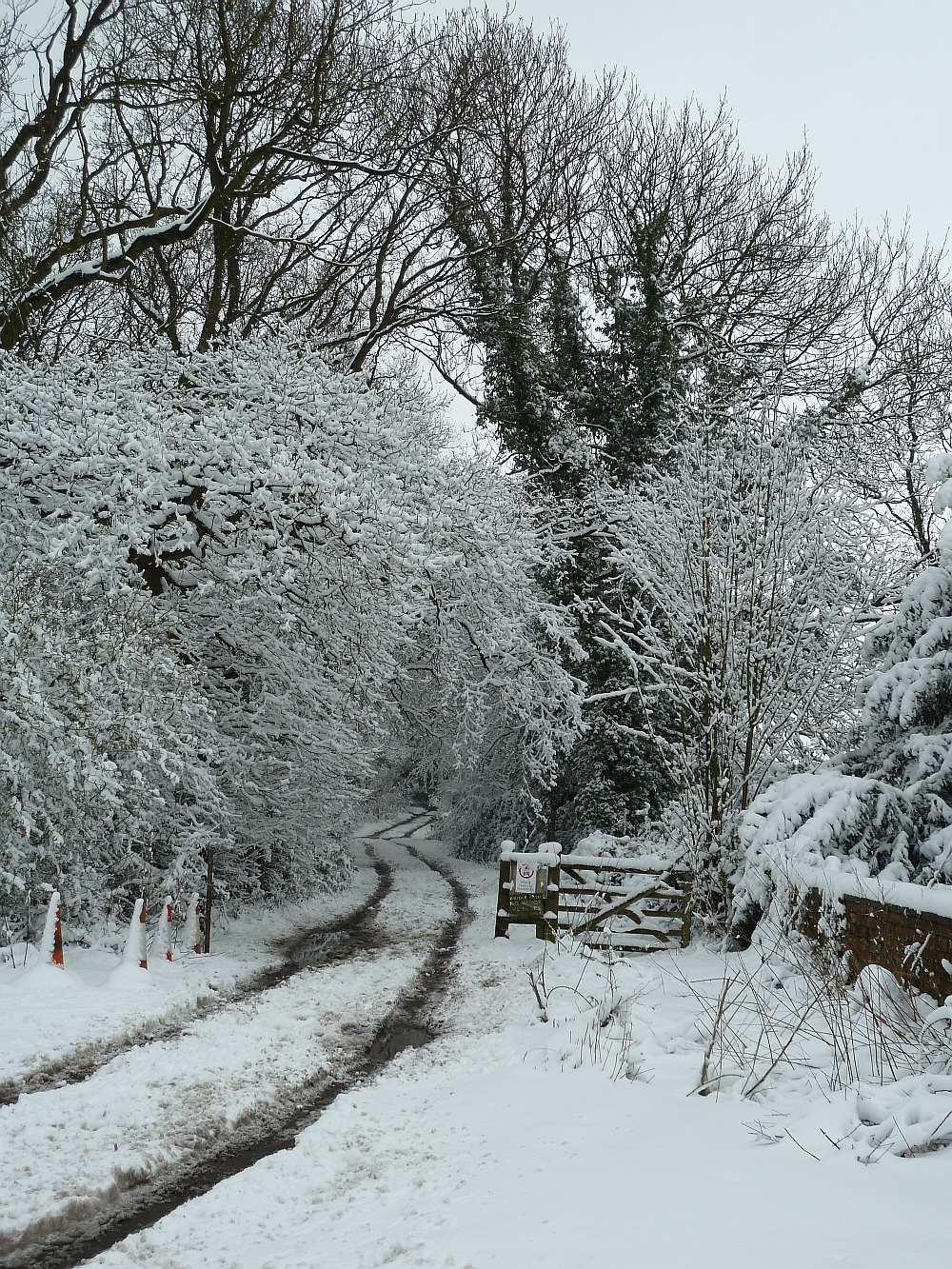
Snowy track into Bentley Park Wood

Bentley is a village and civil parish in the North Warwickshire district of Warwickshire, England, about two miles south-west of Atherstone. According to the 2021 census it had a population of 150.
