= Baddesley Ensor =

Village and civil parish in Warwickshire, England

Coordinates: 52.57°N 01.60°W

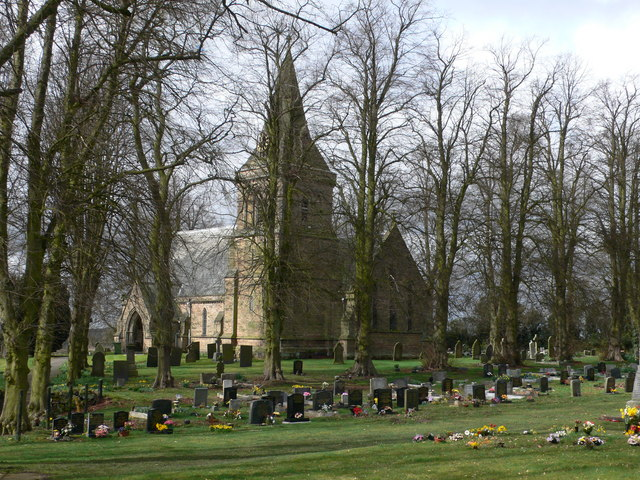
- St Nicholas's Church, Baddesley Ensor

- Location within Warwickshire
- Population: 1,950 (Census 2021)
- OS grid reference: SP2798
- District: North Warwickshire
- Shire county: Warwickshire
- Region: West Midlands
- Country: England
- Sovereign state: United Kingdom
- Post town: Atherstone
- Postcode district: CV9
- Police: Warwickshire
- Fire: Warwickshire
- Ambulance: West Midlands

Baddesley Ensor is a village and civil parish in the district of North Warwickshire in Warwickshire, England, about three miles west of Atherstone. At the 2021 census, the parish had a population of 1,950. It runs into the village of Grendon, which forms a parish itself.

== History ==
There were mining activities in the area for centuries before the two main shafts, which formed Baddesley Colliery, were sunk in 1850. Although called Baddesley Colliery it was actually just over the border in Baxterley. From then on until 1989 when the pit closed most Baddesley men worked in some capacity at the mine. The worst disaster at the mine occurred on 2 May 1882. There was a fire followed by an explosion and 23 men lost their lives in attempting to rescue nine night shift workers trapped by the fire. A memorial to all the men who worked in the mines, in the form of a pit head winding wheel was erected on the common on the site of the old Maypole pit. Since the closure of the mine the village is now mainly residential.

== Landmarks ==
Baddesley Ensor is known for its common. There are beautiful views to be seen looking over towards Birmingham, and also Leicestershire, Derbyshire and Staffordshire. Other landmarks are the old wheel used for mining, the old pit, and a bomb hole. The pit has since been developed into a distribution centre for Jaguar Land-Rover, with a capacity to contain up to 9,500 cars for distribution to dealers. There is a fish bar and a barbers located at the top of keys hill. There is also a library used for borrowing books and also allows the use of computers if requested.

== Transport ==
The A5 (Watling Street) runs near to the village and the M42 is nearby. The village is served by bus routes 748, 761, 766, 767, and the nearest railway station is Atherstone. The nearest airports are Birmingham (10 miles) and East Midlands (20 miles).

== Media ==
Local newspapers are the Tamworth Herald, which has a separate edition for North Warwickshire, and the Atherstone & Coleshill Herald. The BBC radio station covering the area is BBC CWR. Local commercial stations in the area include Hits Radio Coventry & Warwickshire and Capital Mid-Counties. The village is covered by the Central ITV and BBC West Midlands TV regions broadcast from the nearby Sutton Coldfield transmitting station.
