= Church of SS Mary and Ambrose, Edgbaston =

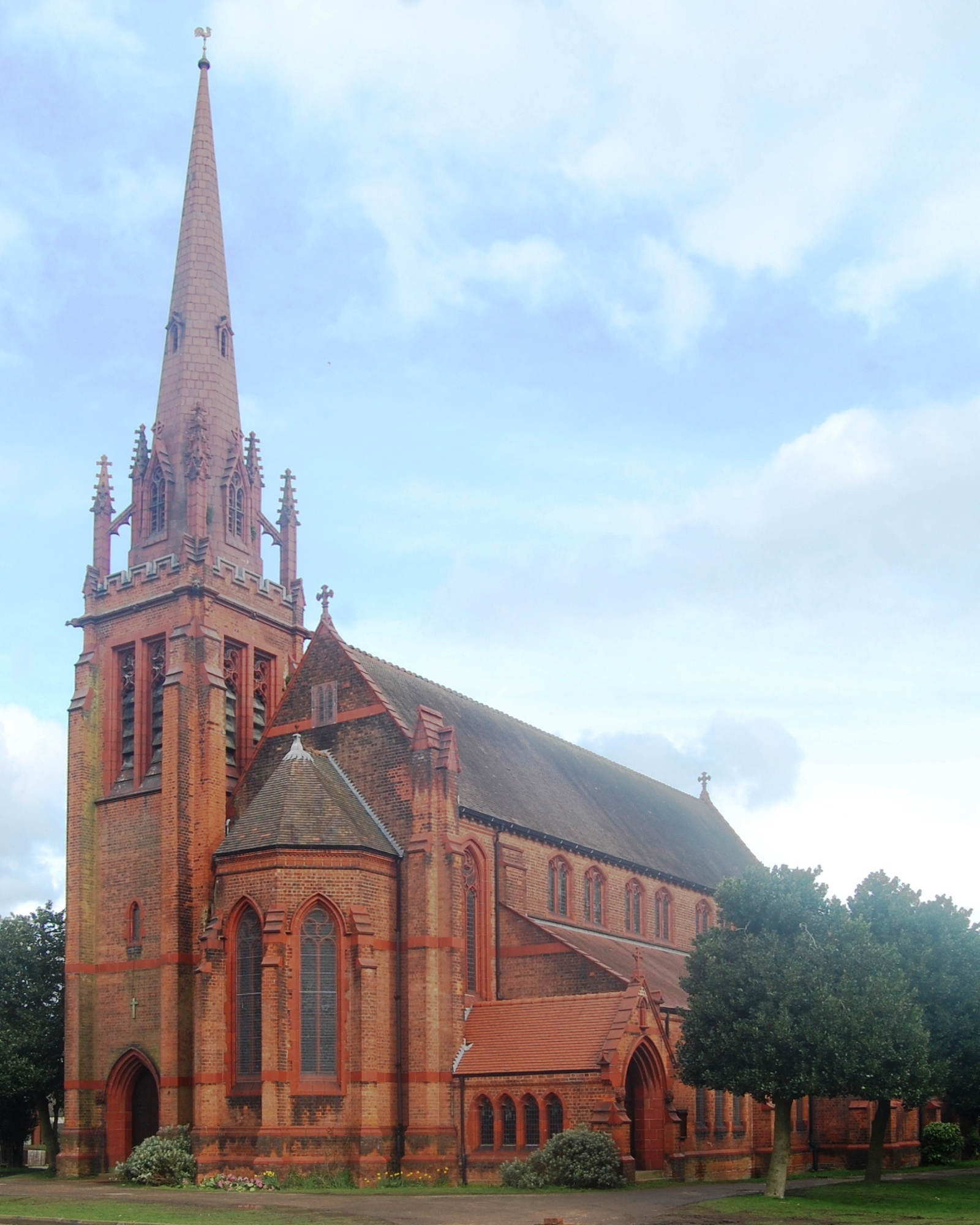
- Church of SS Mary and Ambrose, Edgbaston, in March 2022
- Church of SS Mary and Ambrose, Edgbaston
- 52.4585°N 1.9038°W
- OS grid reference: SP 06628 84502
- Location: Birmingham
- Country: England
- Denomination: Church of England
- Website: balsallheathandedgbaston.org.uk

History
- Consecrated: 28 September 1898

Architecture
- Architect: J. A. Chatwin
- Groundbreaking: 1897
- Completed: 1898
- Construction cost: £8,000 (equivalent to £899,000 in 2025)

Administration
- Diocese: Diocese of Birmingham
- Archdeaconry: Birmingham archdeaconry
- Deanery: Moseley deanery
- Parish: St Mary and St Ambrose, Edgbaston

Church of SS Mary and Ambrose, Edgbaston is a Grade II listed parish church in the Church of England in Birmingham.

== History ==
The site for the church was given by Augustus Gough-Calthorpe, 6th Baron Calthorpe. The church cost £8,000 with the parishioners contributing £2,000 and the Misses Stokes of the Hawthorns, Edgbaston, the balance. The church was consecrated by the Bishop of Worcester Rt. Revd. John Perone on 28 September 1898.

The church was built between 1897 and 1898 by J. A. Chatwin. It was a daughter parish to St Bartholomew's Church, Edgbaston.

== Clergy ==
- 1891–1915: Arthur G Lloyd
- 1915–1950: Martin Cope Heathcote Hughes
- 1950–1975: Alfred Doyle
- 1975–1983: Nigel Graham
- 1983–1988: Richard Wilcox
- 1990–1994: John Ward
- 1996–2002: Hilary Savage
- 2004–2016: Catherine Grylls
- 2025–present: Chris Mitton

== Organ ==
The first organ in the church was built by J. W. Walker & Sons Ltd in 1898. A specification of the organ can be found on the National Pipe Organ Register.

=== Organists ===
- W. Timperley ca. 1890
- H.S. Williams ca. 1907
- C.F. Mottram 1919 - ????
- Geoffrey Norman Gibbon 1946 - 1948
- Anthony John Cooke 1948 – 1949
- Harrison Oxley 1949 - 1950
- Geoffrey Norman Gibbons 1950 - 1961 (afterwards organist at Henley in Arden)
- Malcolm Jones 1968 - ???? (formerly organist of St Philip's Church, Dorridge)
- Anthony White 1983 - 1986
- David Dewar 1989 - 1991
