= All Saints' Church, Small Heath (II) =

All Saints’ Church, Small Heath
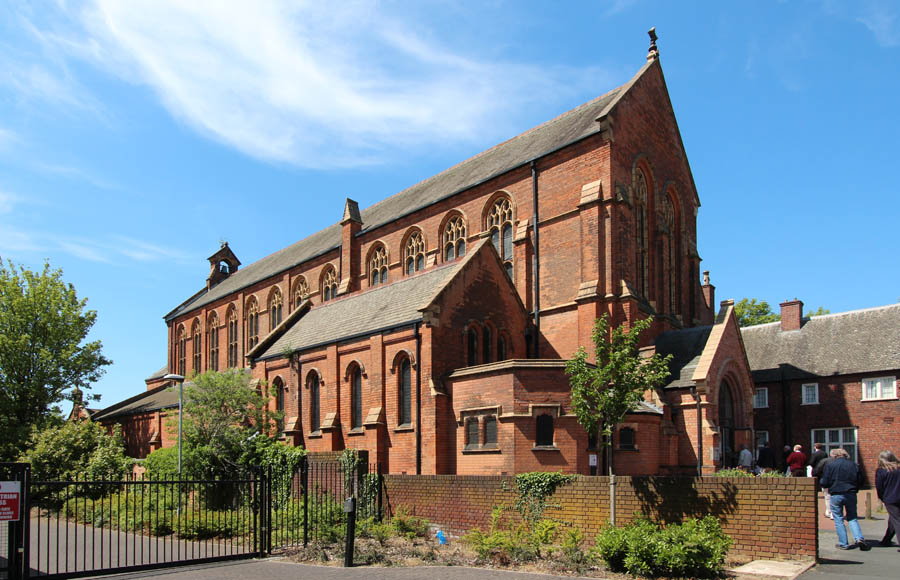
- All Saints’ Church, Small Heath (formerly St Aidan’s)

- 52°28′13.84″N 1°51′59.69″W
- Location: Small Heath, Birmingham
- Country: England
- Denomination: Church of England
- Churchmanship: Anglo-Catholicism
- Website: allsaintsonline.co.uk

History
- Former name(s): St Aidan’s Church, Small Heath
- Dedication: All Saints
- Consecrated: 14 October 1896

Architecture
- Heritage designation: Grade II* listed
- Architect: Thomas Frederick Proud
- Groundbreaking: 2 September 1893
- Completed: 1898

Administration
- Province: Province of Canterbury
- Diocese: Anglican Diocese of Birmingham
- Archdeaconry: Aston
- Deanery: Yardley and Bordesley
- Parish: All Saints Small Heath

Clergy
- Vicar: Father Julian Sampson

All Saints’ Church, Small Heath is a Grade II* listed parish church in the Church of England in Birmingham, which until 1998 was known as St Aidan's Church, Small Heath.

== History ==
The church was designed by the architect Thomas Frederick Proud.

The foundation stone was laid on 2 September 1893 by Lady Mary Wood. The first portion of the church opened on Sunday 2 September 1894.

It was consecrated as St Aidan's by the Bishop of Worcester on Wednesday 14 October 1896. The font came from St Stephen's Church, Bristol. A parish was assigned out of All Saints’ Church, Small Heath in 1897.

During the 1990s a protracted re-organisation was undertaken, and four churches in Small Heath (St Aidan's, St Gregory's, St Andrew's and St Oswald's) were amalgamated. The new parish decided to retain only St Aidan's Church building, and in 1998 this was renamed All Saints, taking the dedication from a previous church All Saints' Church, Small Heath (I).

== Organ ==
An organ dating from 1871 by Taylor of Leicester was installed in 1999. A specification of the organ can be found on the National Pipe Organ Register. The instrument was removed from the church in 2012 and moved to Holy Trinity, Sutton in Somerset. The blower was not moved with the organ, but was donated to the Leicester Museum service who wished to maintain what was an outstanding example of Taylor's work.
