= St Oswald's Church, Small Heath =

St Oswald’s Church, Small Heath
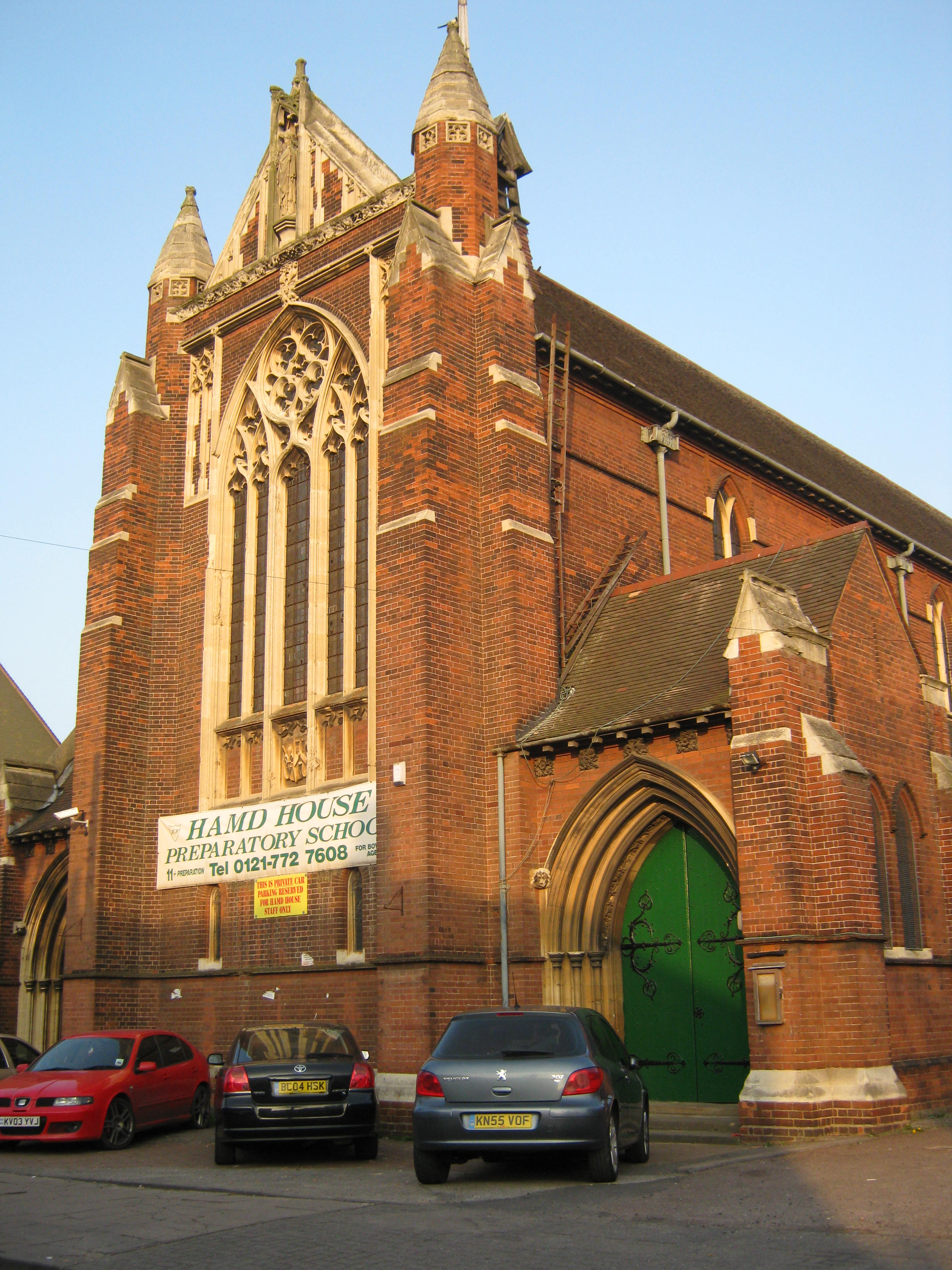
- St Oswald’s Church, Small Heath (2011)
- St Oswald’s Church, Small Heath
- 52°28′6.33″N 1°51′8.85″W
- OS grid reference: SP 10169 85610
- Location: Small Heath, Birmingham
- Country: England
- Denomination: Church of England

History
- Dedication: Oswald of Worcester
- Consecrated: 27 September 1893

Architecture
- Architect: William Bidlake
- Groundbreaking: 1892
- Completed: 1893

St Oswald's Church, Small Heath is a Grade II* listed former parish church in the Church of England in Birmingham.

== History ==
The church was designed by the architect William Bidlake and built between 1892 and 1893. It was consecrated on 27 September 1893.

It was a mission from St Andrew's Church, Bordesley. It was enlarged between 1899 and 1900. The altarpiece is by Sidney Meteyard dating from 1916 and the statue of St Oswald was carved by George Latham.

Bidlake also provided a vicarage in Dora Road in the Arts and Crafts style.

Part of the parish was taken in 1924 to form a new parish for St Gregory the Great's Church, Small Heath.

On closure the church was converted into a preparatory school. The parish merged into St. Aidan's Church, Small Heath and was renamed as All Saints

== Organ ==
The two manual pipe organ by William Hill of 1846 was moved here from St Peter's Church, Handsworth. A specification of the organ can be found on the National Pipe Organ Register.
