= Old Town Hall, Handsworth =

Municipal building in Handsworth, West Midlands, England

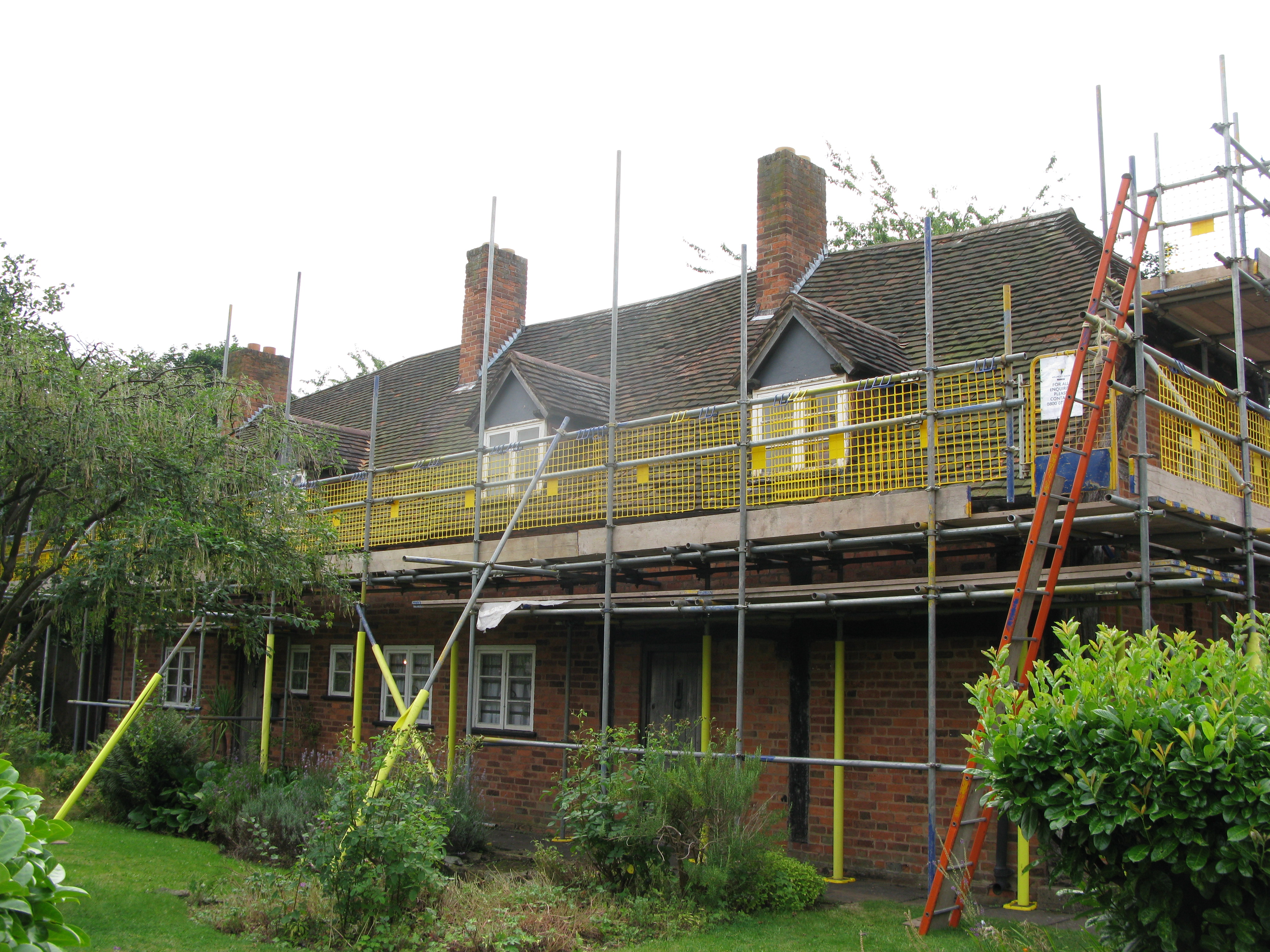
- The building in 2013, while under repair

- Shown in West Midlands
- 52.5145°N 1.9355°W
- Location: Slack Lane, Handsworth

History
- Built: 1460

Site notes
- Architectural style: Medieval style

Listed Building – Grade II
- Official name: 51, College Road B20, 20, Slack Lane B20
- Designated: 24 September 1972
- Reference no.: 1075634

The Old Town Hall is a historic building on the corner of College Road and Slack Lane in Handsworth, West Midlands, a suburb of Birmingham in England. The building, part of which is currently used as the headquarters of the Handsworth Historical Society, is a Grade II listed building.

== History ==
The building was commissioned as a private house in the mid-15th century. It was designed in the medieval style, built using cruck-framed construction techniques and was completed about 1460.

In 1625, it was divided into three cottages, with a floor inserted in the building's hall, and the walls infilled with brick. Part of the building accommodated the Overseer of the Parish, who was in charge of local administration and, being in an area known as "Town End", it became known as the Town Hall. During the early part of the 18th century the overseer was a James Underhill and he was succeeded by a Jeremiah Needham. By the 19th century, the overseer of the parish was, among other matters, responsible for the maintenance of the village green. The building was also used as a courthouse and was the local venue for hearings of the assizes.

Following significant population growth, largely associated with industrialisation including the Soho Manufactory, an urban sanitary authority was formed in Handsworth in 1874. The board commissioned the Council House on Soho Road and, after it was completed two years later, the old town hall had no further role in the administration of the area. In any case, the board's successor body, Handsworth Urban District Council, which was appointed in 1894, was wound up when the area was annexed by Birmingham City Council in 1911.

In the 1930s, other similar cottages and barns in the area were cleared but, following a campaign by the Lord Mayor of Birmingham, Sir Ernest Robert Canning, in 1933, the old town hall survived, and in 1947 it was acquired by the Birmingham Archaeological Society which restored it, redivided into two, larger, cottages, and donated it to Birmingham City Council.

In 1973, the Handsworth Historical Society began using one of the cottages as its headquarters and as a local history museum. The other cottage continued to be rented out to a council tenant.

== Architecture ==
The cruck-framed building has brick infill between the wood, and a tiled roof. It has a single main storey and an attic, and two entrance doors. There are five casement windows on the ground floor, three large and two small, and four gabled dormer windows in the attic. It has been grade II listed since 1972.
