= St James' Church, Handsworth =

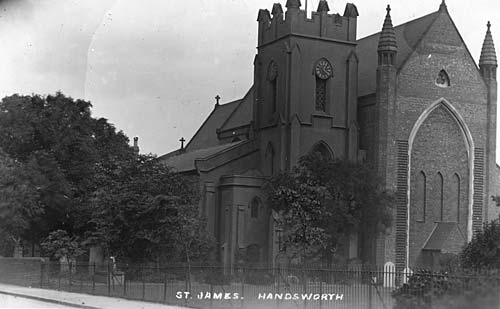
- Postcard of St James' Church, before the new chancel was built in 1878
- St James' Church, Handsworth
- 52.5052°N 1.9484°W
- OS grid reference: SP 03502 89742
- Denomination: Church of England
- Churchmanship: Liberal High Church

Administration
- Diocese: Birmingham
- Parish: St James

Clergy
- Vicar: Reverend Dr David Isiorho

St James' Church in Handsworth, Birmingham, England was erected as an Anglican church in 1838–1840 (Handsworth was at that time in the county of Staffordshire) on land given by John Crockett of the nearby New Inns Hotel. The architect was Robert Ebbles of Wolverhampton, who specialised in Gothic Revival churches. A new chancel was added in 1878 and the building was rebuilt in 1895, to designs by J. A. Chatwin. The original chancel thus became the north chapel, the original nave became the north aisle, and the original western tower was redesignated as the north-west tower. The additions were a new chancel, a nave, and a south aisle. Chatwin's Decorated style, red-brick features contrasted with the Early English style stonework of the original building.

The church's parish was created out of that of Saint Mary's in 1854. Portions were ceded to become parts of the parishes of St Peter in 1907, and St. Andrew in 1914.

From 1883, the vicar was the Rev. Thomas Smith Cave.

The noted composer Theodore Stephen Tearne Mus Bac, L. Mus, F.S.Sc. (born 1860) was an organist at the church from 1904 to 1908, immediately prior to his emigration to Australia.

The famous tenor Leslie Webster Booth (born 1902) was a chorister at the church from 1909 to 1911, before he was accepted as a chorister at Lincoln Cathedral.

The church's early baptism, marriage, and burial registers, and various parish meeting minutes, are in the archives of the Library of Birmingham.

As of May 2014, the vicar is the Reverend Dr David Isiorho, a former social worker and a member of the editorial board of the journal Black Theology. Worship is conducted in the Liberal High Church tradition. The church sits on the corner of Saint James Road, to which it gives its name, and Crocketts Road, just off the A41 Holyhead Road, and is in the Anglican Diocese of Birmingham.
