= St John Wall Catholic School =

Coordinates: 52.5161°N 1.9502°W

Location
- Oxhill Road; Handsworth; Birmingham, West Midlands, B21 8HH; England

Information
- Type: Voluntary aided school
- Motto: ‘A Catholic School for All’
- Religious affiliation: Roman Catholic
- Local authority: Birmingham City Council
- Department for Education URN: 103534 Tables
- Ofsted: Reports
- Headteacher: Katherine Marston
- Gender: Coeducational
- Age: 11 to 16
- Enrolment: 630 as of January 2023
- Website: http://www.sjw.bham.sch.uk/

St John Wall Catholic School is a coeducational secondary school located in the Handsworth area of Birmingham, in the West Midlands of England.

It is a voluntary aided school administered by Birmingham City Council and the Roman Catholic Archdiocese of Birmingham. The school is named after Saint John Wall, a 17th-century Franciscan friar who is honored as a martyr.

St John Wall Catholic School offers GCSEs and BTECs as programmes of study for pupils.

The school used to operate a sixth form offering students a range of A-levels and further BTECs. However the school closed its sixth form provision in 2016.
