= St James' Church, Aston =

- St James' Church, Aston
- 52°30′14.7″N 1°53′30.5″W
- OS grid reference: SP 07343 89622
- Location: Aston, Birmingham
- Country: England
- Denomination: Church of England
- Website: www.astonnechellscofe.org.uk

History
- Dedication: St James

Architecture
- Architect: G Winteringham
- Completed: 1981

Administration
- Diocese: Anglican Diocese of Birmingham

St James' Church is a parish church in the Church of England in Aston, Birmingham, England.

== History ==
The church formed as a mission church from Church of SS Peter & Paul, Aston in 1891 and a new building was erected in 1906 to the designs of the architect J.A. Chatwin.

It was consecrated by Charles Gore, Bishop of Birmingham, on Saturday 2 November 1906.

The Chatwin church was demolished and a new church built in 1981 to the designs of the architect G Winteringham. This building was damaged in a fire in 2001 but was restored and reopened.

== Organ ==
The Chatwin church of 1906 was equipped with a three manual pipe organ by Conacher of Sheffeld. A specification of the organ can be found on the National Pipe Organ Register. but is no longer present.
