= St Michael's Church, Handsworth =

St Michael's Church
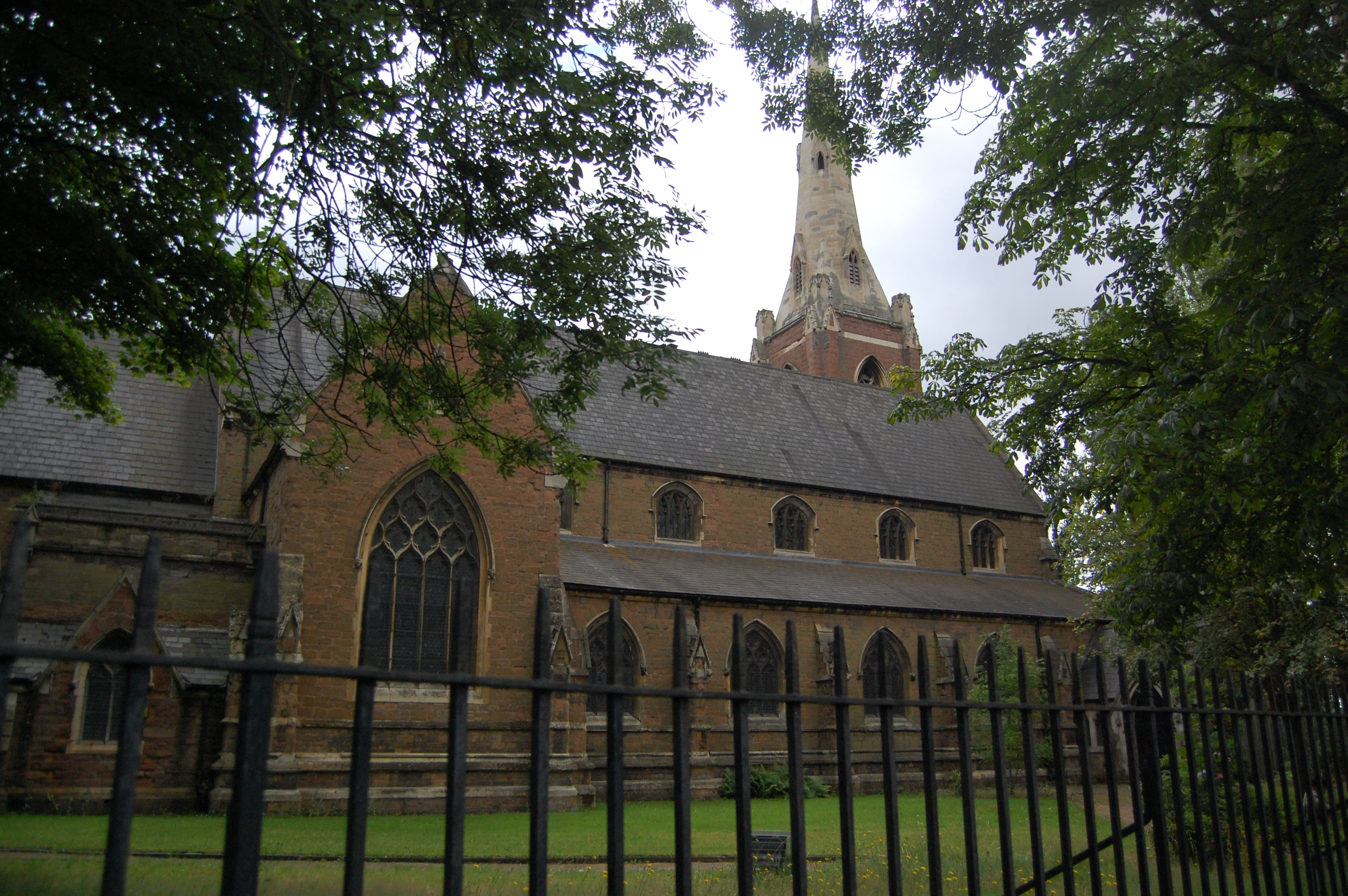
- St Michael's Church
- 52.5002°N 1.9242°W
- OS grid reference: SP 05262 89159
- Location: St Michael's Road, Handsworth, Birmingham,
- Country: England
- Denomination: Church of England
- Churchmanship: Anglo-Catholic

Architecture
- Heritage designation: Grade II listed
- Groundbreaking: 1851
- Completed: 1855

Specifications
- Capacity: 1,000

Administration
- Diocese: Anglican Diocese of Birmingham

Clergy
- Vicar: Vacant

St Michael's Church in St Michael's Road, Handsworth, Birmingham, England, is a Grade II listed, Church of England church, in the Diocese of Birmingham, built in 1851–1855 (and then in Staffordshire), and described as "a major local landmark".

In 1907 part of the parish was taken to form a new parish for St Peter's Church, Handsworth.

It can seat one thousand people, and was built mainly to accommodate workers from local industry.

The foundation stone was laid by William Legge, 4th Earl of Dartmouth, of Sandwell Hall, in 1852. The church was consecrated by John Lonsdale, the Bishop of Lichfield.
