= All Saints' Church, Small Heath (I) =

All Saints’ Church, Small Heath
- All Saints’ Church, Small Heath
- 52°28′5.6″N 1°51′55.9″W
- Location: Small Heath, Birmingham
- Country: England
- Denomination: Church of England

History
- Dedication: All Saints

Architecture
- Architect: A.E. Dempster
- Groundbreaking: 15 September 1882
- Completed: 28 July 1883
- Closed: 1940s

All Saints’ Church, Small Heath was a former parish church in the Church of England in Birmingham.

== History ==
An iron mission church was opened in 1875, and a parish was assigned out of Holy Trinity Church, Bordesley. The foundation stone for the permanent church on Cooksey Road was laid on 15 September 1882. It was built to the designs of A.E. Dempster and the contractor was Barnsley and Sons, Rylands Street North, Birmingham.

The nave, north transept and north aisle opened on 28 July 1883.

Part of the parish was taken in 1924 to form a new parish for St Gregory the Great's Church, Small Heath.

All Saints’ was badly damaged in an air raid during the Second World War and demolished shortly afterwards.

The name of All Saints has re-emerged in Small Heath as during the 1990s a re-organisation of churches in Small Heath was undertaken, and St Aidan's, St Gregory's, St Andrew's and St Oswald's were amalgamated. The new parish decided to retain only St Aidan's Church building, and in 1998 this was renamed All Saints.
