= St Mark's Church, Washwood Heath =

St Mark's
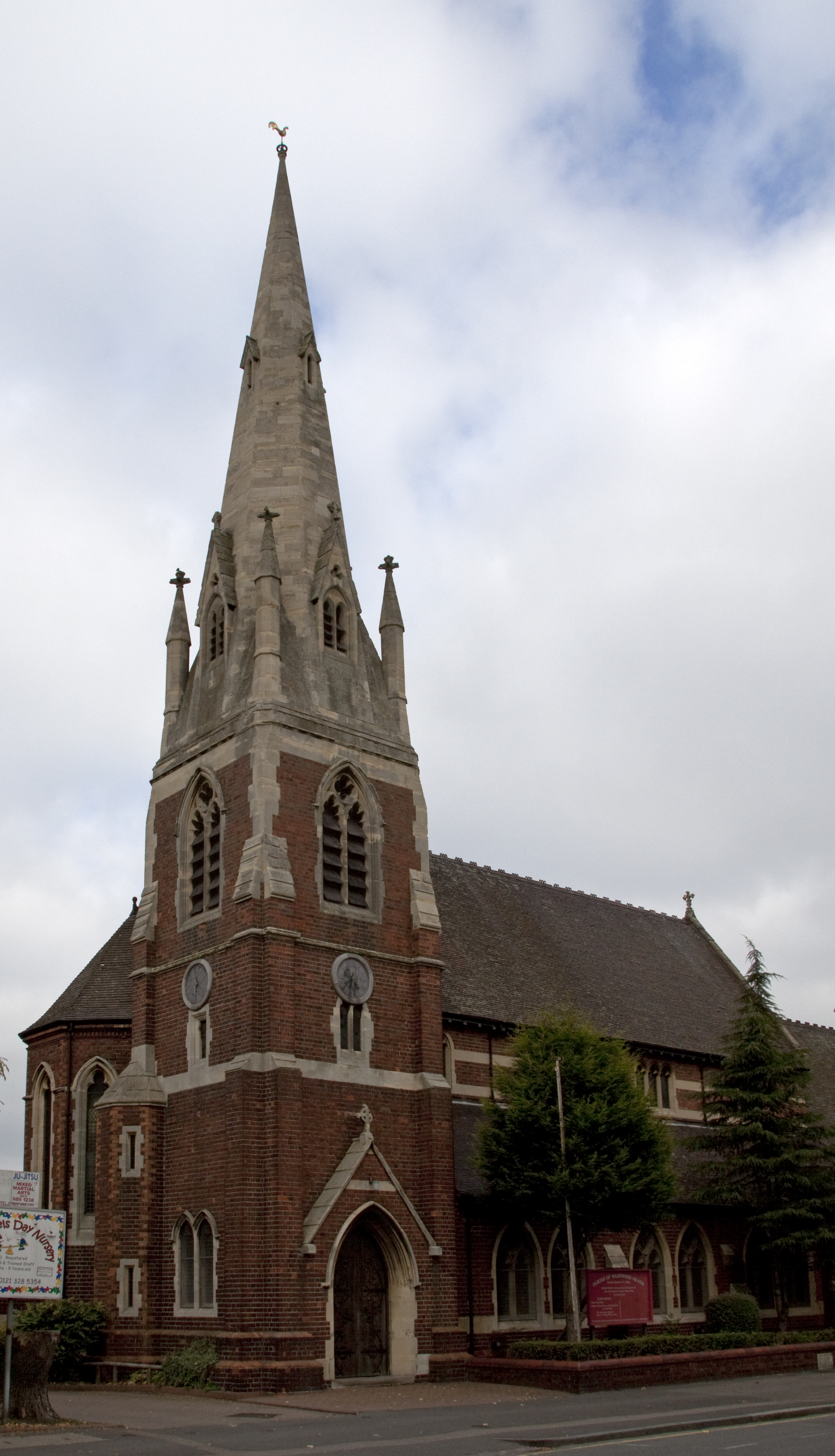
- St Mark's
- 52°29′47.49″N 1°51′2.22″W
- OS grid reference: SP 10309 88750
- Location: Washwood Heath, Birmingham
- Country: England
- Denomination: Church of England
- Churchmanship: Anglo-Catholic

History
- Dedication: St Mark

Architecture
- Architect: J. A. Chatwin
- Groundbreaking: 1890
- Completed: 1899

Administration
- Diocese: Anglican Diocese of Birmingham
- Archdeaconry: Birmingham
- Deanery: Aston
- Parish: St Mark with St Saviour, Saltley

Clergy
- Bishop: Rt Revd Paul Thomas SSC (AEO)
- Rector: Revd Alan Thompson

St Mark's is a parish church in the Church of England in Washwood Heath, Birmingham.

== History ==
Building of the church started in 1890. The church was extended in 1894 with the addition of two bays of the nave with north and south aisles. In 1898 to 1899 a further extension of the nave and aisles was undertaken and a baptistry and steeple were built. The church was consecrated in 1899.

A parish was formed in 1907 when land was taken out of St Saviour's Church, Saltley.

It is under the care of the Bishop of Oswestry and follows the Anglo-Catholic tradition in its liturgy.

== Organ ==
The church contained an organ by F.W. Ebrall. A specification of the organ can be found on the National Pipe Organ Register.
