= John Wall (priest and martyr) =

English Roman Catholic saint

Saint John Wall aka "Joachim of St. Ann" O.F.M.
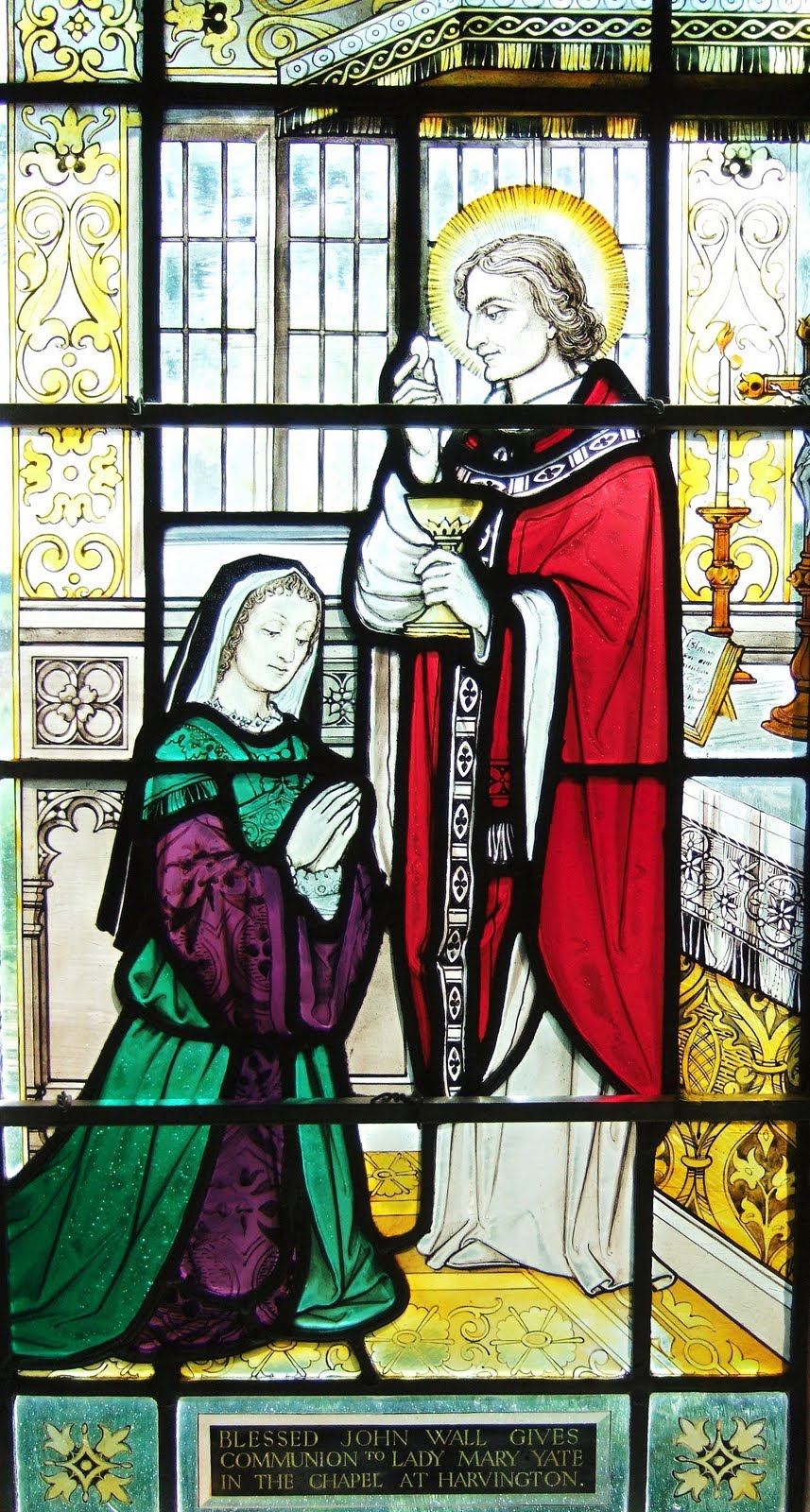
- A stained glass window in Harvington Hall showing the martyr celebrating Mass in a secret room in that house.

Martyr
- Born: c. 1620; Preston, Lancashire, England
- Died: 22 August 1679 (aged 58–59); Worcester, England
- Venerated in: Roman Catholic Church
- Beatified: 15 December 1929 by Pope Pius XI
- Canonized: 25 October 1970 by Pope Paul VI
- Major shrine: Douai, France
- Feast: 12 July (with John Jones); 23 (formerly 22) August (Roman Catholic Archdiocese of Birmingham); 25 October (collectively with Forty Martyrs of England and Wales); 29 October (one of the Douai Martyrs)
- Attributes: martyr's palm, crucifix, chalice, Eucharist, holding a rope or noose, book or bible, sometimes depicted in a Franciscan habit

John Wall, (aliases John Marsh, Francis Johnson or Dormore or Webb, religious name "Joachim of St. Ann") (1620 – 22 August 1679) was an English Franciscan friar, who is honoured as a martyr by the Catholic Church. Wall served on the English mission in Worcestershire for twenty-two years before being arrested and executed at the time of Titus Oates's alleged plot.

== Life ==
He was born in Preston, Lancashire, the son of wealthy and staunch Lancashire Catholics. His brother William, also a priest, became a Benedictine monk. William was later arrested, and condemned for being a priest, but was reprieved and survived. John Wall was sent when very young to be educated at the English College, Douai. As the English government had spies and informers on the continent, Wall used the name "John Marsh".

He entered the English College, Rome, on 5 November 1641 and was ordained a Catholic priest on 3 December 1645. He was sent on the English Mission on 12 May 1648 under the aliases of Francis Johnson, and Dormore. For several years he said Mass for recusant households. He returned to Douai and on 1 January 1651, he joined the Order of Friars Minor at St. Bonaventure's Friary, taking the name Friar Joachim of St. Ann. He was soon named Master of novices, serving in that office until 1656, when he returned to England, under the name Francis Webb and settled in Worcestershire. There he became a Governor (Six Master) of the Royal Grammar School Worcester.

After 22 years of ministry to the Catholics of the area, he was apprehended in December 1678, at Rushock Court near Bromsgrove, where the sheriff's man had come to seek a debtor. He was tendered the Oath of Supremacy and was committed to Worcester Gaol for refusing it. His trial was on 25 April 1679. A man whose vices he had reproved bore testimony to his priesthood, and he received a sentence.

He was then sent to London, and four times examined by Oates, Bedloe, and others in the hope of implicating him in the pretended plot; but was declared innocent of all plotting and offered his life if he would abjure his religion. He was brought back to Worcester and executed on Red Hill 22 August 1679. Wall was a much respected local figure and the crowd's reaction showed that their sympathies were entirely with him. Many of the onlookers, who were mostly Protestants, wept, and the Sheriff reportedly cried out "Will this end Popery? This is the way to make us all Papists!"

He was considered an outstanding academic, perhaps the most intellectually distinguished English Catholic priest of his generation.

== Veneration ==
His quartered body was given to his friends and was buried in the cemetery adjoining the Church of St. Oswald of Worcester, while the head was taken to the Franciscan friary of Douai, to which the martyr belonged.

Previously, his feast day was observed within the Franciscan Order on the date of his death, 22 August. It has been moved and is currently observed on 12 July, a date he shares with his brother friar and fellow martyr, John Jones. In the Roman Catholic Archdiocese of Birmingham, his feast day is celebrated on 23 August. St John Wall Catholic School in Birmingham is named after him.
