= Anthony John Cooke =

British organist and composer (1931–2012)

- Born: 29 January 1931; Birmingham
- Died: 6 October 2012 (aged 81)
- Occupation: Organist

Anthony John Cooke FRCO (29 January 1931 – 6 October 2012) was a British organist and composer.

== Life ==
Born in Birmingham in 1931, he was educated at King Edward VI Aston School, where he later taught. In 1949 he went up to Keble College, Oxford as organ scholar. He left in 1953 with his MA, Bachelor of Music and Fellowship of the Royal College of Organists and commenced his teaching career at Highgate School in North London.

He was later awarded the Archbishop of Canterbury's Diploma in Church Music.

For many years he was Organ Adviser to Ripon and Leeds Diocese.

Cooke died on 6 October 2012.

== Appointments ==
- Organist of St Mary and St Ambrose Church, Edgbaston 1948–49
- Organ scholar of Keble College, Oxford 1949-53
- Organist of St. Germain's Church, Edgbaston 1955–58
- Music Master at King Edward VI Grammar School, Aston 1958-64
- Organist of St Bartholomew's Church, Edgbaston, Birmingham 1958–64
- Director of Music at Leeds Grammar School 1964–89
- Organist of St Wilfrid's Church, Pool-in-Wharfedale.

== Recordings ==
His playing was a feature of the first LP recordings made by Leeds Parish Church Choir under Donald Hunt. He is also on the Huddersfield Choral Society and Black Dyke Band recording Christmas Fantasy on the Chandos label, playing the Huddersfield Town Hall organ.

== Compositions ==
His compositions included works for choir and organ.
