= St Andrew's Church, Handsworth =

St Andrew's Church
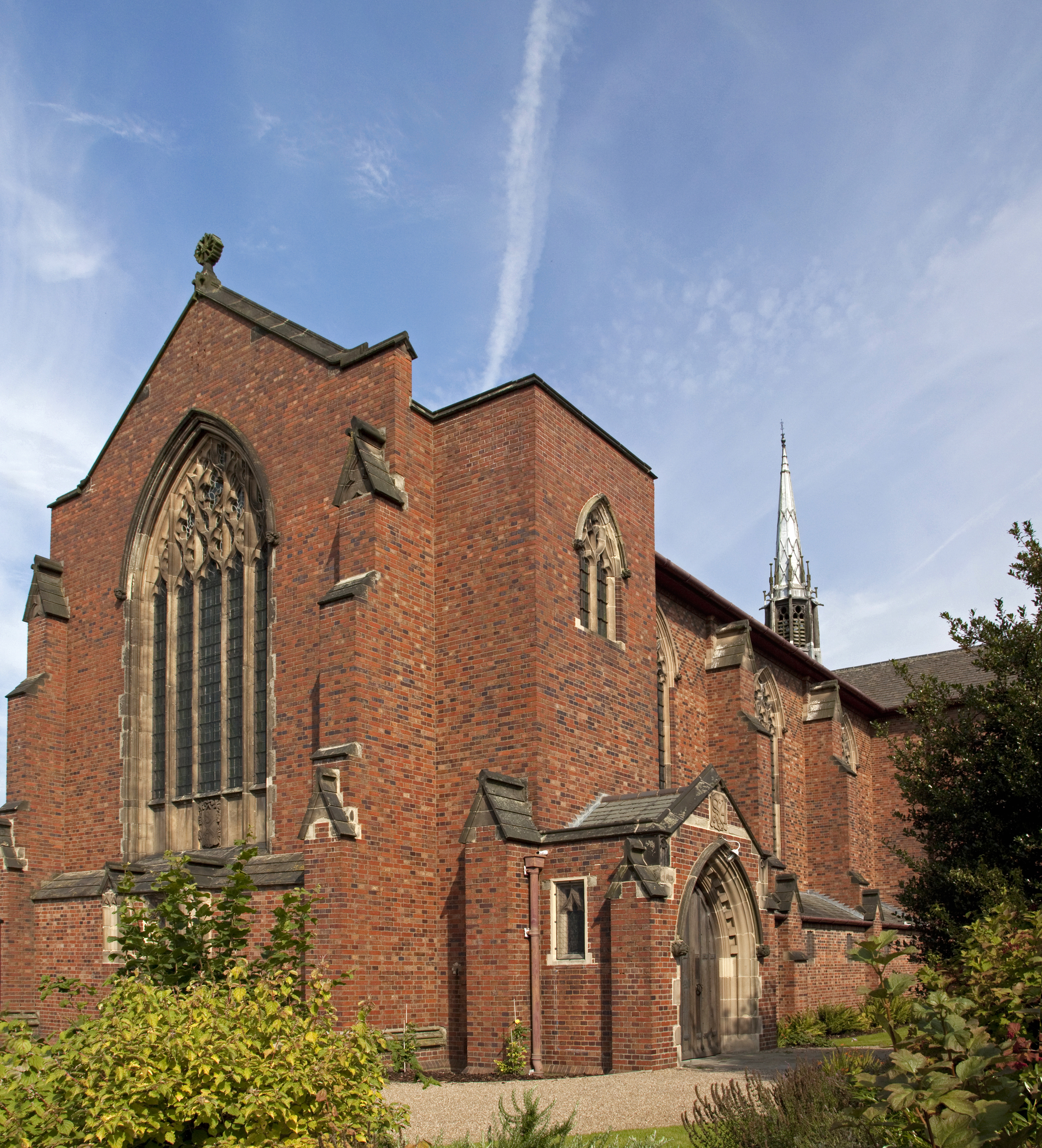
- St Andrew's
- St Andrew's Church
- 52°30′50.73″N 1°56′10.71″W
- OS grid reference: SP 04426 90695
- Location: Handsworth, West Midlands
- Country: England
- Denomination: Church of England
- Churchmanship: Anglo-Catholic
- Website: www.standrews-handsworth.org.uk

History
- Dedication: St Andrew
- Dedicated: 1910
- Consecrated: 1914

Architecture
- Heritage designation: Grade I listed
- Architect: William Bidlake
- Groundbreaking: 1907
- Completed: 1909

Administration
- Diocese: Birmingham
- Archdeaconry: Birmingham
- Deanery: Handsworth
- Parish: Handsworth St Andrew

Clergy
- Vicar: 2023 – Rev. Paskal Clement 2020–2023 – Interregnum 2014–2020 – Rev. Douglas. T. Machiridza 2007–2013 – Re. Edmund. J. Newey

St Andrew's Church, Handsworth is a Grade I listed parish church in the Church of England in Handsworth, West Midlands.

== History ==
The church originated as the mission church of the Good Shepherd. It opened in a temporary building in 1894 as a mission church of St. Mary's, Handsworth. The current building was designed by the architect William Bidlake in the Arts and Crafts style. Work started in 1907 and the building was completed in 1908. The church was dedicated in 1910 and it was consecrated in 1914 when a parish was assigned from St Mary's and St James'.

== Organ ==
The church has a two manual pipe organ by William Bird and Sons of Selly Park. A specification of the organ can be found on the National Pipe Organ Register.

== Choir ==
The church has a traditional, robed, parish Choir whose primary function is to lead the sung mass worship at the main service on Sunday at 10.00 am. The choir consists of a cross section of age groups and is structured using the traditional 'SATB' voices. The choir sing and perform traditional, classical and modern works and rehearse and sing a liturgically suitable anthem each Sunday.
