= Russell Harry Coleman Green =

British organist and composer (1908–1975)

Russell Harry Colman Green FRCO ARCM FRCCO (10 April 1908 – 6 February 1975) was an organist and composer based in England and Canada.

== Life ==
He was born in Norwich on 10 April 1908. He studied at the Birmingham School of Music and with G. D. Cunningham and Herbert Howells.

He conducted the Olton Orchestra from 1926 until 1947, the Birmingham Festival Choral Society from 1945 until 1954, and the Russell Green Choir from 1949 until 1958.

He moved to Ottawa, Canada, in 1958 and died on 6 February 1975 in Saskatoon.

== Appointments ==
- Organist of St Bartholomew's Church, Edgbaston, Birmingham 1933–????
- Organist of First Baptist Church (Ottawa) 1959–1963
- Dean of Music at Acadia University 1963–1965
- Organist at Knox United Church (Saskatoon) 1965–1969
- Organist at Christ Church, Saskatoon 1969–1975

== Compositions ==
His compositions include over 350 songs, around 50 keyboard works, 50 sacred and secular choral pieces, a paean for orchestra, and a cantata, Christus mediator (1962).
