= Berry Hall Farm =

Coordinates: 52°24′53″N 1°45′03″W

- Interactive map of the Berry Hall Farm area
- Former names: Berry Hall
- Alternative names: 'Old' Berry Hall

General information
- Location: Ravenshaw Lane, Solihull, United Kingdom
- Completed: Fifteenth century

Berry Hall Farm is a moated, fifteenth century half-timbered property located on Ravenshaw Lane in central Solihull. Originally named 'Berry Hall' and also known as 'Old' Berry Hall, it was renamed Berry Hall 'Farm' by Joseph Gillott, owner of the Berry Hall estate when he built himself an opulent new home on the estate of the original Hall in the 1870s. Gillott wanted to call his new property 'Berry Hall' and this was his reason for renaming the original 15th-century building.

Despite the name change, the halls were known as 'New' and 'Old' Berry Hall.

Berry Hall Farm is still in existence today and has significantly outlived 'New Berry Hall' which was demolished in the late 1980s.
