= Theodore Stephen Tearne =

Theodore Stephen Tearne (15 December 1857 – 2 February 1926) was an Irish-born organist and composer, who worked in England and Australia.

== Life ==
He was born in Dublin on 15 December 1857, the son of Theodore Sheldon Tearne and Macdonald Stephen.

Tearne graduated Mus Bac in 1880 from Oxford University, attending New College, where he matriculated 5 February 1877. He was a pupil of Samuel Sebastian Wesley at Gloucester Cathedral, and then Sir George Elvey at St. George's Chapel, Windsor.

He was on the board of examiners for the London College of Music, and for the Society of Science, London, and is one of the representatives of the Royal Academy of Music and of Trinity College London.

He married Mary Maud Lee in St. James' Church, Westley on 22 January 1891 They had the following children

- Donna Mary Tearne (1892–1971)
- Theodora Maud Tearne (1897–1970)
- Joyce Debenham Tearne (1899–1991)

Theodore Stephen Tearne died in Sydney, New South Wales, Australia on 2 February 1926. He is buried at Manly Cemetery.

== Appointments ==
- Organist of St Bartholomew's Church, Edgbaston, Birmingham 1889 – 1903
- Organist of St James' Church, Handsworth 1904–08
- Superintendent of Music in the New South Wales Department of Public Instruction. 1908 – ca. 1920

== Compositions ==
His compositions included

- "The Bell Amen Cadence", to be sung at the close of service 1886
- "The Edgbaston Angelus", 1897
- "Gavotte and Musette", 1886
- "Saviour, Before Thy Throne", 1906
