= J. A. Chatwin =

British architect

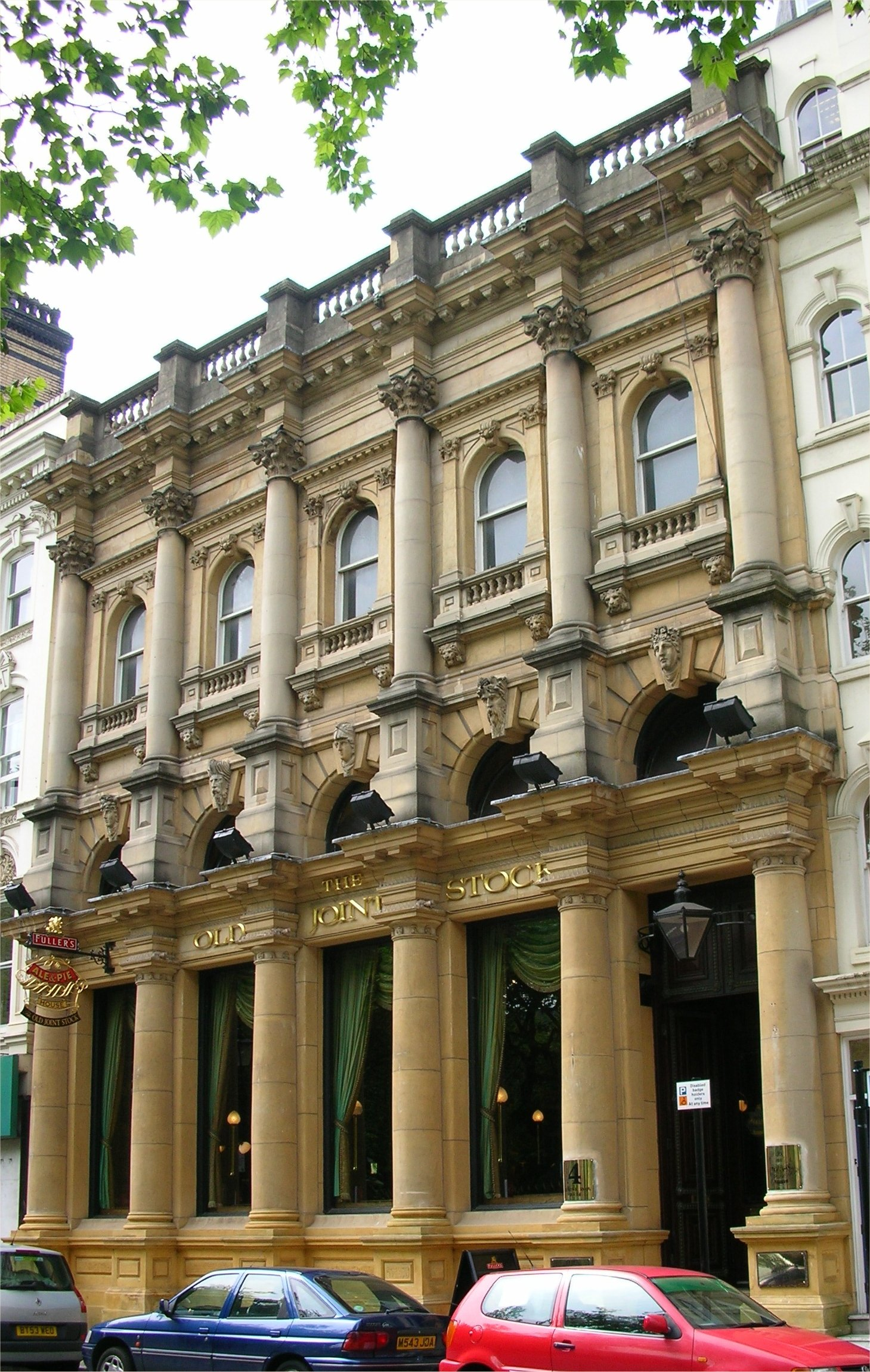
The Joint Stock Bank (now a pub), Temple Row West, Birmingham; it was originally intended to be a library

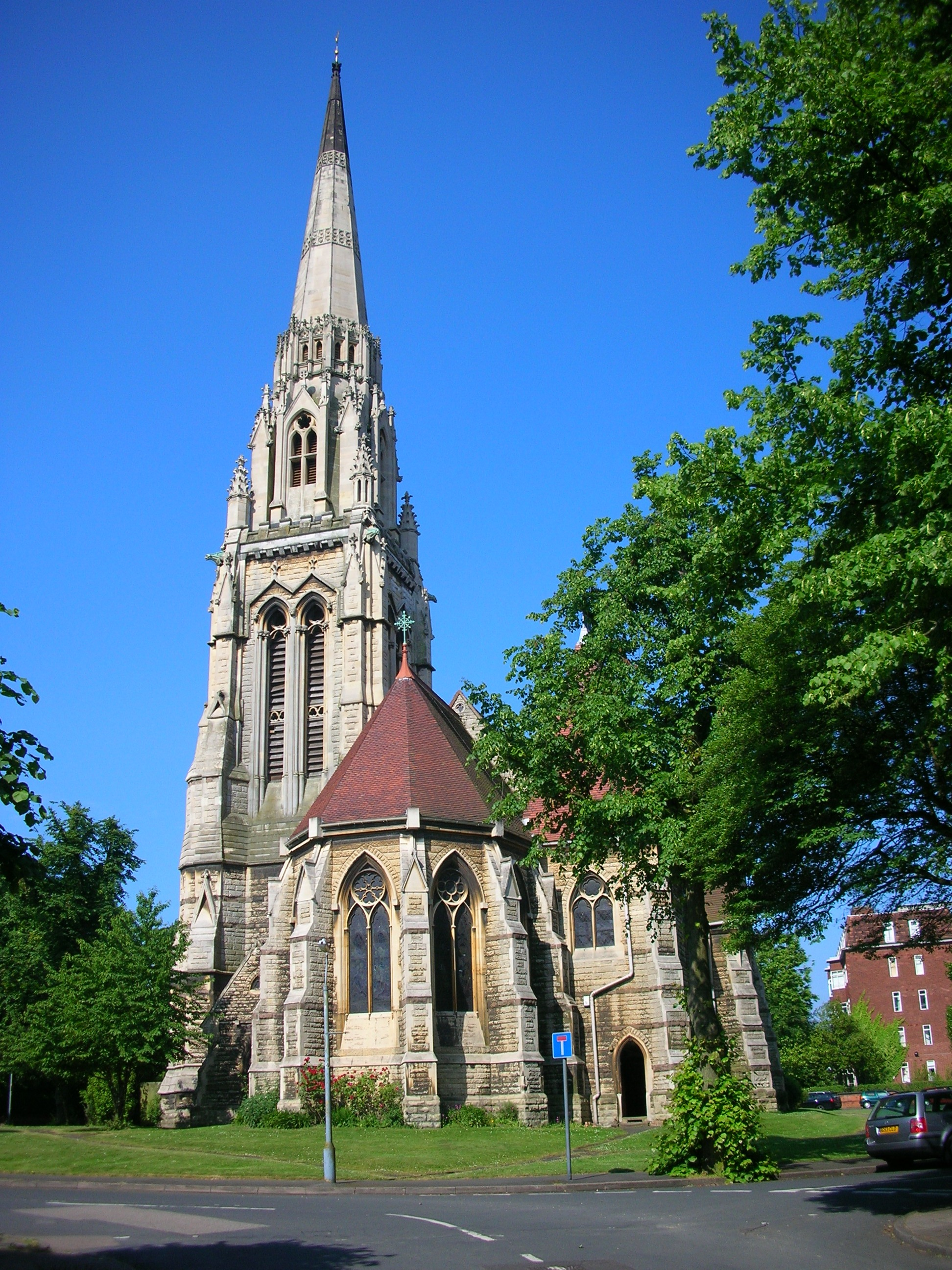
St Augustine's Church, Edgbaston, 1868.

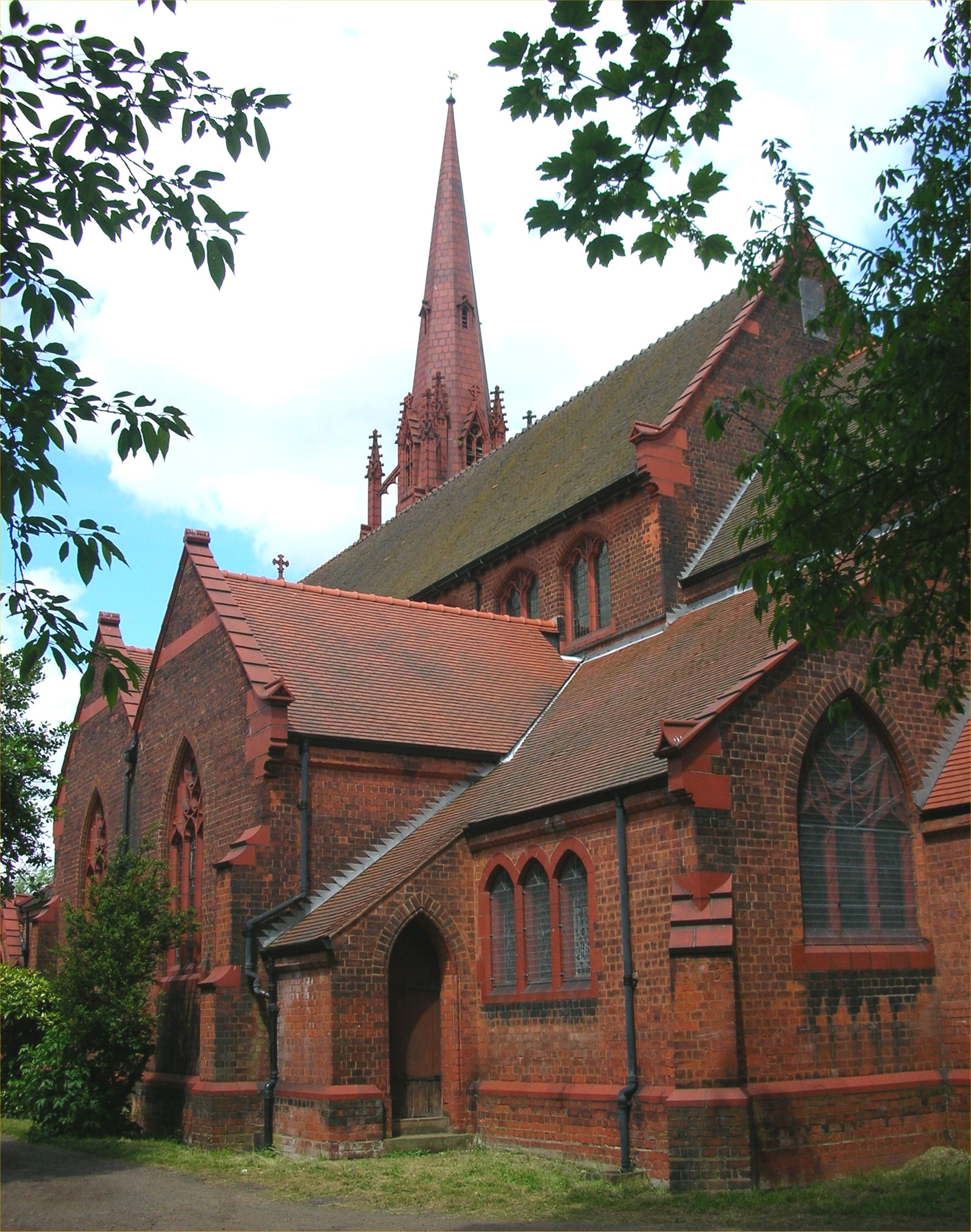
St Mary & St Ambrose, Edgbaston, 1897–98.

Julius Alfred Chatwin FRIBA, ARBS, FSAScot (24 April 1830 – 6 June 1907) was a British architect known for his work on the construction and modification of numerous churches in Birmingham. He practiced both Neo-Gothic and Neo-Classical styles, incorporating detailed carvings and internal fittings into his designs.

== Career ==
Born the son of John Chatwin (1796–1855), a button manufacturer in Great Charles Street, Birmingham, and Harriet née Turner (1793–1848), and educated at King Edward's School on New Street and the University of London, he was known by the name Alfred. He worked from 1846 as an architect for the largest builders in the country, Branson and Gwyther of Birmingham. He was articled to Charles Barry in 1851 and worked with Barry and Augustus Pugin on the Victoria Tower of the Houses of Parliament. He worked again for Gwyther personally on his enterprises in Llandudno, North Wales. In 1855 he opened an office on Bennett's Hill in Birmingham.

From 1864 Chatwin became architect to Lloyds Bank for over thirty years. He designed a library in Temple Row West, Birmingham, in 1862, which became the Joint Stock Bank, now the Old Joint Stock Theatre building. The bank was taken over by Lloyds Bank in 1889.

He was, from 1866, architect to the Governors of King Edward's School and designed the first King Edward VI High School for Girls on New Street. Also from 1866 he worked with his son P. B. Chatwin, who became his business partner in 1897.

He was made a Fellow of the Royal Institute of British Architects (FRIBA) on 30 November 1863; a member of the Royal British Society of Sculptors (ARBS), Royal Society of Arts (RSA); and Fellow of the Royal Antiquary Society of Scotland.

== Family life ==
Chatwin married at St James' Church, Handsworth, a church he partially rebuilt in the 1890s, on 26th October 1869. He is buried with his wife Edith Isabella Chatwin and daughter Isabella Gertrude Chatwin in St Bartholomew's Church, Edgbaston, a church he also partly rebuilt between 1885 and 1889. His gravestone, which also mentions his daughter Grace Constance Chatwin (cremated), along with those of William Hoddinott, Jane Bellis and Catherine Chavasse are subject to a separate Grade II listing.

J.A. Chatwin was the great-grandfather of the writer Bruce Chatwin.

== Works ==
He designed:

- Bingley Hall, 1850 (demolished)
- St Clement, Nechells Park Road, 1857-9 (Chatwin’s first church - demolished 1978)
- Holy Trinity Church, Birchfield, 1860-3, Grade II* listed
- Knutsford Lodge, Edgbaston, 1861, Grade II* listed
- The Joint Stock Bank (later Lloyds Bank, now the Old Joint Stock pub and Old Joint Stock Theatre), 1862–64, Grade II listed
- St Matthew's Church, Duddeston and Nechells, 1866, addition of galleries
- Most of the north side of Colmore Row, after 1866
- St Gabriel's Church, Deritend, 1867-1869
- St Augustine's Church, Edgbaston, 1868, with 185ft spire added later, Grade II* listed
- St Lawrence's Church, Duddeston,1868 (demolished 1951)
- Uppingham School, Rutland, partial works, 1870
- Birmingham Greek Orthodox Cathedral – Dormition of the Mother of God and St Andrew (built as a Catholic Apostolic church), 1872, Grade II listed
- St Martin in the Bull Ring, (except tower and spire), 1872-1875, Grade II* listed
- St Mary's Church, Handsworth, 1876-1880, rebuilt retaining medieval tower, Grade II* listed
- Lloyds Bank, Queen Square, Wolverhampton, 1878-1879, Grade II listed (where Chatwin is commemorated by a blue plaque)
- Church of Saints Peter and Paul, Aston, 1879, (except tower and spire), Grade II* listed
- St Paul's Church, Lozells, 1880, Grade II listed
- School and church, Catherine-de-Barnes, Solihull, 1880
- New Berry Hall,1880 & Berry Hall Lodge, Solihull, 1884, Grade II listed
- St. John's Church, Ladywood, 1881, chancel
- Wolverhampton Art Gallery, 1882, Grade II listed
- School House, Solihull School, 1882, Grade II listed
- King Edward VI Five Ways School 1882-1883
- All Saints' Church, King's Heath, 1883, north aisle
- King Edward VI Aston School, Aston, 1883
- St Philip's Cathedral, Birmingham, 1883-1884, chancel, Grade I listed
- Christ Church, Summerfield, Edgbaston, 1883-1885
- St. Bartholomew's Church, Edgbaston, 1885-1889, new chancel, chapels and north arcade, Grade II listed (where Chatwin was buried in 1907)
- St. Mary's Church, Moseley, 1886-1897, rebuilding, Grade II listed
- St John the Evangelist's Church, Perry Barr, 1888, chancel, vestry and organ chamber
- St Mary’s Church, Bearwood, 1888
- Church of St. Michael and All Angels, Underwood, 1890
- St Andrew's Church, Malmesbury Park, 1890
- St John’s Church, Kidderminster, 1890–94, nave
- St Mark's Church, Washwood Heath, 1890-1899
- St. John's Church, Kidderminster, 1892–1904, chancel, nave and aisles
- St Mary the Virgin, Acocks Green, 1894, chancel
- Bishop Ryder Church, Birmingham, 1894, chancel
- All Saints' Church, Stechford, 1894–1898
- St James' Church, Handsworth, 1895, rebuilding (where Chatwin was married in 1869)
- Church of SS Mary and Ambrose, Edgbaston, 1897–98, Grade II listed
- St Mary, Oldswinford, 1898, chancel
- St James' Church, Aston, 1906 (demolished 1980)
- St Peter's Church, Handsworth, 1907

== Sources ==
- Foster, Andy (2005). Birmingham. Pevsner Architectural Guides. ISBN 0-300-10731-5.
- Blue plaque in Wolverhampton
- Innes-Smith, Robert (1991). St. Martin's in the Bull Ring. Church Guide. ISBN 0-85101-282-5.
- Incorporated Church Building Society - Church Plans Online
- Waterhouse, Rachel (1983). King Edward High School Birmingham 1883–1983.
- Noszlopy, George T. (1998). Jeremy Beach (ed.). Public Sculpture of Birmingham including Sutton Coldfield. Liverpool University Press. ISBN 0-85323-692-5.
- P. B. Chatwin (1952). The Life Story of J. A. Chatwin FRIBA, FSA.Scot 1830-1907. Oxford University Press.
- Bridges, Tim (2009). Phillada Ballard (ed.). Birmingham's Victorian and Edwardian Architects. Oblong. ISBN 978-0-9556576-2-7. Archived from the original on 26 February 2012.
