= St Peter's Church, Handsworth =

St Peter’s Church, Handsworth
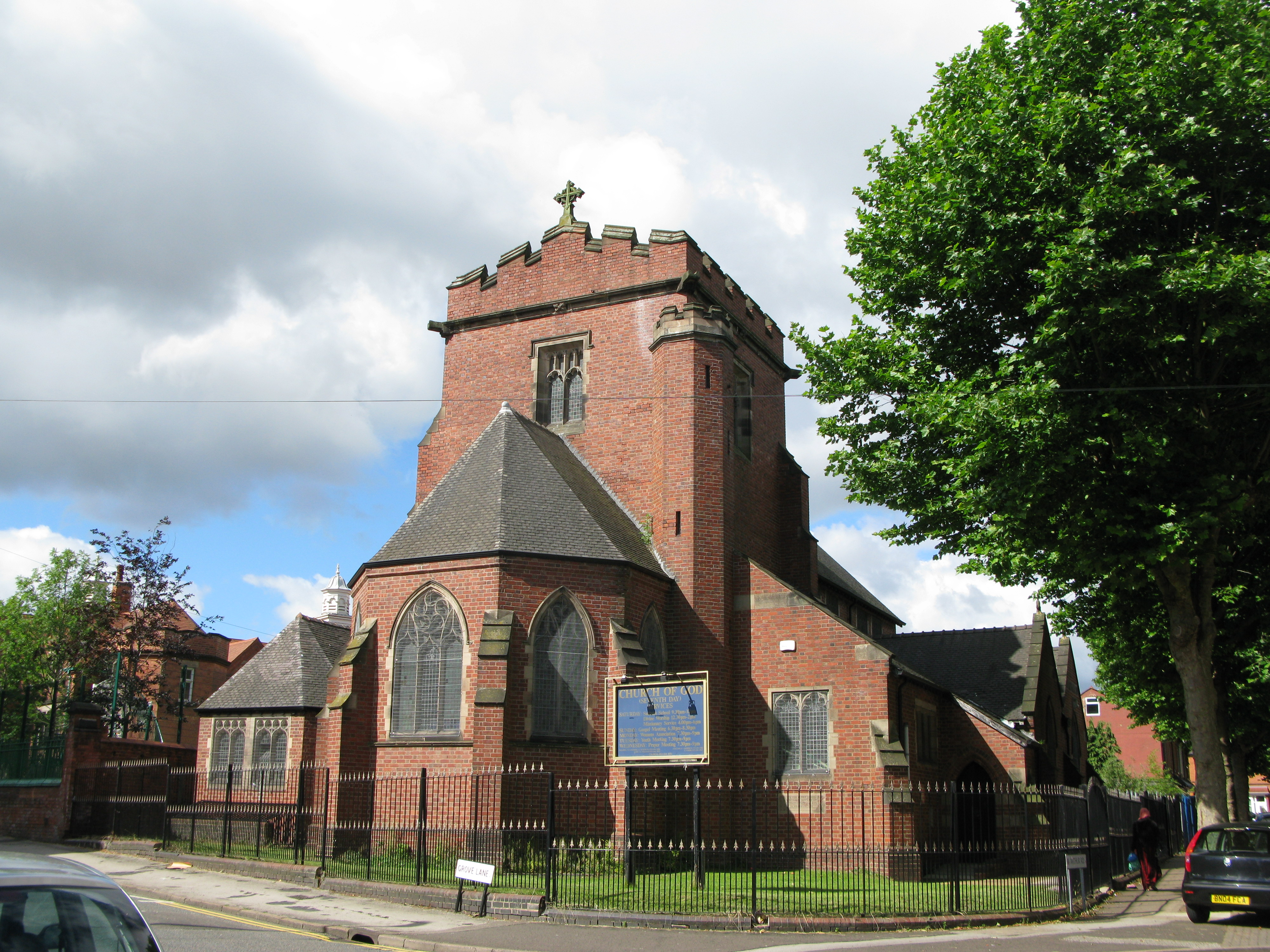
- Former St Peter’s Church, Handsworth, now a church for the Church of God (Seventh Day)
- St Peter’s Church, Handsworth
- 52°30′21.6″N 1°55′57.6″W
- OS grid reference: SP 04648 89782
- Location: Handsworth, West Midlands
- Country: England
- Denomination: Church of God (Seventh Day)
- Previous denomination: Church of England

History
- Dedication: St Peter
- Consecrated: 28 June 1907

Architecture
- Heritage designation: Grade II listed
- Architect: J.A. Chatwin

St Peter's Church, Handsworth is a Grade II listed former Church of England parish church in Birmingham now used by a Church of God (Seventh Day) congregation.

== History ==
St Peter's Church was one of the last churches designed by J.A. Chatwin. It was consecrated on 28 June 1907 by the Bishop of Birmingham and in the same year a parish was assigned to it out of St James' Church, Handsworth and St Michael's Church, Handsworth.

After being declared redundant by the Church of England in 1977 the building was abandoned and eventually became derelict. In the early 1980s it was bought by The Church of God Seventh Day and continues to be used as a place of Christian worship.

== Organ ==
The church contained an organ by William Hill dating from 1846 which had previously been in All Saints’ Church, West Bromwich. It was moved here by William J Bird in 1910. A specification of the organ can be found on the National Pipe Organ Register. When the church was declared redundant in 1977, the organ was moved to St Gregory the Great's Church, Small Heath.
