= New Berry Hall =

New Berry Hall main entrance circa 1900

New Berry Hall from rear garden circa 1900

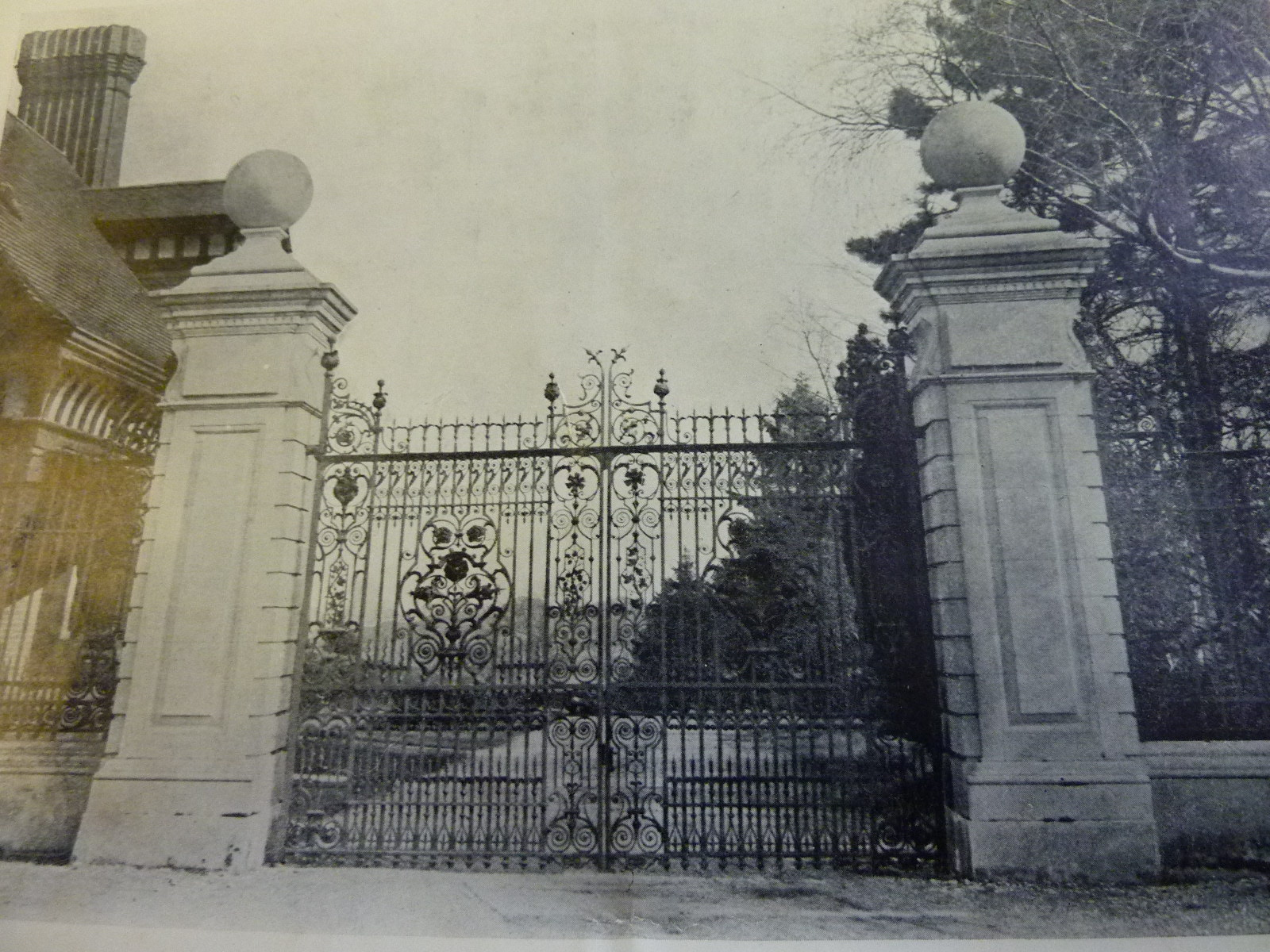
New Berry Hall main entrance gates from Marsh Lane circa 1904

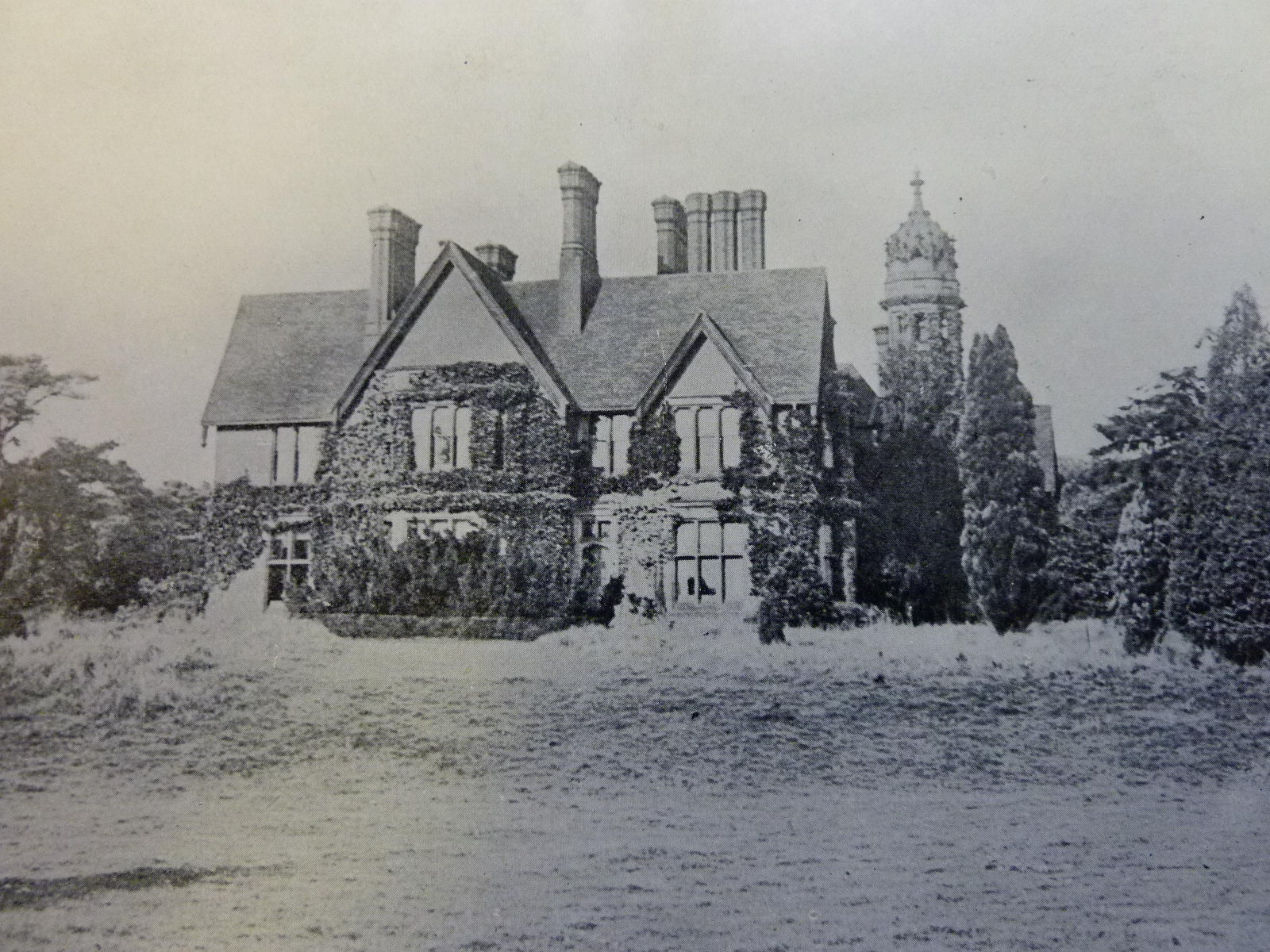
New Berry Hall rear elevation

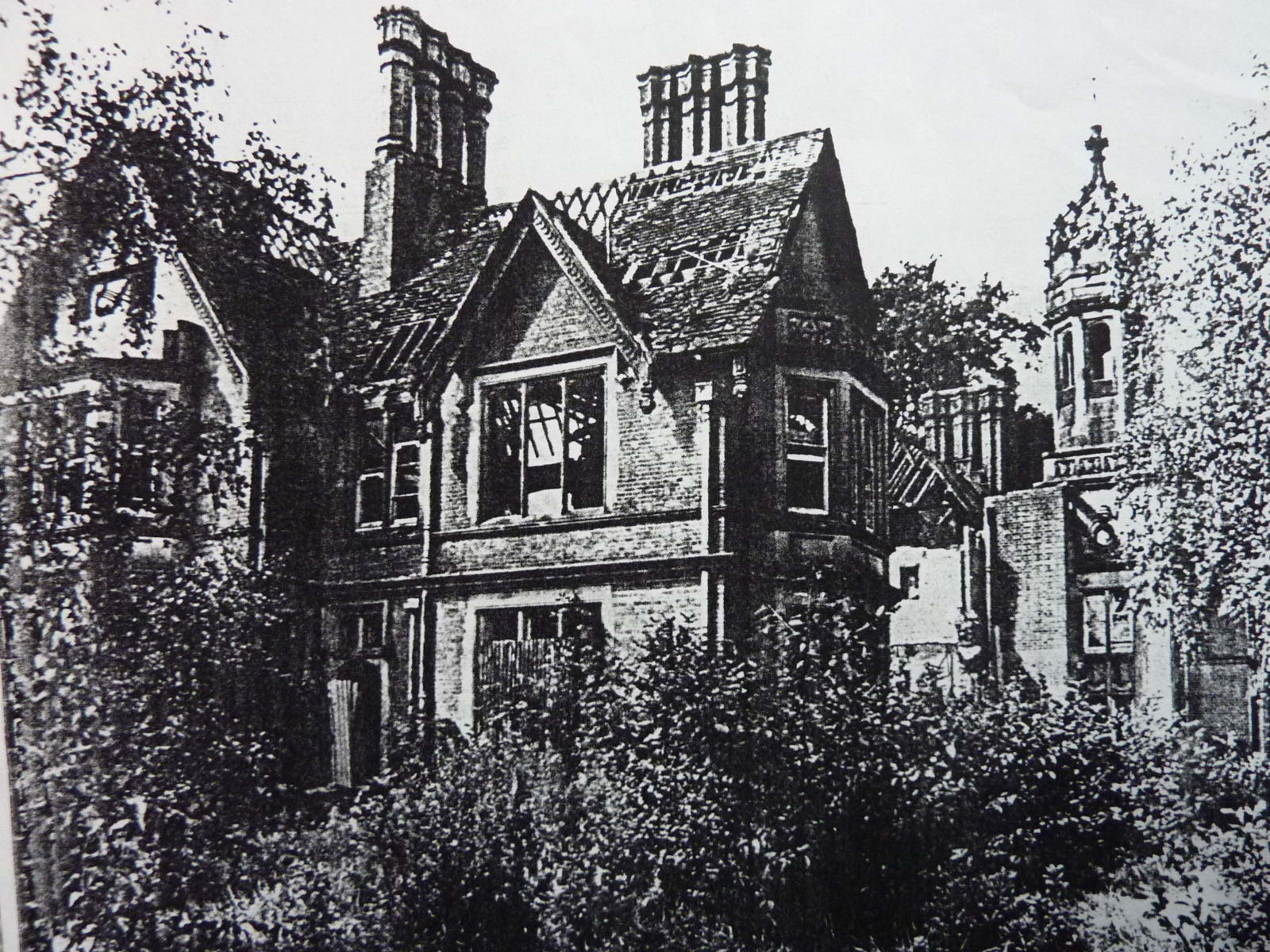
New Berry Hall having fallen derelict circa 1980

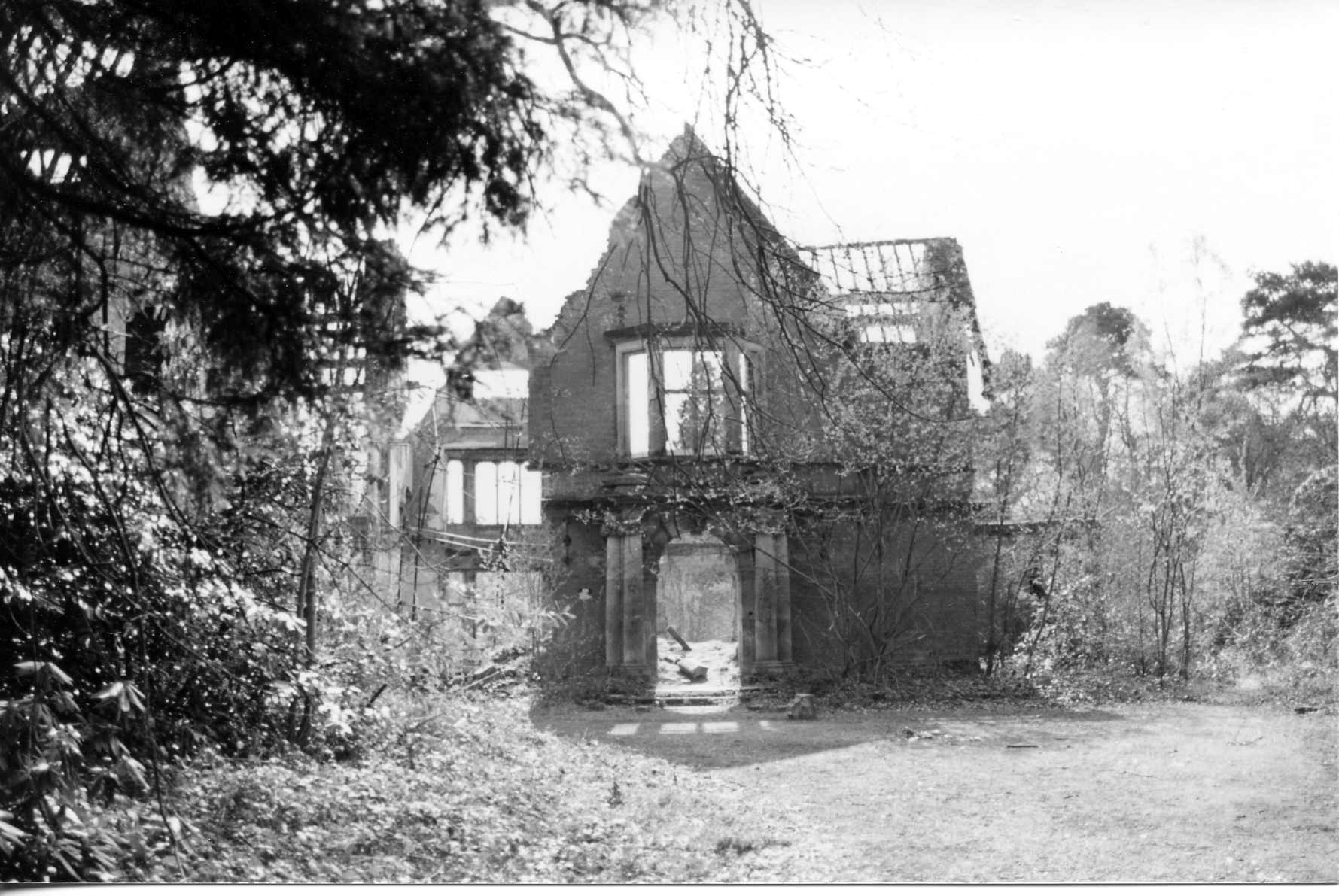
New Berry Hall shortly before demolition early 1990s

New Berry Hall (52.4145°N 1.7544°W), on the outskirts of Solihull, England, was built on the estate of the existing Berry Hall Farm (picture), by the son of the successful Birmingham businessman Joseph Gillott in the late 19th century.

Berry Hall Farm, in whose grounds the new hall was built, is a 15th-century half timbered structure which is still in existence today. Joseph Gillott (Jnr.) renamed the original Berry Hall to 'Berry Hall Farm' in order that he could then call his new palatial residence 'Berry Hall'. However, the newer 1870 Hall was always unofficially known as 'New' Berry Hall.

== History ==
The Hall was designed by J. A. Chatwin and built as a gothic style Victorian mansion on the outskirts of Solihull, Warwickshire. Work commenced in 1870 and was completed in 1880, with South and North Lodges added in 1884 and 1905 respectively. The main entrance was via the South Lodge, from Marsh Lane, through vast iron gates designed by Gillott himself; the lock design incorporated pen nib shapes, alluding to the family business that had made them their fortune. The half-mile driveway still exists, though it is now severed by the main A41 Solihull by-pass.

== Features ==
One of the most imposing features of the new Hall was its tower, based on Tom Tower at Christ Church in Oxford. The house had several grand reception rooms including a dining room, drawing room, library and morning room, seven palatial bedrooms, three dressing rooms, two nurseries and one bathroom in addition to a boudoir and gentlemen's W.C. There were servants quarters including four servants bedrooms, a back staircase, a lumber room and butlers pantry as well as extensive kitchens and cellarage. The large entrance hall was adorned by a vast oak staircase and contained an ancient chimney piece, allegedly from Kenilworth Castle. All of the interior decoration was carried out by Lamb & Co who were renowned for their work on Royal properties. Stained glass windows were supplied by Hardman & Co. of Birmingham.

The grounds were landscaped at vast expense and included the digging, by hand, of a lake. A few hundred feet from the main hall was built an enormous walled rose and vegetable garden, a significant part of which is still present. Along one side of the enclosure was a huge glass house measuring over 80 feet (24 m) in length, incorporating a vinery and peach and nectarine houses. Outside the walled garden was stabling for seven horses, plus coaches.

At the time of construction, the Hall incorporated the latest in technology and conveniences including a gas generating plant to provide for the cooking and lighting needs of the main Hall. The main hall also had running water allowed for by a large cast iron cistern mounted in the loft space which was filled by a hydraulic ram.

== The Owners ==
Gillott and his family lived in this opulent luxury until his death in 1904 whereupon the estate, which comprised Berry Hall Farm, 'New' Berry Hall, Henshaw Hall and Grimshaw Hall in nearby Knowle, as well as several hundred acres, was sold at auction. Gillott's own son bought 'New' Berry Hall and Berry Hall Farm from the sale for £15,000 but barely outlived his father – dying in 1907. Both halls were again sold, this time to a businessman called William Upton who later that same year shot himself in the porch of New Berry Hall. His wife, who remarried, continued to live at the hall until her own death in 1938. The halls were then sold to a Mr. Harold Tippetts from Sutton Coldfield who planned to renovate and refurbish the Hall including the installation of electric lighting. He was the last owner to enjoy living in the hall. He and his family lived at the property until 1957 when the main hall and both lodges were sold at auction to an undisclosed company purchaser.

== Modern times ==
After being sold at auction in 1957, 'New' Berry Hall sat empty while its new owners tried to get planning permission to convert the Hall into a hotel. The wrangling over planning permissions was still ongoing in 1959 when a reporter from the Solihull News visited the grounds after reports received from concerned locals. The reporter found that the once immaculately manicured grounds were now very overgrown; but the owners assured him that the interior of the hall was being maintained. Over the next 20 years the once magnificent Hall fell into disrepair and ultimately dereliction, with several planning applications being refused pursuant to restrictions on the development of green belt land and to the listing of the property on Solihull's local list of historic buildings. In many ways the council's attempts at protecting the site ultimately did the most damage to the future of the Hall. It was demolished on safety grounds in the early 1990s, having been severely vandalised and stripped out.

Both lodges also survive today. The South Lodge on Marsh Lane is Grade II listed. The North Lodge, on Hampton Lane, which had stood boarded up and vandalised for many years, sold at auction in June 2006 for £550,000 in derelict condition and has been fully renovated and extended.

The Gillott family was commemorated in the naming of Gillott Close on an estate of new properties adjacent to the South Lodge on Marsh Lane.

In 2017 the company that have owned the site since purchasing it in 1957 had an application approved to cut down trees within 8 metres of the original footprint of the hall and 2 metres around the remains of the walled gardens. The application states that the reason is to open up the woodland and 'possibly rebuild the Hall'.
