= St Bartholomew's Church, Edgbaston =

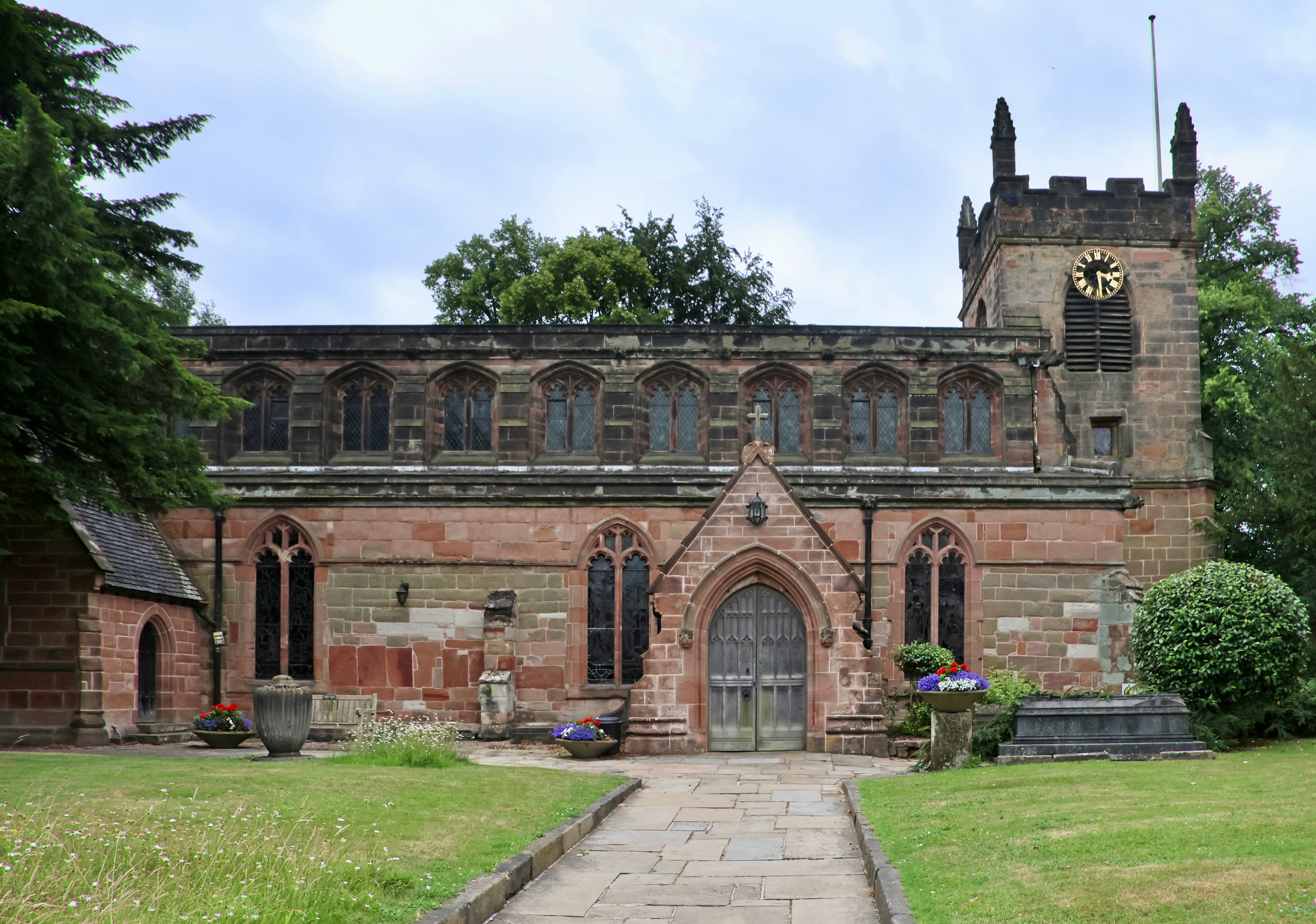
- North elevation in 2023
- St Bartholomew's Church, Edgbaston
- 52.4607°N 1.9171°W
- OS grid reference: SP 05740 84752
- Denomination: Church of England
- Churchmanship: Central churchmanship/Conservative Evangelical

History
- Dedication: St Bartholomew

Administration
- Province: Canterbury
- Diocese: Birmingham
- Deanery: Edgbaston and Warley
- Parish: Edgbaston

Clergy
- Vicar: Revd Charlie Butler

St Bartholomew's Church, Edgbaston, also known as Edgbaston Old Church, is a parish church in the Church of England in Edgbaston, Birmingham.

== History ==
The Grade II listed church is medieval, but was largely rebuilt in the 19th century. The chancel, chapels and north arcade were added in 1885 by J. A. Chatwin, who is buried in the churchyard. His grave monument, along with those of William Hoddinott, Jane Bellis and Catherine Chavasse is Grade II listed.

A memorial to physician and botanist Dr. William Withering, who pioneered the medical use of digitalis (derived from the foxglove), is situated on the south wall of the Lady Chapel, and features carvings of foxgloves and Witheringia solanaceae, a plant named in his honour.

== Bells ==
The tower contains a ring of eight bells, with a tenor weight of 10 long cwt 14 lb (1,134 lb or 514 kg). The earliest four date from 1685. The bells are rung by the Birmingham University Society of Change Ringers during term time.

== Organ ==
A small organ was given to the church by Lord Calthorp in 1837. A Hill organ was built and placed in the gallery in 1857. It was moved to a south east position in the church in 1890. The current organ was rebuilt by Norman and Beard dating from 1956. The organ was extensively damaged by rain water after a theft of lead from the church roof. It was rebuilt at a cost of £70,000 (all funds were raised by the church) and relocated to its current position in the north east of the church in 2012. A specification of the organ can be found on the National Pipe Organ Register.

=== List of organists ===
- John Augustus Sherman
- John Robert Lunn 1846–47
- Stephen Samuel Stratton 1867–75
- Samuel Bath ?–1877
- Herbert Walter Wareing 1881–88
- Theodore Stephen Tearne 1888–1903
- Henry Taylor 1903– ca. 1912 - 1927 ????
- Russell Harry Coleman Green 1933–58
- Anthony John Cooke 1958–64
- A John Flower 1964–1967
- Michael Jones 1967–89
- Bryan Brown 1989–96
- Graeme Martin 1996–97
- Roland Keen 1997–2007
- Father Clifton Graham 2007–10
- David Griffiths 2010– 2024

Position currently vacant

== Burials ==
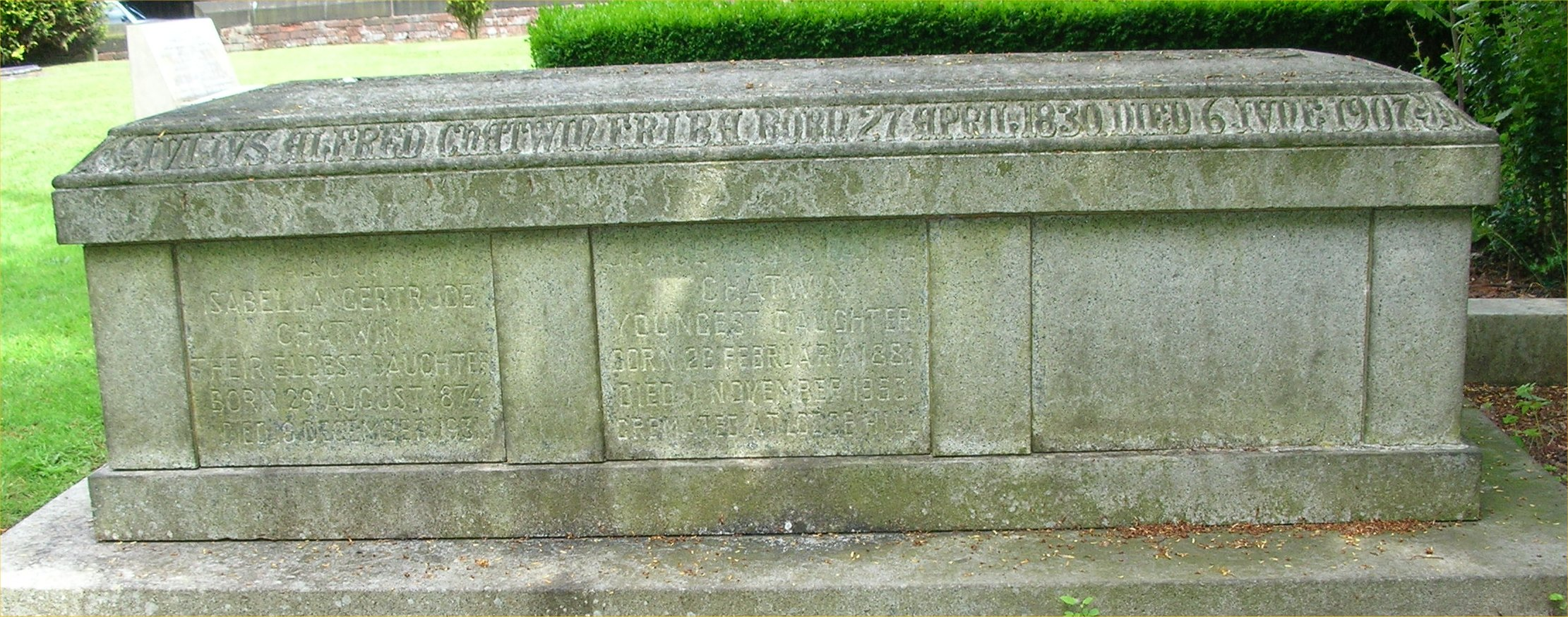
Grave of church architect J. A. Chatwin

- John Thackray Bunce, editor of the Birmingham Daily Post
- J. A. Chatwin, architect
- William Haywood, (ashes) architect and urban designer, and first Secretary of The Birmingham Civic Society
- John Pixell, poet, priest and composer.
- Joseph Henry Shorthouse, 1834–1903, the author of "John Inglesant"

Also in the churchyard is the war grave of a Loyal Regiment officer, Lieutenant Rowland Charles Mason, of World War I.

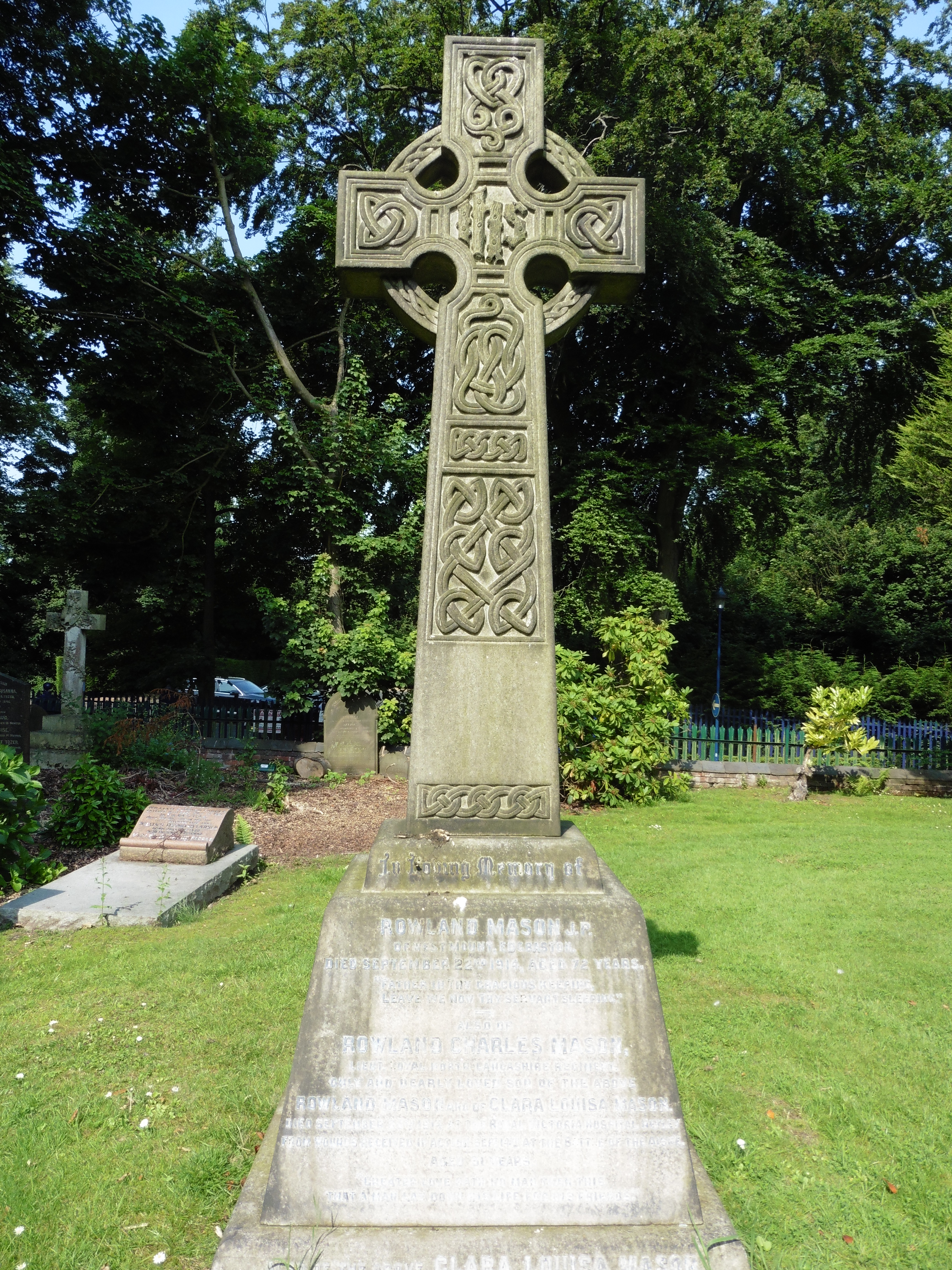
War Memorial
