= St Gregory the Great's Church, Small Heath =

St Gregory the Great’s Church, Small Heath
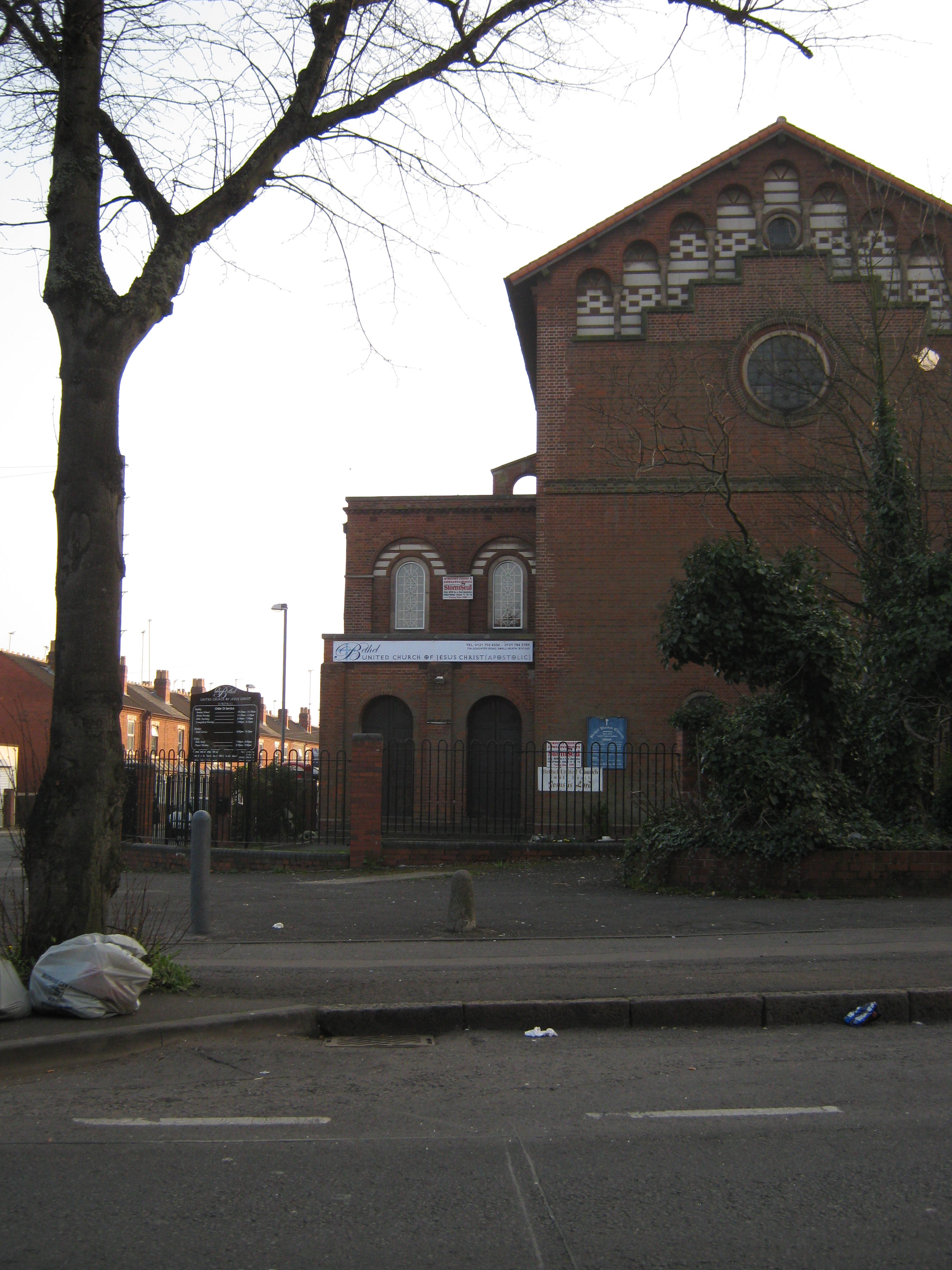
- St Gregory the Great’s Church, Small Heath
- St Gregory the Great’s Church, Small Heath
- 52°27′57.2″N 1°50′46.9″W
- OS grid reference: SP 10506 85314
- Location: Small Heath, Birmingham
- Country: England
- Denomination: Pentecostal
- Previous denomination: Church of England

History
- Dedication: St Gregory the Great
- Consecrated: 13 May 1916

Architecture
- Heritage designation: Grade II listed
- Architect: J. L. Ball
- Groundbreaking: 22 April 1902
- Completed: 1928

St Gregory the Great's Church, Small Heath is a Grade II listed former Church of England parish church in Birmingham now used by the Bethel United Church of Jesus Christ Apostolic.

== History ==
The church originated as an iron mission church known as the Good Shepherd from All Saints' Church, Small Heath (I) in 1900. The foundation stone was laid on 22 April 1902 by Lord Leigh, Provincial Grand Master and built to the designs of the architect J. L. Ball by the contractor John Barnsley and Son. The apse and three bays of the nave were constructed in 1911 - 1912 and the church was dedicated to St Gregory the Great in 1912, and consecrated on 13 May 1916 by the Bishop of Birmingham.

A parish was assigned out of All Saints' Church, Small Heath (I) and St Oswald's Church, Small Heath in 1924. The construction of the west end of the church was completed in 1926 - 1928, under the supervision of Holland W. Hobbiss.

After being declared redundant by the Church of England the building is now used by the Bethel United Church of Jesus Christ Apostolic.

== Organ ==
The church contained an organ by William Hill dating from 1846. It was moved here from St Peter's Church, Handsworth around 1976. A specification of the organ can be found on the National Pipe Organ Register. When the church was closed by the Church of England the organ was removed and was destined for St Mary the Virgin's Church, Little Houghton, Northampton shire.
