= Council House, Handsworth =

Municipal building in Handsworth, West Midlands, England

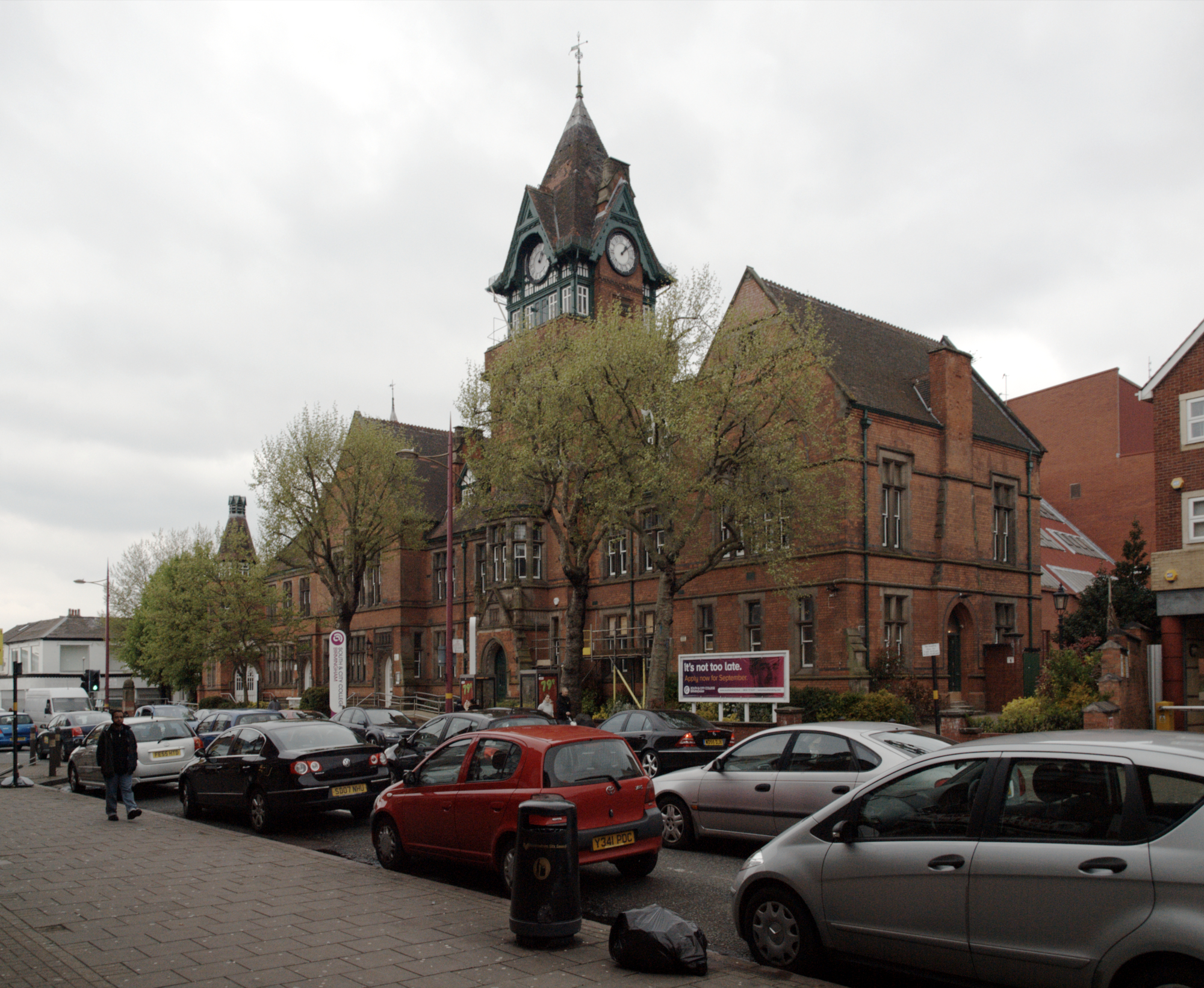
- The building in 2013

- Shown in West Midlands
- 52.5028°N 1.9307°W
- Location: Soho Road, Handsworth

History
- Built: 1879

Site notes
- Architect(s): Alexander & Henman
- Architectural style: Gothic Revival style

Listed Building – Grade II
- Official name: Public Library, Handsworth Council House and Job Preparation Unit
- Designated: 7 July 1982
- Reference no.: 1221174

The Council House is a former municipal building in Soho Road in Handsworth, West Midlands, a suburb of Birmingham in England. The building, which is currently used as a public library and college campus, is a Grade II listed building.

== History ==
Following significant population growth, largely associated with steam engine manufacturing at Soho Foundry, a local board of health was formed in Handsworth in 1877. The board decided to commission a municipal building for its use, to provide Local Board offices, a meeting room for the Board, committee rooms and a large public room, 'together with stables, cart and implement sheds, and other requisite accommodation'. The site selected was on the north side of Soho Road.

The foundation stone for the new building was laid on 30 October 1877. It was designed by Alexander & Henman of Stockton-on-Tees in the Gothic Revival style, built in red brick and terracotta at a cost of £20,662 and was completed in 1879. The design involved a main frontage of 16 bays facing onto Soho Road. The left-hand section of five bays formed a public library and the right-hand section of 11 bays formed the council house. A Fire Engine Station was included at the rear.

The library section, which was asymmetrical, featured a polygon-shaped bay which was projected forward and surmounted by a turret, and there was an arched doorway in the right-hand bay. The library opened, 'with a collection of about 5,000 volumes' on 1 May 1880; it quickly grew and the building was extended in 1891.

The council house section, which was broadly symmetrical, featured a five-stage tower in the central bay, flanked by connecting sections of two bays each, and by end sections of three bays each (which were slightly projected forward and gabled); the other bays were generally fenestrated with bi-partite or tri-partite mullioned and transomed windows. The tower had an arched doorway in the first stage, an oriel window in the second stage, lancet windows in the third and fourth stages, with machicolations above, and a timbered clock in the fifth stage. The clock was by the local firm of clockmakers, W. F. Evans; it sounded the hours and quarters on three bells, made by a Birmingham bellfounder, James Barwell.

In 1894, the board was succeeded by Handsworth Urban District Council, which used the Council House as its offices, but the building ceased to be the local seat of government when area was annexed by Birmingham City Council in 1911.

The council house was subsequently leased to the Handsworth School of Dress Design, which was a branch of the Birmingham Government School of Design. The Birmingham Government School of Design became part of Birmingham Polytechnic in 1971. In the late 1970s, the vacant building was acquired by Handsworth Technical College (later City College Birmingham), which merged with South Birmingham College to form the Handsworth Campus of South and City College Birmingham in 2012.

== See also ==
- List of libraries in Birmingham, West Midlands
