= Handsworth, West Midlands =

Area of Birmingham, England

Coordinates: 52.5135°N 1.9394°W

Handsworth
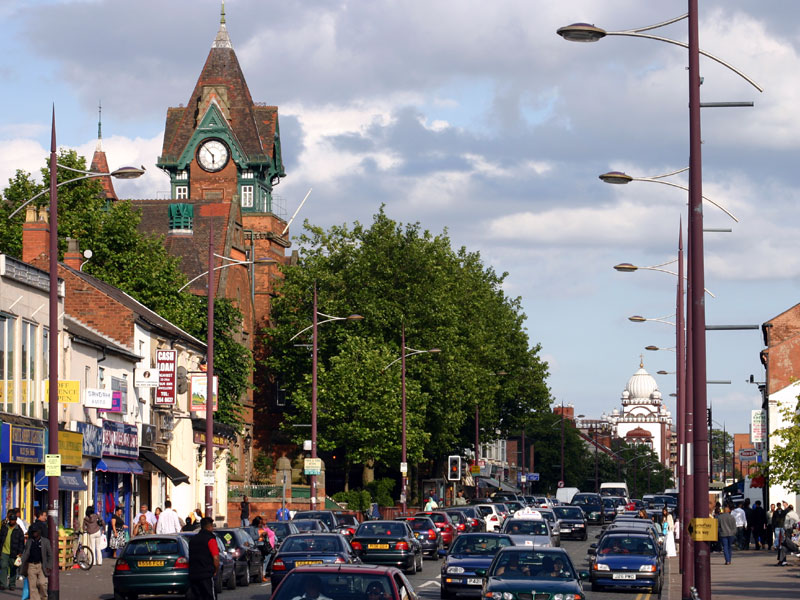
- Soho Road

- Location within the West Midlands
- Population: 11,820 (2021 census)
- Language: English
- OS grid reference: SP 040 896
- Metropolitan borough: Birmingham
- Metropolitan county: West Midlands
- Region: West Midlands
- Country: England
- Sovereign state: United Kingdom
- Post town: BIRMINGHAM
- Postcode district: B20/B21
- Dialling code: 0121

Handsworth (grid reference SP035905) is an inner-city area of Birmingham in the county of the West Midlands, England, with Great Barr and Perry Barr to the north, and Aston to the east, Historically in Staffordshire, it was made an urban district in 1894, and became part of the city of Birmingham in November 1911.

Handsworth lies just outside the modern-day Birmingham City Centre and near the town of Smethwick.

In 2021 the ward had a population of 11,820.

== History ==
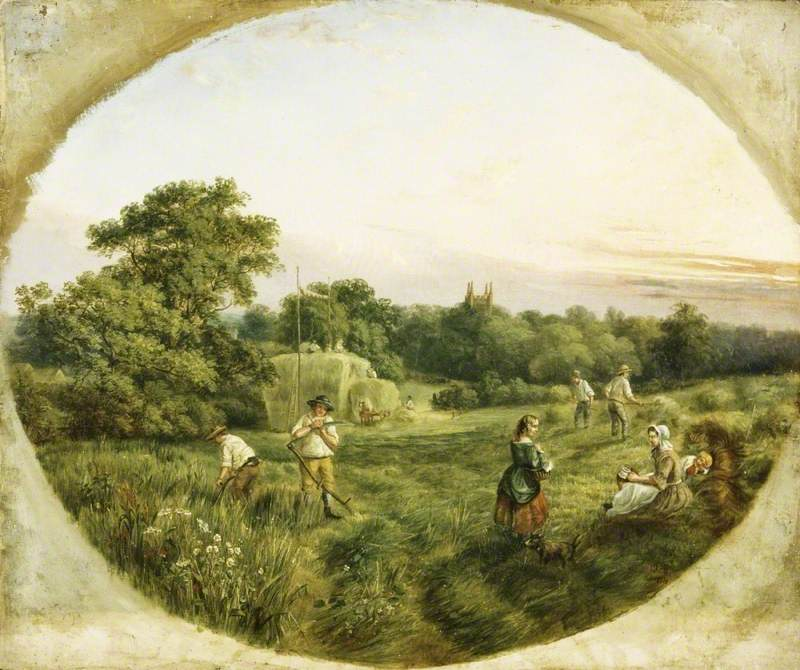
Hay-Making, Handsworth (1859) by William Ellis

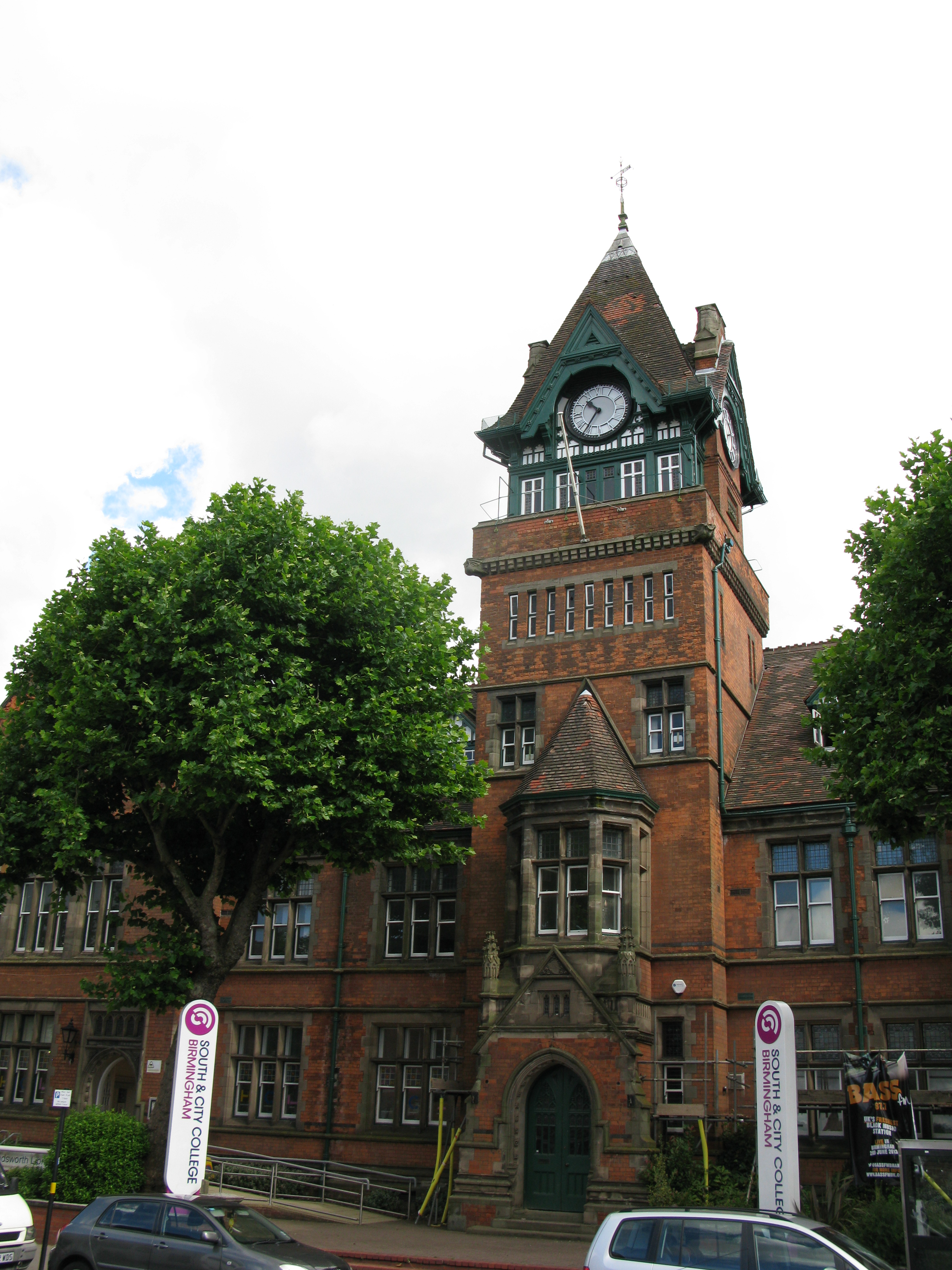
The Council House, now used as a public library and college campus

The name Handsworth originates from its Saxon owner Hondes and the Old English word weorthing, meaning farm or estate. It was recorded in the Domesday Survey of 1086, as a holding of William Fitz-Ansculf, the Lord of Dudley, although at that time it would only have been a very small village surrounded by farmland and extensive woodland. One of the oldest buildings in Handsworth is the Old Town Hall which dates from 1460.

Historically in the county of Staffordshire, it remained a small village from the 13th century to the 18th century, served by the parish church of St Mary. Accommodation was built for factory workers, the village quickly grew, and in 1851, more than 6,000 people were living in the township. In that year, work began to build St James' Church, initially as a chapel-of-ease to St Mary's. Later St Michael's Church was built as a daughter church to St James'. In the census of 1881, the town was recorded as having approx. 32,000 residents. By the census of 1911, this had more than doubled to 68,610. The Council House, in Soho Road, now used as a public library and college campus, was completed in 1879.

The development of the built environment was sporadic and many of Handsworth's streets display a mixture of architectural types and periods – among them some of the finest Victorian buildings in the city. Handsworth has two grammar schools – Handsworth Grammar School and King Edward VI Handsworth School (for girls). St Andrew's Church is a listed building in Oxhill Road which also held Sunday school classes in a small building on the corner of Oxhill Road and Church Lane. It also contains Handsworth Park, which in 2006 underwent a major restoration, the vibrant shopping area of Soho Road, and St Mary's Church which has memorials to Birmingham's foremost pioneers of the Industrial Revolution - James Watt, Matthew Boulton and William Murdoch, all of whom were parishioners in Handsworth. The 1901 Red Lion public house was grade II* listed in 1985, but has been empty since 2008 and is considered "at risk".

In 1894 Handsworth became an urban district, on 9 November 1911 the urban district was abolished and merged with the County Borough of Birmingham and Handsworth parish was transferred from Staffordshire to Warwickshire. In 1921 the civil parish had a population of 75,145. On 1 October 1930 the parish was abolished and merged with Birmingham.

Birmingham historian Dr. Carl Chinn noted that during the Second World War the boundary between Handsworth and the outlying suburb of Handsworth Wood marked the line between being safe and unsafe from bombing, with Handsworth Wood being an official evacuation zone, despite being at least ten miles away from any countryside that might now qualify as "green belt" land, and being on the periphery of many "high risk" areas. During the Second World War, West Indians had arrived as part of the colonial war effort, where they worked in Birmingham munitions factories. In the post-war period, a rebuilding programme required much unskilled labour and Birmingham's industrial base expanded, significantly increasing the demand for both skilled and unskilled workers. During this time, there was direct recruitment for workers from the Caribbean and the area became a centre for Birmingham's Afro-Caribbean community.

A tram depot was erected near Birmingham Road, next to the border with West Bromwich, during the 1880s, and remained in use until the tram service ended in 1939. Although it has since been demolished, a replica of the depot was created later in the 20th century at the Black Country Living Museum in Dudley.

== Boulton and Watt ==
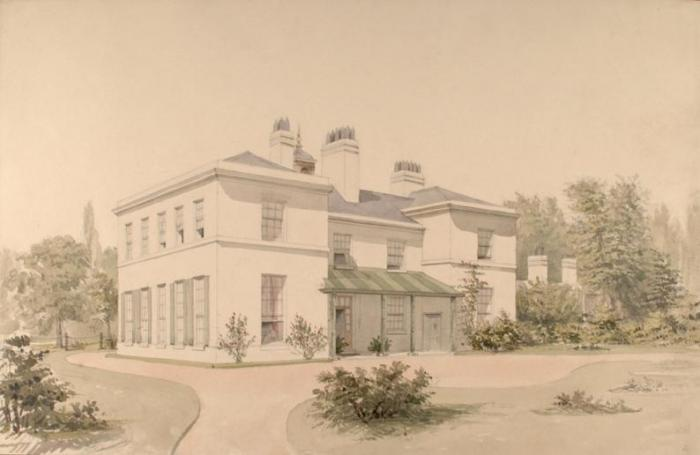
An 1835 painting of Heathfield Hall, by Allen Edward Everitt

Matthew Boulton's Soho Manufactory was set up on the northern edge of Handsworth, on Handsworth Heath. It operated from 1766 to 1848, and was demolished in 1863. Boulton commissioned Samuel Wyatt to design his nearby house Soho House, which is now a museum.

In 1790, Heathfield Hall, also designed by Wyatt, was built for Boulton's business partner, the engineer James Watt. Watt died in the house in 1819, and was buried at nearby St Mary's Church. In the 1880s engineer George Tangye bought the hall and lived there until his death in 1920. From 1927 the hall was demolished and the lands redeveloped. What was the Heathfield Estate is now the land that comprises West Drive and North Drive. Watt's workshop from the house was dismantled and rebuilt in the Science Museum, London.

== Civil unrest, social issues and community ==
A riot occurred in 1981, during which similar riots took place in Brixton (London), Chapeltown (Leeds), and Toxteth (Liverpool). The 'sus' law (Vagrancy Act 1824) saw black youths being disproportionately stopped, searched and arrested by the police, on the grounds of mere 'suspicion' of possible illegal activity; this, along with high unemployment and social alienation, was a key element of the backdrop to the 1981 riots. The subsequent Scarman report (1981) concluded that the riots were "essentially an outburst of anger and resentment by young black people against the police". A similar social backdrop of tensions and hostility towards the police existed during the rioting of September 1985 (which lasted for two days, beginning in Lozells Road, Lozells, and spreading into Handsworth) to which this unrest was ascribed.

After the 1985 riots and a change in perception of British suburban integration, community relations were reviewed. Local government worked to improve community relations as a way of managing both racial and cultural differences. Encouragement was provided by arts organisations such as West Midlands Ethnic Minority Arts Service; its director, Pogus Caesar, photographed the riots, and Black Audio Film Collective produced the 1986 film Handsworth Songs.

There was further unrest in 1991 and 2005; with a fatality occurring during the 2005 riot. The 2011 England riots also spread to the Handsworth area.

The Guardian's online article "Riots don't happen without a reason" (August 2011) seeks to explore the context and histories of these inner-city riots, since the 1980s; emphasising the need for improvements in the relationship between the community and the police.

In the 2010s neighbourhood schemes and developments have helped to improve the area. Businesses in the area, particularly on Soho Road have contributed towards schemes in partnership with council. Soho Road, Holyhead Road and Soho Hill is within a Business Improvement District (BID) area.

A number of initiatives promoting community cohesion exist within this multicultural community. The Handsworth Community Choir includes singers from the area. The Handsworth Park Community Garden opened in July 2017. The community website 'Inside Handsworth', shares community news, events and stories.

In October 2025, the Shadow Secretary of State for Justice Robert Jenrick described Handsworth as "one of the worst-integrated places, slum-like, and had no visible white faces". Kemi Badenoch, Conservative party leader and leader of the opposition defended these remarks in the context of the 2025 Birmingham bin strike. In response to the comments, local residents described Handsworth as a "flourishing area", a "lovely area", and that it is "very diverse", while others said that the area did feel like a slum and that "there could be more done to help it".

== Demographics ==
The 2021 United Kingdom census reported a population of 11,814. Ethnically 91.3% (10,787) of the population were an ethnic minority, with 58.4% South Asian including 25.1% Pakistani, 23.1% Indian, 10.2% Bangladeshi, 16.0% Black (8.2% Black Caribbean, 7.8% black African), 8.7% White, 3.4% mixed, 0.4% Chinese and 6.5% other ethnic groups.

== Governance ==
As of 2026, the ward of Handsworth is represented by one Green Party councillor on Birmingham City Council: Ed Freshwater.

== Musical legacy ==
Handsworth has produced some notable popular musical acts: Steel Pulse (whose first studio album Handsworth Revolution is named after the area), Joan Armatrading, Pato Banton, Benjamin Zephaniah, Swami, Apache Indian, Ruby Turner and Bhangra group B21. In addition, heavy metal band Black Sabbath's lead guitarist and songwriter Tony Iommi, Steve Winwood, pop singer Jamelia and progressive rock drummer Carl Palmer were born in Handsworth.

The tenor Webster Booth was born in Handsworth in 1902, and began his singing career as a child chorister at St Mary's Church. Together with his duettist wife Anne Ziegler, he became a mainstay of West End musicals and World War II musical films. A BBC Showbiz Hall of Fame article described him as "possessing one of the finest English tenor voices of the twentieth century."

== Events ==
Handsworth Park has hosted numerous events: The Birmingham Tattoo, The Birmingham Festival (both originally called Handsworth- rather than Birmingham). The Handsworth Carnival grew out of the Flower Show and Carnival; Caribbean-style carnivals began in Handsworth Park, in 1984, with a street procession via Holyhead Road. In 1994 the carnival was held in Handsworth Park for the last time. The following year it was moved from the park out onto the streets of Handsworth, since which time it has been known as the Birmingham International Carnival. In 1999, it was again held in a park, but this time in Perry Park.

== Education ==
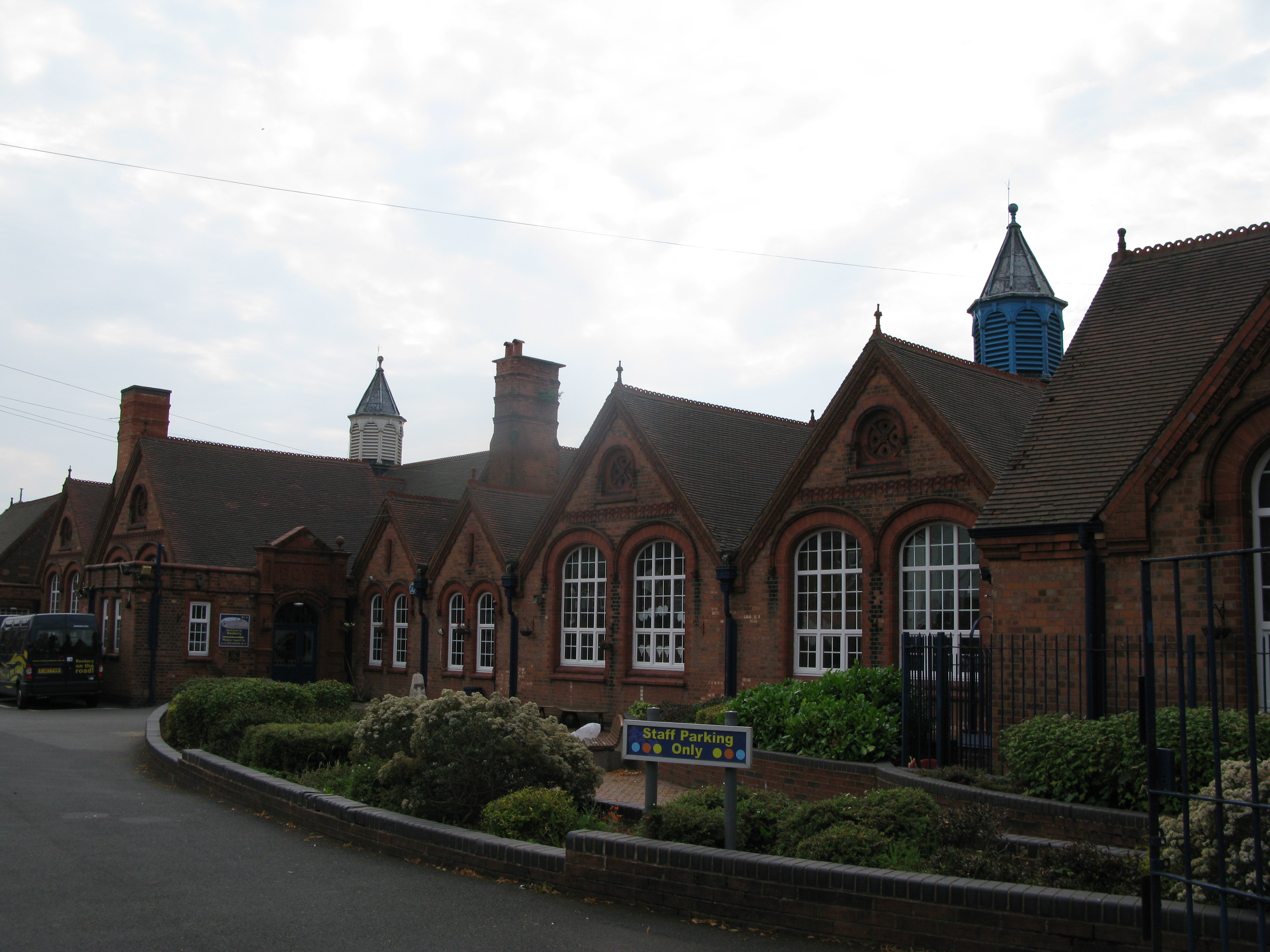
Rookery School, opened 1899

Among education providers is the Rookery School, a 100-year-old mixed state primary school, still housed largely in its original buildings. The school has 456 pupils on roll. These were opened in 1899 to the designs of the architect Edward Holmes.

Secondary schools include Handsworth Wood Girls' Academy, Holyhead School, St John Wall Catholic School, also, selective state schools such as King Edward VI Handsworth Grammar School for Boys and King Edward VI Handsworth School (girls).

== Notable people ==
- Hurvin Anderson (born 1965), British painter, born in Handsworth
- Joan Armatrading (born 1950), singer-songwriter and musician, grew up in the Brookfields area, now part of Handsworth. She attended Canterbury Cross School
- Francis Asbury, born in Handsworth, bishop of the Methodist Episcopal Church
- Pato Banton, reggae singer
- Henry Barber, Birmingham businessman whose bequest founded the Barber Institute of Fine Arts
- Harold Blackham (1903-2009), humanist author and activist grew up in Handsworth
- Webster Booth, operatic tenor, born Handsworth, 1902.
- William Booth, counterfeiter known as the 'Perry Barr forger', buried at St Mary's Church
- Matthew Boulton (1728–1809), lived in Soho House, buried at St Mary's Church
- Harry Samuel Bickerton Brindley, engineer and businessman
- Arthur Edwards (1863–1927), architect, buried at St Mary's Church
- Francis Eginton, stained glass maker, buried in St Mary's Church
- Ian Emes, animator and film director
- Roy Fisher (1930-2017), poet and jazz pianist
- Bert Freeman (1885–1955), England international footballer was born in Handsworth
- Harry Freeman, music hall performer, buried in St Mary's Church
- Kash Gill, retired British professional kickboxer and former four-time world champion
- Anne Heywood (1931-2023), actress prolific in films and TV, was born in Handsworth
- David Hinds (born 1956), lead singer of reggae group Steel Pulse, grew up in Handsworth
- Mr Hudson, singer
- Apache Indian, dancehall artist
- Tony Iommi, guitarist and founding member of heavy metal band Black Sabbath, was born in Handsworth
- Jamelia (born 1981), singer-songwriter
- Bunny Johnson, former British Heavyweight boxing champion
- Conrad Küchler, German émigré and engraver, buried at St Mary's Church
- William McGregor, founder of the Football League, buried at St Mary's Church
- Bitty McLean, reggae singer
- M1llionz (born 1998), rapper
- Darren Moore, footballer
- Jimmy Moore, England international footballer was born in Handsworth
- Bill Morris migrated to Handsworth from Jamaica. He later led the TGWU and after retirement was ennobled as Baron Morris of Handsworth.
- William Murdoch (1754–1839), inventor, developed the use of coal gas for illumination and a pioneer in the development of steam-power, buried at St Mary's Church
- Carl Palmer (born 1950) drummer and percussionist. with bands including The Crazy World of Arthur Brown, Atomic Rooster, Emerson, Lake & Palmer, and Asia.
- George Ramsay (1855–1926), Secretary/Manager of Aston Villa in the most successful period of the club's history. Buried at St Mary's Church
- Tommy Roberts, professional footballer
- Malkit Singh, Punjabi folk singer
- Daniel Sturridge, professional footballer, attended St Mary's C of E Primary School
- John and Joan Taylor, founders of Grosvenor Road Studios
- Albert Toft, sculptor
- Edith Tolkien, wife of J.R.R. Tolkien
- Ruby Turner (born 1968), soul and R&B singer
- Barbara Walker, artist
- James Watt (1736-1819), inventor and mechanical engineer, buried at St Mary's Church
- Caroline Watts (1868–1919), painter and illustrator
- James Tibbits Willmore (1800-1863), engraver
- Steve Winwood (born 1948), rock musician
- Benjamin Zephaniah (1958-2023), poet and writer, grew up in Handsworth

== Transport ==
The Birmingham Canal Navigations Main Line Canal passes through the area, as does the former London, Midland & Scottish Railway main line between Birmingham and Wolverhampton. The West Midlands Metro has a stop at Handsworth Booth Street. The area is also served by National Express West Midlands bus services 11A, 11C, 16, 74 & 101.
