= Joseph Phillips =

Joseph Phillips or Joe Phillips may refer to:

== Sports ==
- Joseph Phillips (Australian cricketer) (1840–1901), Australian cricketer
- Joseph Phillips (Barbadian cricketer) (1891-1958), Barbadian cricketer
- Joseph Phillips (English cricketer, born 1881) (died 1951), English cricketer
- Joe Phillips (English cricketer, born 2003), English cricketer
- Joseph Phillips (field hockey) (1911–1986), Indian Olympic field hockey player
- Joseph Phillips (rugby league) (1924–1969), New Zealand rugby league and rugby union player
- Joe Phillips (American football) (Joseph Gordon Phillips, born 1963), American football defensive tackle and shot putter

== Other fields ==
- Joseph Phillips (judge), American jurist and politician
- Joseph Phillips (Wisconsin politician) (1825–1906), mayor of Milwaukee, Wisconsin
- Joseph C. Phillips (born 1962), African American actor and conservative Christian commentator
- Joe Phillips (born 1969), American comic book artist

== See also ==
- Joker Phillips (Joe Phillips, born 1963), American football coach
