= Dorothea Phillips =

English social organiser (1886-1973)

- Dorothea Phillips in a 1951 newspaper
- Born: Dorothea Mary Land; 2 April 1886; Halifax, West Yorkshire, England
- Died: 22 September 1973 (aged 87); Great Somerford, Wiltshire, England
- Other name: Mrs J H Phillips
- Spouses: Joseph “Joe” Herbert Phillips (m. 1912; death 1951)
- Children: 3
- Relatives: Mark Phillips (grandson); Albert Joseph Moore (great uncle); Henry Moore (great uncle); John Collingham Moore (great uncle)

Dorothea Mary Phillips (2 April 1886 – 22 September 1973) was an English social organiser. From 1951 to 1958 she represented Oldbury Parish on the Atherstone Rural Council. She was the grandmother of Mark Phillips and great-niece of the painter Henry Moore R.A.

== Early life and family ==
Phillips was the daughter of William Henry Land, the managing director of Jess’ Quarry, Hartshill, and Kate Eliza Land née Moore. She was born in Halifax and had one sister, Sybil Catherine Land. Her great-grandfather was the portrait painter William Moore and her great-uncles included the artists Albert Joseph Moore, Henry Moore and John Collingham Moore.

She married Joseph "Joe" Herbert Phillips (1881–1951) on 10 April 1912 at Holy Trinity, Hartshill. They lived at Oldbury Grange in Atherstone. He was the son of William Garside Phillips, an early managing director of Ansley Hall Colliery, a role that Joe had assumed from 1905 until nationalisation in 1947. They had three children:

- Joseph Anthony Moore Phillips, who married Lady Katharine Fitzalan-Howard, daughter of 15th Duke of Norfolk
- Peter William Garside Phillips (1920–1998) whose son, Mark Phillips, married Anne, Princess Royal
- Dorothea Flavia Phillips, who was awarded an MBE (Military Division) in 1943.

Phillips was a painter, children’s clothes designer, horsewoman and “all-round athlete”. She was a regular follower of the Atherstone hunt. In 1958 she moved to Great Somerford, Wiltshire. In 1963 she made a “remarkable recovery from a serious internal operation” at a Bath hospital.

She died in September 1973 in Wiltshire, and was buried alongside her husband in the family vault at St Laurence Church, Ansley. Amid great secrecy, her funeral was attended by Captain Mark Phillips and his then fiancée, Princess Anne. “Elaborate precautions” were taken to ensure that the funeral did not become a “royal funfair”.

== Service ==
Phillips was involved with many local and national organisations, including:

- Ansley Women’s Institute, president for 25 years
- Atherstone Grammar School, patron
- Baby Welfare of Hartshill and Chapel End, committee member
- Chapel End and District Nursing Association, trustee
- National Air Raid Precautions Animals Committee (NARPAC) for Nuneaton and District, district organiser
- Nuneaton Hospital “Good Samaritan” fund, president
- Nuneaton Women Conservatives, Hon. treasurer
- Women’s Voluntary Services (WVS) for Oldbury district, representative
- Young Women’s Christian Association, patron

In 1924 she led the Duke of York, the future George VI, on a tour of the newly opened Warwickshire Miners’ Convalescent Home at Higham Grange. In 1934 she and her husband donated a “finely carved old chair” to the Atherstone Rural District Council Chamber.

Her war service included the Land Army, fire-watching and supporting Warwickshire’s war supply service. In 1942 she “hit upon a novel idea in order that she might raise money for the provision of emergency kits for men serving on destroyers” by selling flowers from her garden at the weekly market in Nuneaton. She donated £50 to both the Merchant Navy Comfort League and The Mission to Seamen.

When her husband died in 1951, Phillips took his place on the Atherstone Rural Council as the representative of Oldbury Parish, a position she held for seven years.
