= Ethel Angell =

English artist

- Ethel Angell from a 1931 newspaper article
- Born: Ethel Elizabeth Angell; 22 July 1889; Abbots Ripton, Cambridgeshire
- Died: 31 January 1972 (aged 82); Coventry, Warwickshire
- Occupation: Artist

Ethel Angell (22 July 1889 - 31 January 1972) was an English flower and landscape artist and teacher. She had paintings accepted into the 1931 and 1946 Royal Academy of Arts exhibition.

Ethel was the oldest of five children born to Eliza and Thomas Angell, a coach trimmer. She taught at Ansley School and lived at Ansley Common Warwickshire. She was living at Hartshill when she died in 1972.

== Painting career ==
Angell studied painting in Bath, Somerset with Alfred Jones (1851-1928) and then with John Anthony Park, ROI, RBA (1880-1962) at the Nuneaton Art School.

In 1931 she had a painting Zinnias, painted while on holiday in Brittany, accepted into the Royal Academy of Arts (RA) exhibition. It was the first time she had submitted her work to be considered. Of her success she said, “I consider myself very lucky, considering the thousands sent from all parts of the world by artists who do nothing else.” She had a subsequent painting, The Harbour at High Tide, accepted for the 1946 RA exhibition.

She exhibited with the Coventry and Warwickshire Society of Artists (CWSA) in 1930 and 1931. She had four paintings, including At Midday and Leafy Warwickshire in the Nuneaton Museum & Art Gallery in 1947. She also exhibited with the Royal Birmingham Society of Artists (RBSA) and the Royal Institute of Oil Painters (ROI).
