= Ansley, Warwickshire =

Village in Warwickshire, England

Coordinates: 52°31′16″N 1°33′33″W

Ansley
- Location within Warwickshire
- Population: 2,598 {2021}
- OS grid reference: SP301914
- Civil parish: Ansley
- District: North Warwickshire
- Shire county: Warwickshire
- Region: West Midlands
- Country: England
- Sovereign state: United Kingdom
- Post town: NUNEATON
- Postcode district: CV10
- Police: Warwickshire
- Fire: Warwickshire
- Ambulance: West Midlands

Ansley is a civil parish in Warwickshire consisting of Ansley, Ansley Common, Church End, Birchley Heath and, previously, Ansley Hall Colliery. In 2021, the parish had a population of 2,598.

Ansley is on the River Bourne, a tributary of the River Tame. The parish is 526 ft above sea level. The Arley Tunnel runs underneath Ansley village. Built in 1864 it forms part of the Birmingham to Leicester railway line.

== Name ==
Some suggest that the etymology of the name Ansley is a derivation of the Old English ansetleah, with ‘anset’ meaning isolated hermitage and ‘leah’ (ley) meaning wooded pasture. Many place names in the area end with ‘ley’, including Arley, Fillongley, Astley, Hurley, Baxterley, Witherley, Corley, Binley, Allesley, Hinckley and Keresley. This is likely a result of the "sporadic clearing of the woods" (specifically the Forest of Arden) that originally covered the area, and the gradual creation of new settlements preceding and following the Norman Conquest.

Others believe the name to come from ãnstiga, with ‘ãn’ meaning one and ‘stig’ meaning path. Ansley appeared as Hanslei in the Domesday Book (1086). Other later derivations have included Anesteleye (1235), Anstle (1316), Ansteley (1416), Anceley (1658), Anestelay and Anseley.

The name Ainsley is derived from Ansley.

== History ==
The earliest evidence of human settlement in the area consists of a round barrow – an artificial mound concealing a grave – dating from the Bronze Age. Located near where Ansley Hall stands, the mound was excavated and lowered in the mid-twentieth century.

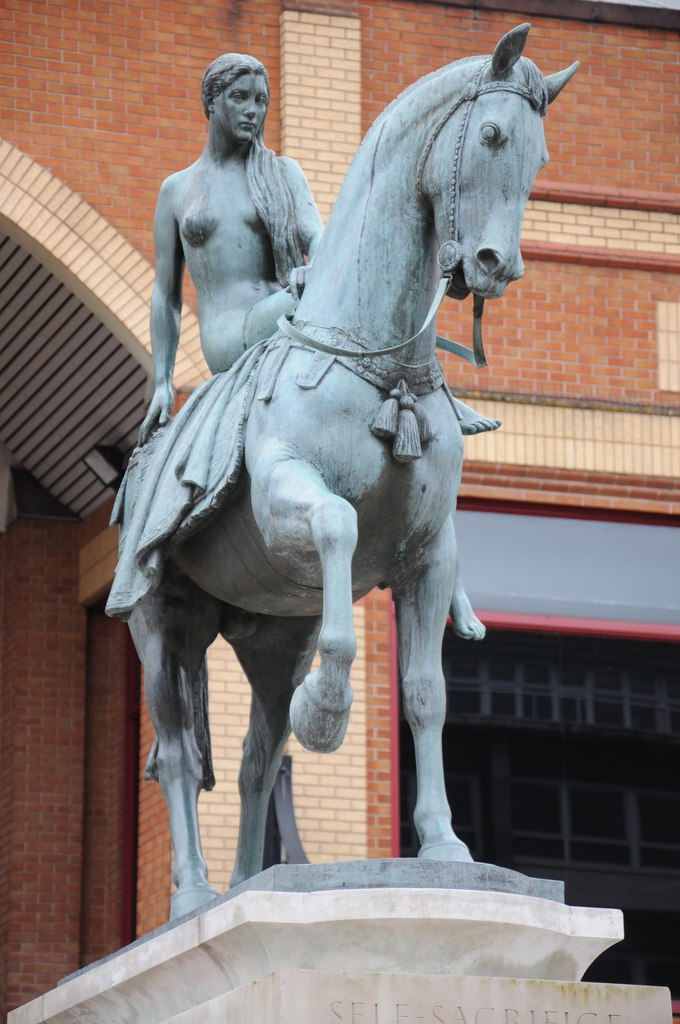
Lady Godiva, tenant-in-chief of Ansley from 1057

Before the Norman Conquest, the principal landowners of the region were Leofric, Earl of Mercia and his family. Ansley’s Domesday Book entry lists a population of 6.5 households and 13 villagers. The settlement was part of the Hemlingford Hundred of Coleshill, Warwickshire, in the subdivision of Atherstone. After Leofric’s death in 1057 the title of Lord and tenant-in-chief passed to his wife, Lady Godiva. The Lord of the Manor was Nicholas the Bowman, a Norman soldier rewarded for his service during the conquest.

It was probably William II (c.1057-1100) who gave Ansley to Hugh d'Avranches, Earl of Chester, (c.1047-1101). In the early 12th century Ansley passed, through marriage, to the Earl of Arundel, however the manor and its land was given to his tenant, William de Hardreshulle (Hartshill), Lord of Hartshill. When Hardreshulle died, his eldest son, Robert, inherited Ansley. In the 13th century, Ansley and neighbouring Hartshill were granted by the Hardreshulle family to an unknown knight in exchange for 40 days’ service a year to the King. Towards the end of the century, the land passed by marriage to the Colepeper family (also spelt Culpeper).

Ansley Castle belonged to the Hastings family during the reign of Henry I (1100-1135). It was licensed to be crenellated by Johannes de Hastings in 1300 but was deserted soon after. By the turn of the 17th century, the antiquarian William Camden (1551-1623) wrote of "mouldering towers covered with ivy". The castle no longer stands.

A few traces of a separate Norman castle built by Hugh Hardreshulle in 1125 are still visible.

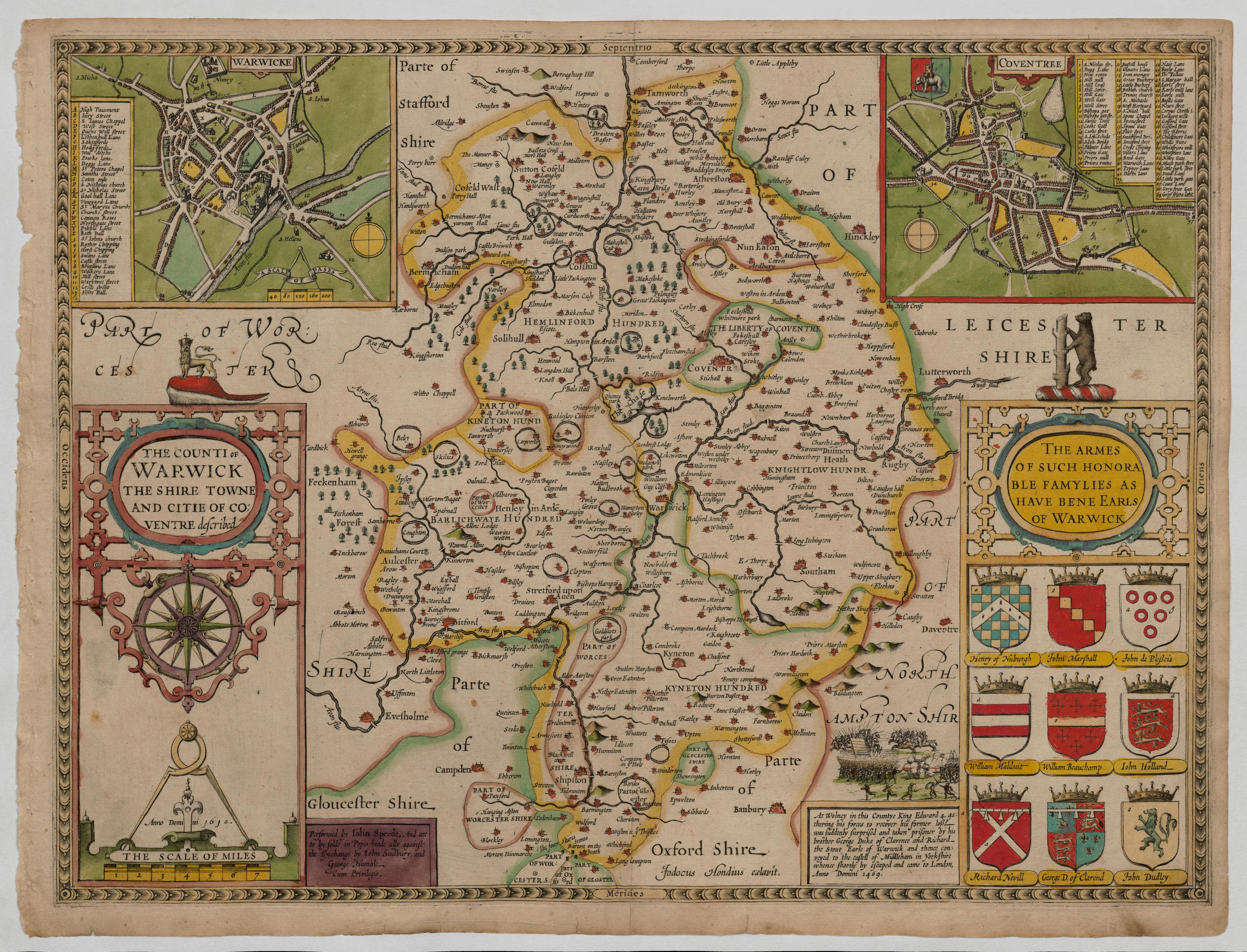
John Speed map of Warwickshire from 1610

When the Black Death reached Warwickshire in the mid-14th century, the people of Ansley abandoned the village and moved approximately a mile to the village’s current location. The parish church of St Laurence, however, remains in its original position. Traces of the original village can still be seen from the air, as can signs of medieval and post-medieval "ridge and furrow cultivation". By 1482, Ansley was owned by the Prior of St Mary’s, Coventry.

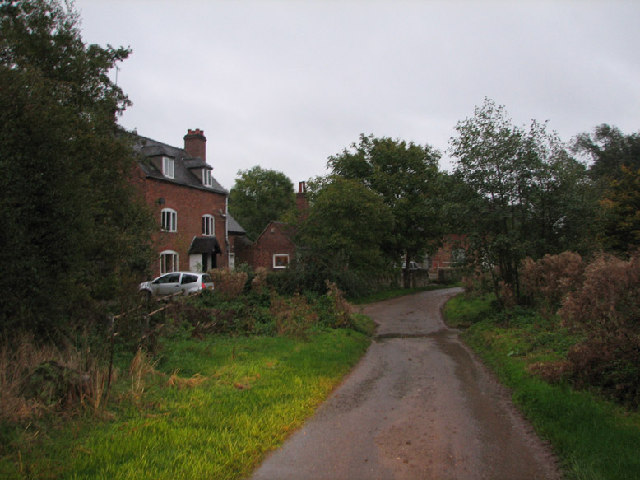
Ansley Mill and Ford

Bourne Brook, running north-east to south-west through the parish, has had an Irish bridge ford at Ansley Mill since the 12th century. The mill was sold by John Colepeper to Ralph Pickering and John Dyson in 1550. The building that currently stands was built in 1768. The last known miller was Isaac Thurn, in 1896. The mill has subsequently been converted into a private home.

Hoar Park, located on the B4114, was established in 1430. The current building dates from the 1730s. Hoar Park Wood was designated a Site of Special Scientific Interest (SSSI) in 1987. Other woodlands in the parish are Lady Wood, Seven Foot Wood and New Park Spinney.

== Ansley Hall ==
Ansley Hall and its estate was home to the Ludford family for the best part of 450 years, from 1410 when Sir Thomas Colepeper leased 50 acres of the land to Henry Ludford. Colepeper’s grandson increased this to 300 acres, but not the hall itself. This gave rise to the situation where the Ludfords claimed for rightful ownership, taking legal action against the Colepepers in 1535 and 1544, both times unsuccessfully.

In 1551, the Colepepers sold Ansley Hall and its estate. It passed through several hands, including George Wightman of Elmesthorpe, Leicester in 1558, who sold it to William Glover, a London dyer, in 1592. Sir Thomas Glover sold it in 1609 and it was purchased by George Ludford in 1613 (or possibly 1611).

From this time, the inhabitants of hall were as follows:

- George Ludford (1583-1627) m. Sarah Warren
  - John Ludford (1624-1675) m. Catherine Prescott
    - James Ludford (1655-1699)
      - Thomas Bracebridge Ludford (d.1700) although younger than his brother Samuel, Thomas initially inherits Ansley Hall from his uncle, James Ludford
      - Samuel Bracebridge Ludford (1680-1727) inherited Ansley Hall from his younger brother m. Catherine Lewis
        - John Bracebridge Ludford (1707-1775) m. Juliana Newdigate (1711-1780)
          - John Newdigate Ludford (1754-1825) m. Elizabeth Boswell (1756-1825)
            - Elizabeth Juliana Bracebridge Ludford (1779-1859) m. Sir John Francis Newdigate Ludford, 5th Baronet Chetwode (1788-1873) assumed the name Newdigate Ludford by Royal Licence, 1826, leased mineral rights for the land under Ansley Hall to the Ansley Hall Coal and Iron Company in 1872

Ansley Hall was described in The Beauties of England and Wales (1814) as "a large and rather confusing mansion, irregular but very respectable." It was part Elizabethan, part Georgian with gothic sash windows. Most of the building dated from 1720 to 1730. It had in its art collection "the celebrated drawing made by Beighton in 1716 from the curious fresco painting of Kenilworth Castle" from a wall at Newnham Paddox.

Nearby Bretts Hall, named for the Brett (or Bret) family, who lived there during the time of Henry III was pulled down in 1750 to create Ansley Park, which included a formal avenue, a Chinese temple and a hermitage (cell) which is attributed to Capability Brown (c.1715-1783) who built a similar hermitage at Weston Park.

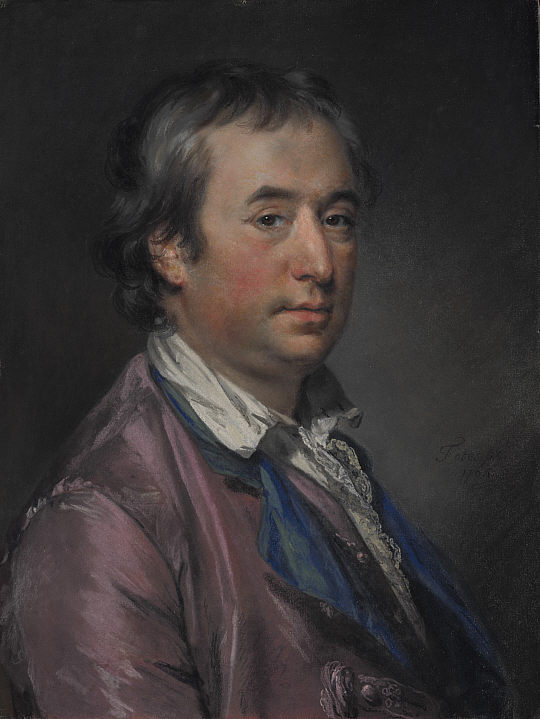
Sir William Chambers by Francis Cotes, 1764

The park’s Chinese temple was designed by Sir William Chambers (1723-1796), architect to George III and author of Designs of Chinese Buildings, Furniture, Dresses, Machines and Utensils (1757). Chambers had travelled to China in the 1740s and was regarded as an expert in his field, "unrivalled by others in his profession". He built Ansley Hall’s temple in 1767, and designed similar structures in Kew, Blackheath and Amesbury. Beneath the temple was a cell containing a monument relating to the Purefoy family, Parliamentarians who had had their estates confiscated because of their involvement in the death of Charles I.

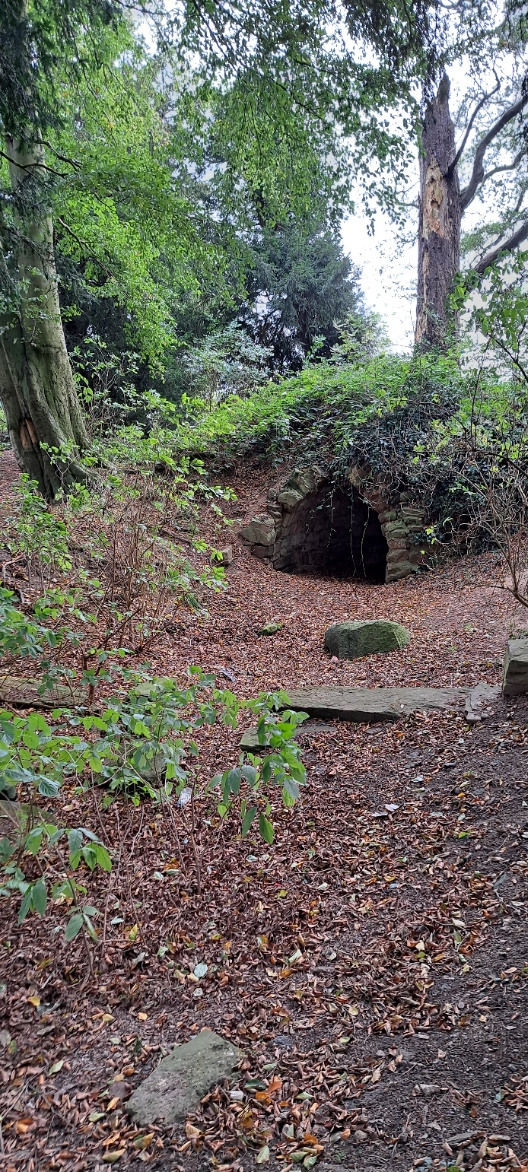
Ansley Hall Hermitage

In 1758 Ansley Hall was visited by the poet Thomas Warton, who would later become poet laureate. He wrote the poem An Inscription about Ansley’s hermitage which begins "Beneath the stony roof reclin’d / I sooth to peace my pensive mind. In 1814 the park was described as "well stocked with deer".

Ansley Hall and its land was leased to the Ansley Hall Coal and Iron Company by the Ludford family in 1872 after which the hall was used as a club and institute for colliery officials and estate tenants. After the UK coal industry was nationalised in 1947, the Hall became a social club for miners and their families. With the collapse of the mining industry, the hall was derelict by the 1960s. Between 1998 and 2001 it was developed into 16 private homes.

== Industry ==
Until coalmining came to Ansley in the 1870s, its principal industry was agricultural (barley, rye, pasture and meadow land), with some silk ribbon weaving and brick making. In the early 19th century John Newdigate Ludford of Ansley Hall had been a "noted cheese-maker", selling to the Leicester market. By the early 20th century the principal crops were wheat, oats, peas and beans. Coal was worked on a small scale.

=== Ansley Hall Colliery ===
The Ansley Hall Coal and Iron Company established the Ansley Hall Colliery in 1872. A pit was sunk between 1873 and 1874 with three shafts, one for ventilation. The mine was described as covering "approximately 3,000 acres and encompassed no less than eleven seams of coals, giving a total thickness of eighty feet and with six seams of a workable quality potentially providing over 100 million tons of gettable coal." The deepest point was 540 feet below ground. William Garside Phillips (1849-1929) became the managing director in 1879 and was "instrumental in improving the colliery’s productivity and economic fortunes".

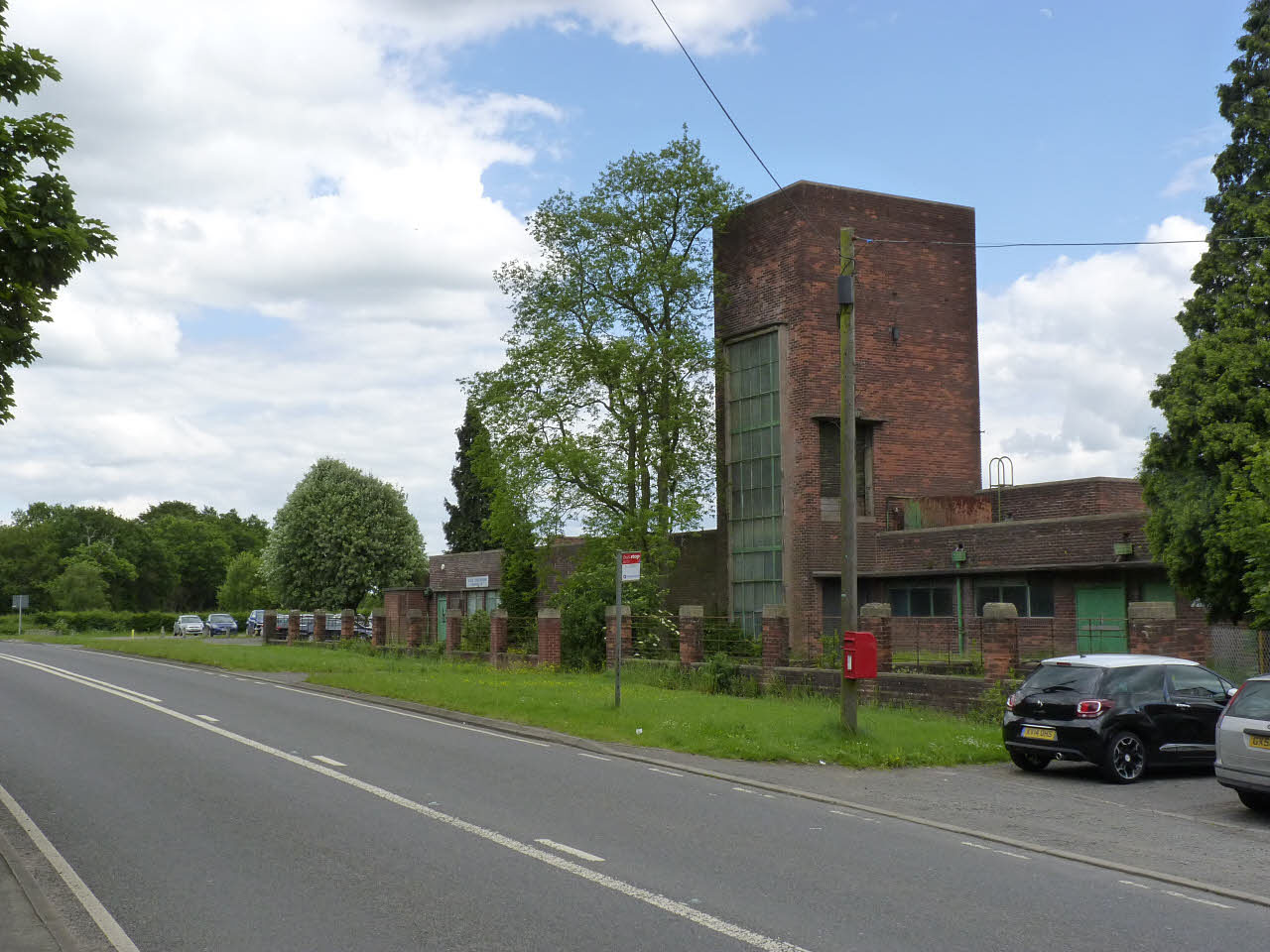
Former pithead baths at Ansley Hall Colliery

Ansley Hall Coal and Iron Company’s largest stakeholder was Sir James Barlow (1821-1887), a cotton magnate from Bolton, Lancashire. His son, Sir Thomas Barlow, 1st Baronet (1845-1945), was chairman of the company for some time (he was also the royal physician and known for his research into infantile scurvy). His son in turn, Sir James Alan Barlow, 2nd Baronet (1881-1964) was a director. The company bought the entire estate in 1899.

The colliery became significant enough to have its own railway line, and the Ansley Hall Colliery Branch Line opened in 1876. It remained in operation until 1959. In 1888, instead of relying on pit ponies for transporting coal and coal refuse the pit became fully electric, the first colliery in Warwickshire to adopt this "pioneer movement". In 1904 it could produce 1,200 tonnes of coal a day. At its peak, in 1940, it employed 670 people. The pit merged with Haunchwood colliery in 1959 which in turn closed in 1967.

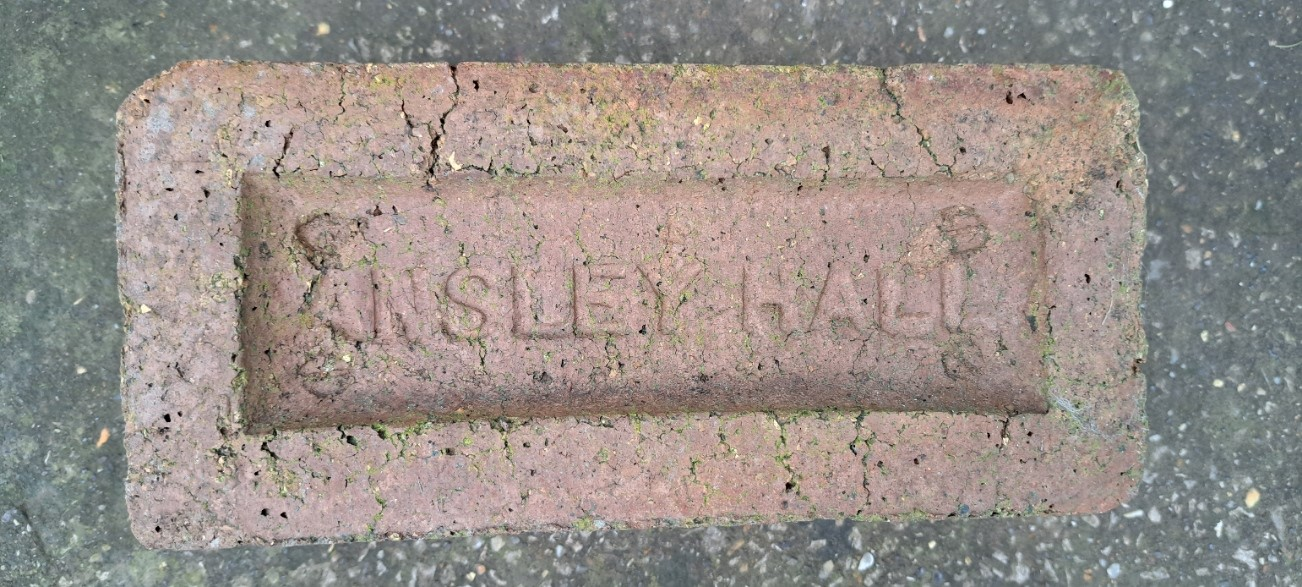
Ansley Hall brick

The company also owned a brickworks capable of producing 3 million hard red bricks per year. Some of the bricks were used in the north aisle of St Laurence Church. Production ceased in 1959.

== Water and electricity ==
Ansley was the last parish in Warwickshire to get a "more or less efficient supply of good water", and remained dependent on shallow wells until 1913. As late as 1927 there were still "no water closets in the village, and some of the sanitary arrangements were distinctly objectionable." In 1928 Ansley Parish Council cancelled the retaining fee they had been paying to the Nuneaton Fire Brigade, owing to "there being no public water supply, and very little other sources of supply in the Ansley village." In 1929 Atherstone’s Medical Officer of Health called Ansley "the one black spot of my district" in terms of water supply. He went on to say that "they would always have trouble at Ansley Village, as there was no water scheme. The water from the wells had been condemned."

An article published in 1929 read, "Ansley village is one of those places which is just on the edge of things, yet possesses little in the way of modern conveniences. It has neither electric or gas lighting, is without an adequate water supply and has no sewerage system. A resident [said] that owing to the lack of a sewerage system the district was infested with rats… and if a fire were to break out in a block of houses it would be impossible to get under control, there being no water to cope with it." In 1931, cast iron water mains were finally laid to the village. The following year a sewage scheme for Ansley Common and Chapel End was put in place.

The possibility of Ansley's being added to Nuneaton's electricity supply from the Leicestershire and Warwickshire Electric Power Company was first raised in 1923, when the supply to neighbouring Chapel End and Hartshill was imminent, Hartstill having "suffered for years from the quality of the gas, which had been rotten." In 1932, St Laurence Church was "fitted out and made ready for lighting by means of electricity" for which, in the words of the vicar, Rev. R P Rowan, "we have waited long and patiently." In 1934, despite "the large volume of traffic which use the road", there was still no street lighting in Ansley village, although later that year cabling to Ansley Road via Arbury Hall was laid.

== Places of worship ==
=== St Laurence Church ===
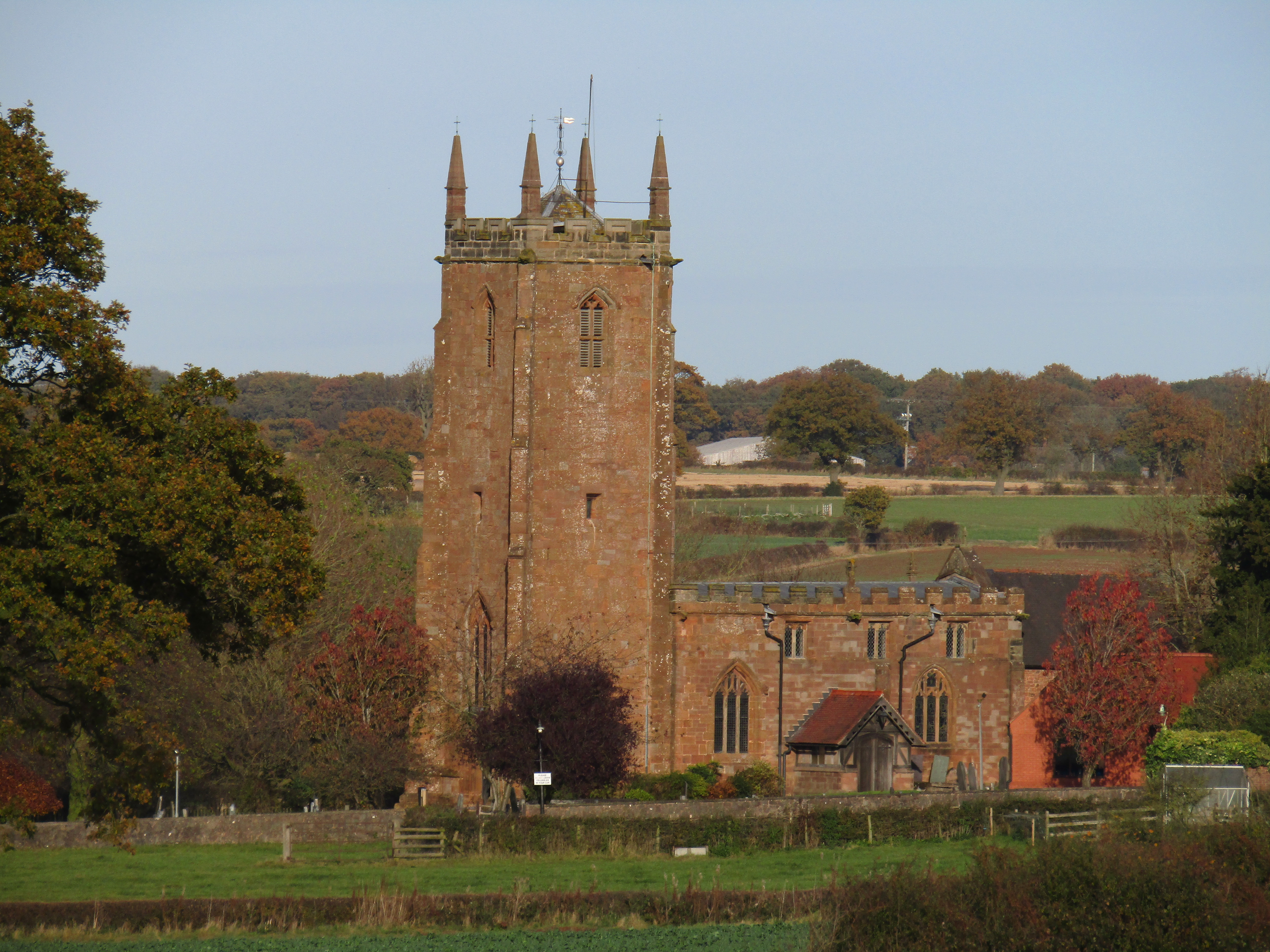
St Lawrence Church, Church End, Ansley

St. Laurence Church is located at Church End. It is a Grade II listed building with mid to late-12th century foundations. It is possible that it was originally built for Lady Godiva, as she had "several churches built in the area at this time that were dedicated to St Laurence, after Abbot Laurence, a trusted friend." Whether the name should be spelt Laurence or Lawrence has been a "bone of contention for many centuries". It is currently spelt with a ‘u’.

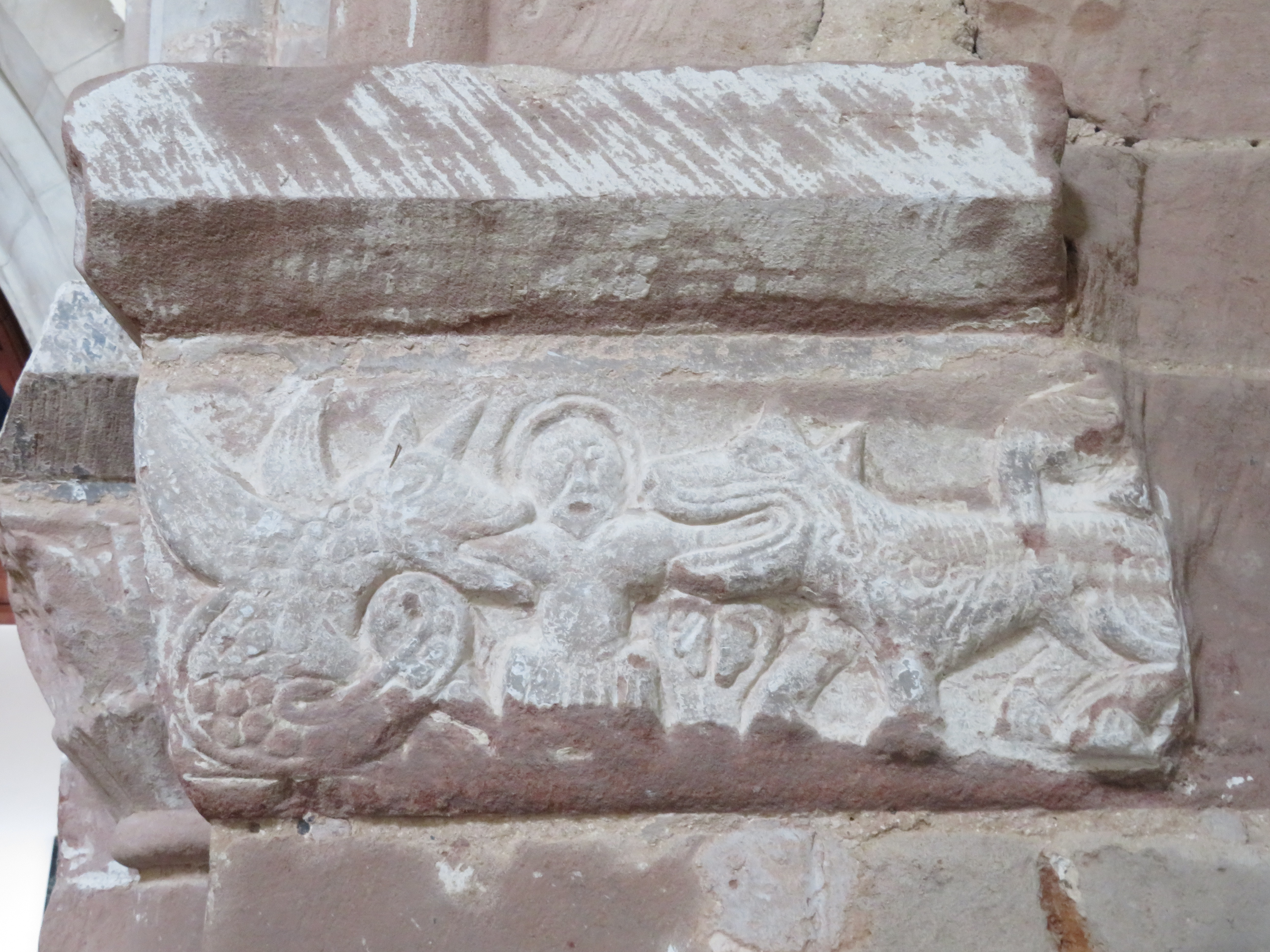
Two monsters striving for possession of a man

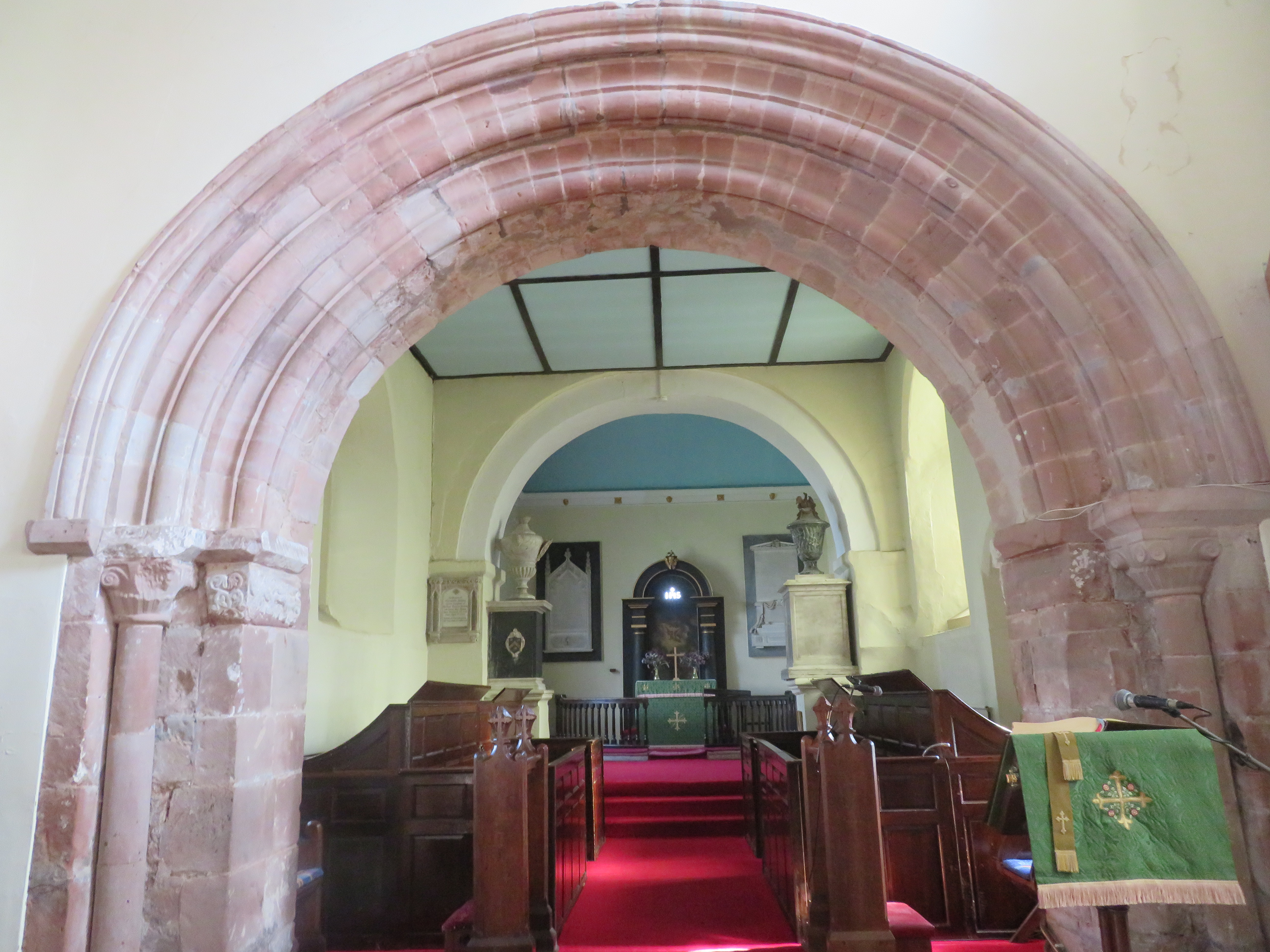
Norman arch

In 1206 William de Hardreshulle, Lord of Hartshill (d.1261) bestowed the church to the nuns of Polesworth Abbey. It stayed in the possession of the Abbey until the Dissolution of the monasteries in the mid 16th century. It then became the property of the crown. The church’s tower and clerestory were added in the late 15th century. The chancel was doubled in length in the 18th century. The porch was added the late 19th century and the north aisle in 1913. The church was restored in 1894 and 1902. A west gallery was removed in 1931. On one column there is a "grotesque carving of two monsters striving for possession of a man". There are the remains of Norman hinges on a door, dating from around 1150. In the churchyard is a Parish Room, an on-site function room, by Kenneth Holmes Associates (2003), and the octagonal base of a medieval cross.

The church’s financial situation has varied considerably through the centuries, but was particularly parlous in 1837, when the vicar of St Laurence, whose annual salary was £116 – far below the national average of £285 – appealed to the bishop to be ‘non-resident’ in Ansley, citing an "unfit residence". By 1884, the vicar’s annual income was £236, but had fallen again to £160 by 1904.

The church was submitted to the Society for the Protection of Ancient Buildings to be considered for inclusion in their list of historic buildings in 1898, 1908 and 1913. It received its Grade II* status in 1968.

Temporary girders were added to the church interior by the National Coal Board for the period between 1960 and 1968, to prevent subsidence from coal mining directly underneath.

In 1973, seven weeks before their wedding, and amid much secrecy, Mark Phillips and Princess Anne visited St Laurence Church to attend the funeral of Phillips’ grandmother, Mrs Dorothea Phillips. When the couple married, the parishioners of Ansley gave them "an inscribed telephone notepad".

St John’s Church in Ansley Common, built in 1927, is now twinned with St Laurence Church.

==== Bells and windows ====
There are six bells in the tower:
Bell 1: Made by Thomas Newcombe (c.1580) named ‘Margareta’ and is marked with their shield and a cross
Bell 2: Made by Robert, Thomas and William Newcombe (1609)
Bell 3: Made by George Oldfield (1669) stamped with Feare God Honour The King 1669
Bells 4-6: Three trebles made by John Taylor & Co (1976). These modern bells were funded by Ansley parishioners, from fund-raising barbeques held at Red House Farm and by Frederick and Daisy Cartwright in memory of the Cartwright family of Ansley.

In the early 20th century, St Laurence took part in the Warwickshire tradition of bell ringing on Bonfire Night, Restoration Day (29 May) and the Sovereign’s birthday.

The north window in the chancel contains fragments of 15th century glass from Coventry. There are also windows by Jones and Willis (1872), Clayton and Bell (1897), two by William Morris & Co (1921 and 1928) and a Woolliscroft Commemorative Window (2015) by Claire Williamson. In 1931 a window designed by Karl Parsons, Christ in Majesty, together with a new screen, choir stalls and electric lights, were dedicated to the memory of William Garside Phillips, who had been the managing director of Ansley Hall Colliery since 1879, and his wife.

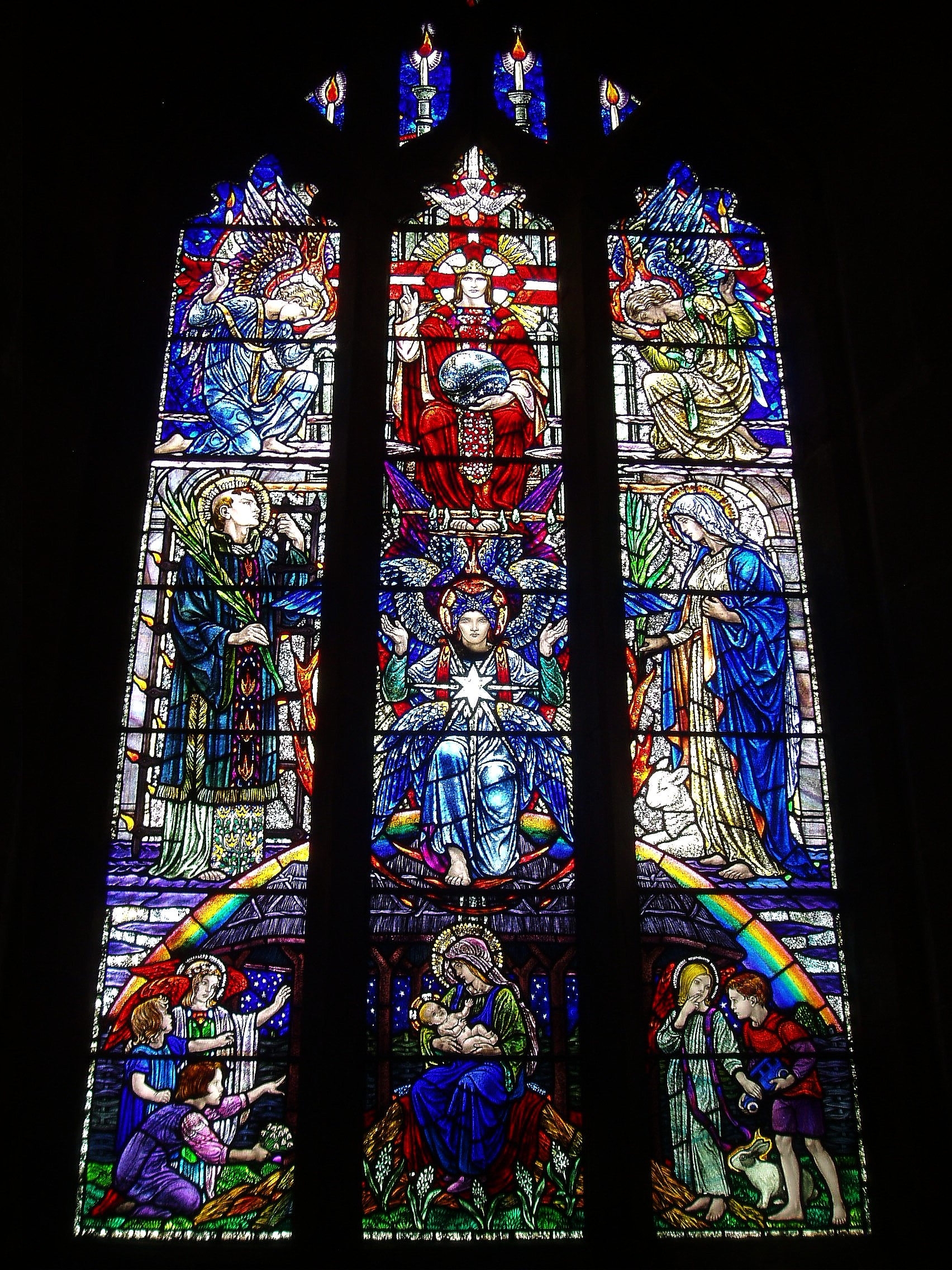
Karl Parsons, 1931

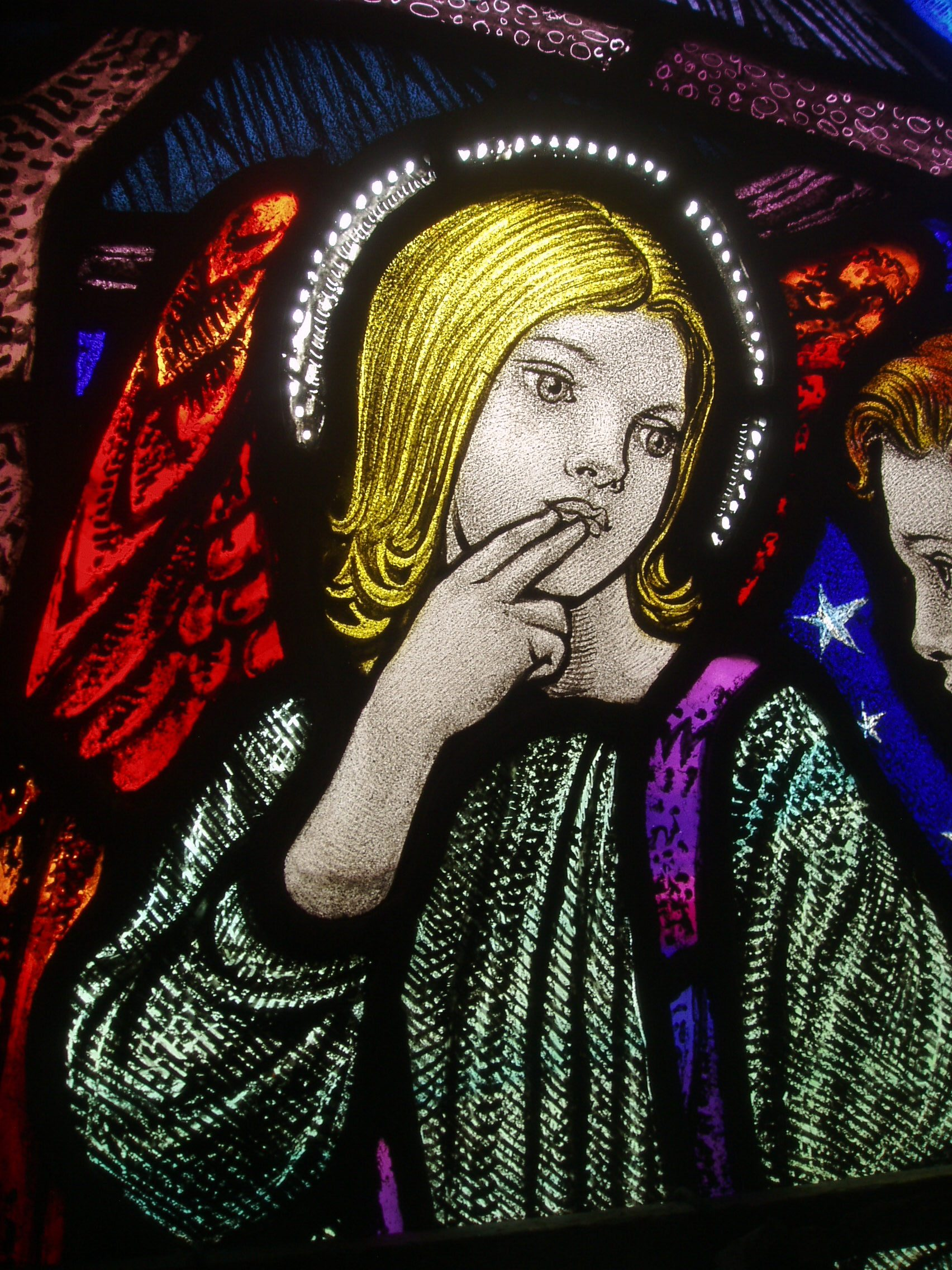
Detail, Parsons window

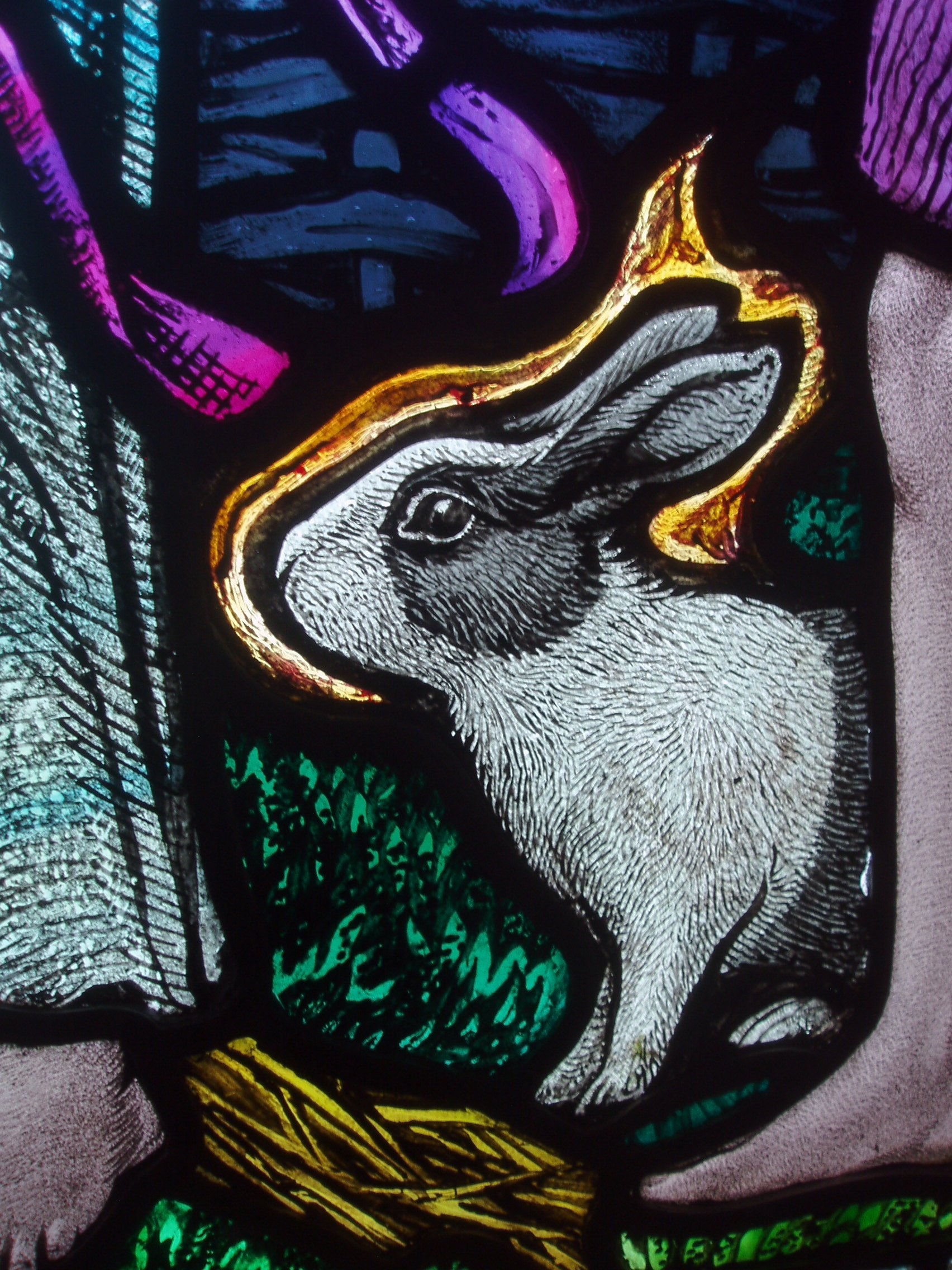
Detail, Parsons window

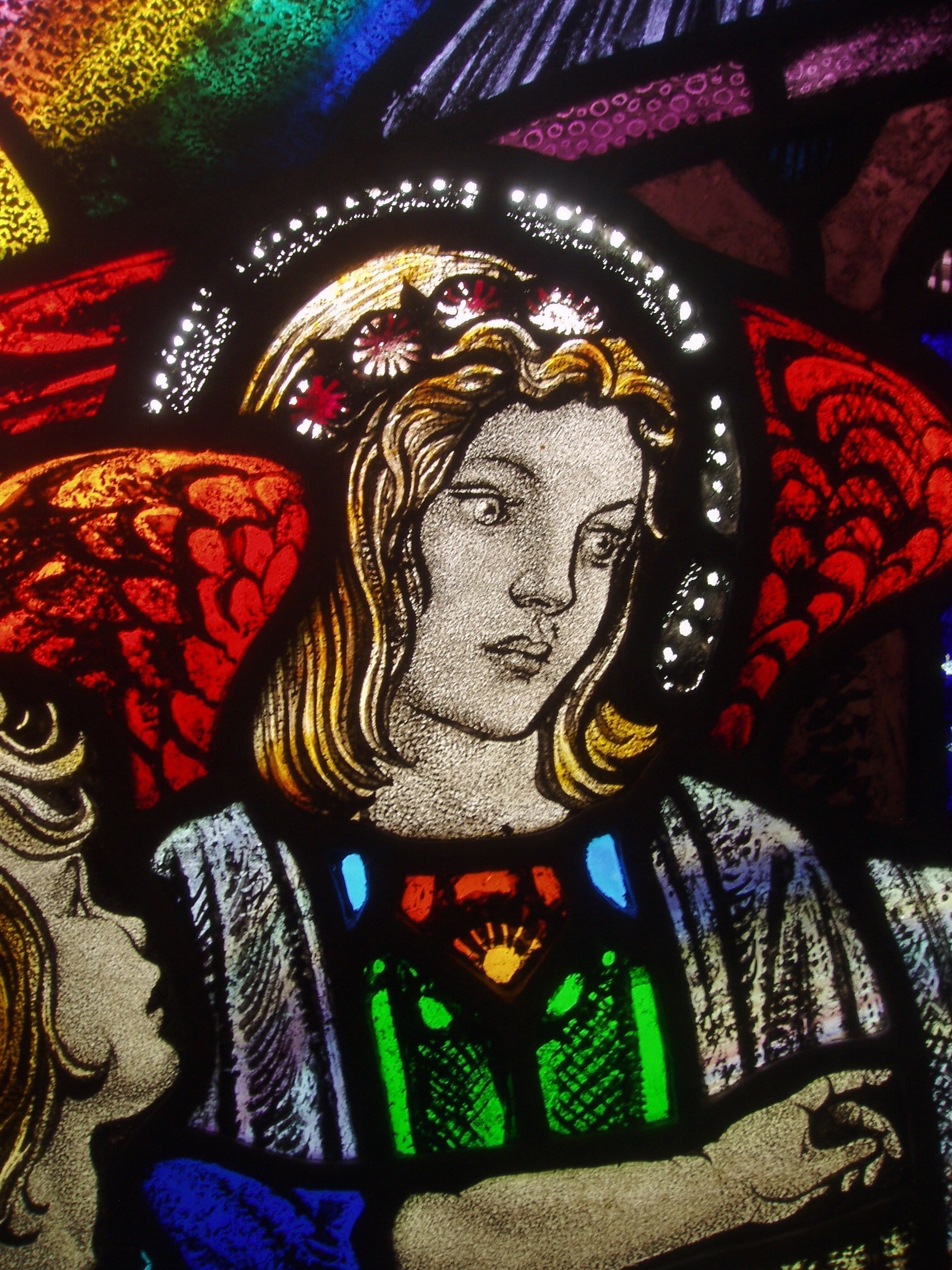
Detail, Parsons window

=== Other places of worship ===
Over the years, Ansley has had the following additional places of worship, all now closed:

- Ansley Congregational Chapel on Birmingham Road was established 1822. A new chapel was built in 1904
- Providence Independent Chapel, a small chapel, was built in 1823
- In early 1826 the Church of Christ began holding open air services in Ansley, with up to 1,200 people in regular attendance. These large turnouts led to money being collected to build a permanent place of worship, with contributions received from "many pious persons in London and in the country". Land was purchased and a chapel was erected to accommodate about 300 people where a first service was held on 14 July 1826, with however only twelve members. Ansley appeared in the church’s Evangelical Magazine and Missionary Chronicle in June 1827, where its population was described as "remarkable for ignorance and profaneness" and "remarkable for its moral darkness, and desperate wickedness". It was reported that "very few persons belonging to the village attended" the chapel "and from that time to the present [June 1827] the enemies of truth have exerted all their energies to prevent the success of the Gospel at Ansley."
- Wesleyan Chapel, Ridge Lane, a new chapel was built on the site of a former chapel in 1931
- Birchley Heath Primitive Methodist Meeting Place was founded in 1826 with capacity for 60 people.
- Ansley United Reformed Church was in operation by 1881
- Mission Church of St John, Ansley Common, in operation by 1912

== WWI and WWII ==
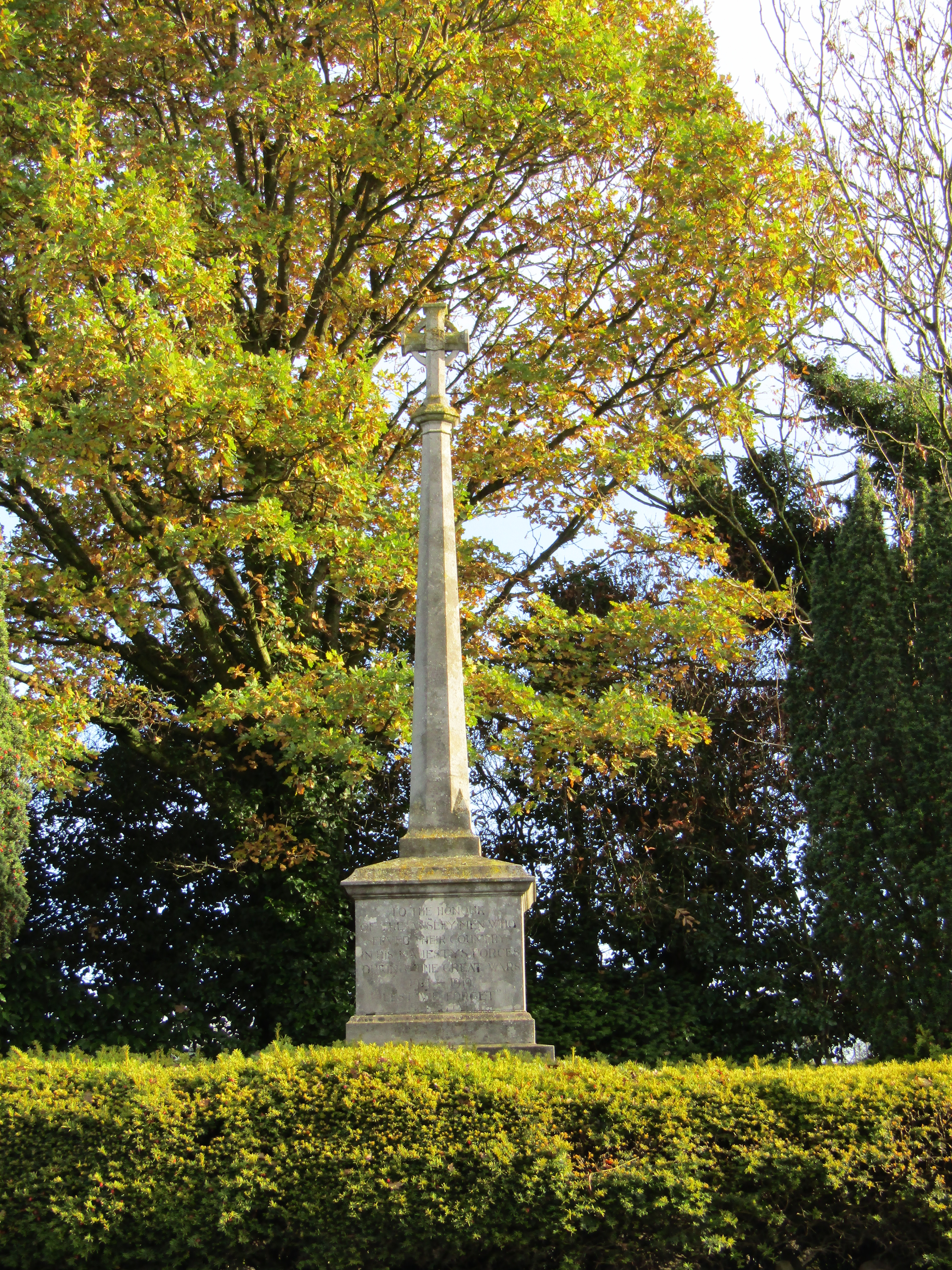
Ansley War Memorial (1920)

The Ansley Village Soldiers’ Relief Fund was created during WWI. The parish’s Grade II listed war memorial, a Latin cross built of Portland stone and Hollington sandstone, stands on the corner of Birmingham Road and Nuneaton Road. A plaque reads "To the honour of the Ansley men who served their country in his Majesty’s forces during the Great Wars" and lists the names of the 32 men of Ansley who died in WWI and nine in WWII.

The land for the memorial was given to the parish by the Ansley Hall Coal and Iron Company on 21 August 1920 and the memorial was dedicated by Dr Charles Lisle Carr (1871-1942), Bishop of Coventry, on 21 August 1921. The memorial originally featured two artillery guns, but these were removed in 1939 to be melted down for the war effort. The concrete bases on which the guns stood remain. A grant of £1,300 from English Heritage and the Wolfson Foundation in 2008 was used to clean, repair and repoint the joints of the Hollington sandstone.

In 1940, women from Ansley made 1,263 articles for the Warwickshire War Supply Services scheme, which were distributed to, amongst others, the British Expeditionary Force (BEF) in France and to Ansley’s Air Raid Precaution Point No. 8. In 1941, Ansley Women’s Voluntary Services (WVS), overseen by Mrs J H Phillips, the wife of Ansley Hall Colliery’s managing director, contributed 1,344 articles to the war effort, including 50 theatre gowns,180 pairs of pyjamas and 650 bandages, putting them first in the North Warwickshire WVS collection drive. There was also a Soldiers’ Comforts and Parcels Fund based at the Boot Inn, meaning "every soldier, sailor or airman in the village received several gifts from the fund."

In April 1945 the Ansley Common Forces Fund was established, to "provide comforts for members of His Majesty’s forces who have gone from Ansley Common." The administrative centre, for when the men were demobilised, was situated at 173 Ansley Common. In 1947 the fund paid for an oak reredos to be installed at the Mission Church of St John, dedicated to two local men who died in WWII.

== Buildings and facilities in Ansley ==
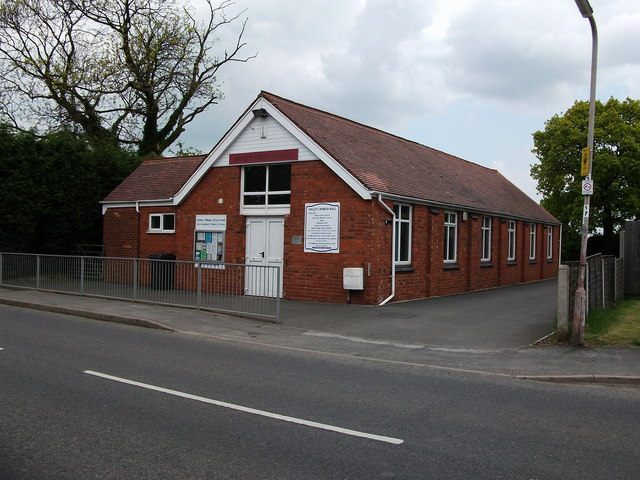
Ansley Village Hall, opened 1914

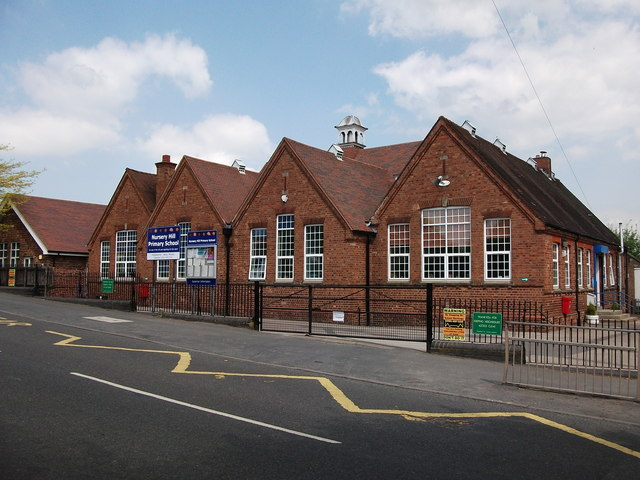
Ansley County School. The land was donated by W G Phillips. It opened 1906. Renamed Nursery Hill First School in 1973

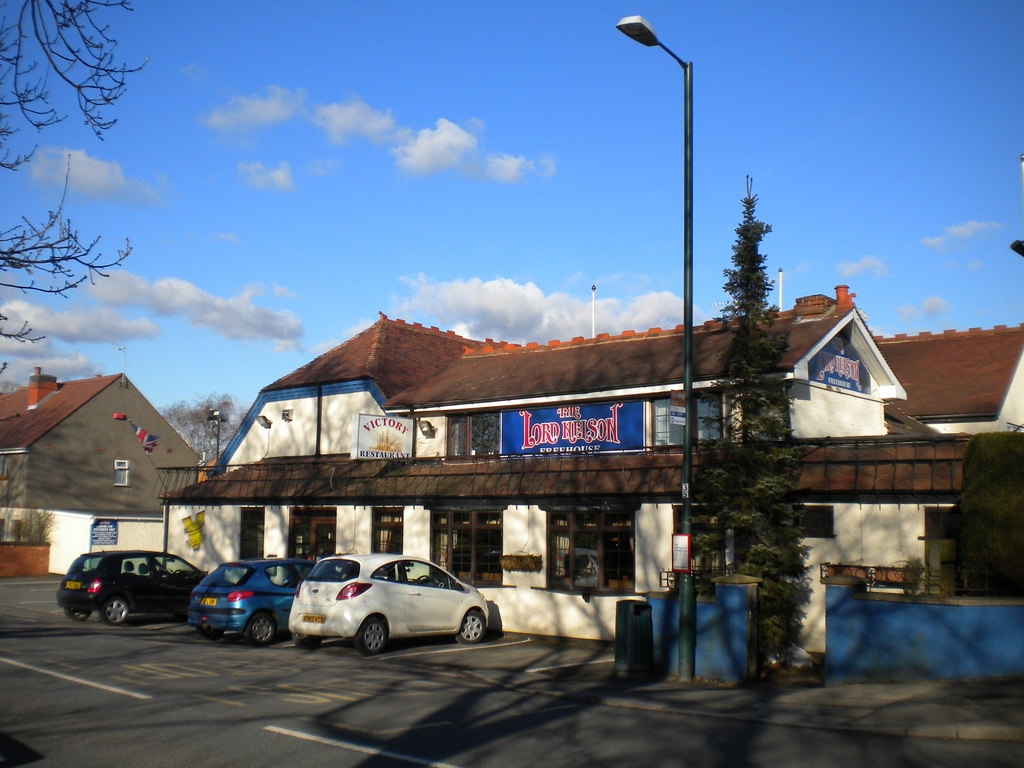
The Lord Nelson Inn, where, in the late 19th century, a lodge of the Grand United Order of Odd Fellows would meet. It contains two microbreweries.

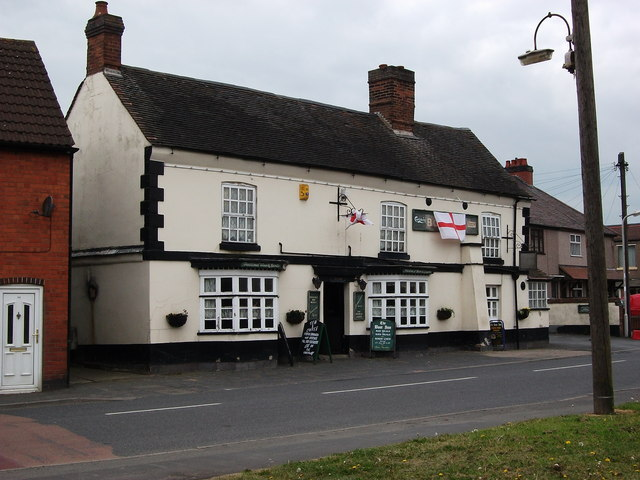
The Boot Inn. Open earlier than 1835. In the late 19th century, the Friendly Sick Society would hold its meetings. Of the group it was "said to be the best club within many miles of this place" (now closed)

== Clubs and societies ==
Ansley has played host to many clubs and societies since the 19th century:

=== Active clubs ===
- Ansley Allotment Society – established 1844 after being "stimulated by the advantages enjoyed by the inhabitants of surrounding villages". A nearby farm was offered to the Society "on easy terms" and the money from a sick club was used for the purchase. Now called Croft Mead Allotments.
- Ansley Cricket Club Ansley Common – in operation since before 1892
- Oakridge Golf Course – opened 1992
- Haunchwood Sports Football Club
- Ansley Common Residents’ Association (ACRA) established 2013

=== Historic clubs ===
The following clubs and societies are no longer in operation:

- Ansley Benefit Society: Active in 1862 (closed in 1899)
- Ansley Victoria Cricket Club: Active in 1895
- Ansley Football Club "The Lord Nelson Conquerors": Established in 1896
- Ansley Agricultural and Horticultural Society: Active in 1900
- Ansley Tennis Club: Active in 1912
- Ansley Boy Scouts: Established 1914, a new HQ was built in 1933

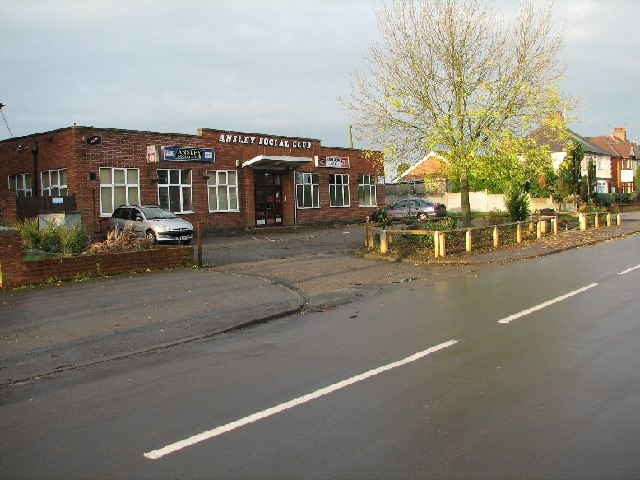
Ansley Social Club (closed)

- Ansley Social Club and Institute: Active in 1921. At its peak, it had 11,000 members. In 1926, "a pioneer class under a scheme arranged by the University Joint Committee of Birmingham and the W.M.C. and Institute Union" was run at the club, the subject being 19th century industrial history. (closed in 2015, with the land used for housing)
- Ansley Hall Colliery Football Club: Active in 1919
- Ansley Co-Operative Society: Active in 1926
- Ansley Girl Guides: Active in 1927
- Ansley Mothers’ Union: Active in 1928
- Ansley Royal Antediluvian Order of Buffaloes (RAOB): Active in 1928
- Ansley Social Club Orchestra: Active in 1931
- Ansley Women’s Institute: Opened in 1933
- Ansley and District Nursing Association: Active in 1933
- Ansley Sports Club: Active in 1934
- Ansley Adult School (part of the National Adult School Union): Active in 1935
- Ansley Bowling Club: Active in 1937
- Ansley Hall Scouts: Active in 1939
- Ansley Women’s Voluntary Services (WVS): Active in 1941
- Ansley Young Farmers’ Club: Active in 1942
- Ansley Progressive Association: Active in 1943
- Ansley Common Football Club: Active in 1995

== People connected with Ansley ==
- Anonymous (late 13th century) – a Franciscan friar born in Ansley. He compiled the Liber Exemplorum, a collection of "plausible stories, used to seize the attention of a preacher’s audience and illustrate a moral or theological point"
- In the mid 15th century, the vicar of Ansley granted parish land to Sir Thomas Malory (c.1393-c.1470), the author of Le Morte d’Arthur together with seven other people
- Henry Sewall (1544-1628) – merchant and politician who sat in the House of Commons from 1621 to 1622, owned land in Ansley
- Robert Clements (b.1595, Cosby, Leicestershire, d 1685, Haverhill, Massachusetts) – founding settler of Haverhill, Massachusetts lived in Ansley before sailing to New England, USA
- Isabella Farmer (d.1686, Massachusetts) – an early settler of Billerica, Massachusetts and the second wife of Thomas Wiswall, was born in Ansley
- Nathaniel Ireson (1685-1769) – master builder, was probably born in Ansley
- William Chambers (1723-1796) – Swedish-Scottish architect, commissioned to design a Chinese temple at Ansley Hall in 1767
- Thomas Warton (1723-1790) – English historian and poet, visited Ansley in 1758 and wrote the poem "An Inscription" about visiting the hermitage at Ansley Hall, published in 1777
- William Hutchins (1792-1841) – churchman and academic was born in Ansley. He sailed to Tasmania in 1836 and was the first Archdeacon of Van Diemen’s Land
- George Eliot (1819-1880) – novelist, poet, journalist and translator, was born in neighbouring Arbury and may have set Middlemarch and The Mill on the Floss around Ansley
- William Garside Phillips, JP (1849-1929) – Chairman of Warwickshire Coal Owners’ Association for 20 years, Chairman of Atherstone Rural District Committee for 21 years, managing director of Ansley Hall Colliery lived in Ansley for 50 years
- Joseph Phillips (1881-1951) – first-class cricketer, was born at Ansley Hall. He played for Ansley Hall Cricket Club. He was grandfather to Captain Mark Phillips
- Harry Smith (1886-1955) – manager at Ansley Hall Colliery
- Charlie Dixon (1903-1993) – English footballer, born in Ansley
- John Eric Maidens – inventor of a knitting machine pattern device, lived in Ansley
- Ethel Elizabeth Angell, FRSA – oil painter who exhibited at the Royal Academy in the 1930s and 1940s was from Ansley Common
- Henry Plumb, Baron Plumb (1925-2022) – politician, born at Park Farm, Ansley. He attended Ansley C of E Primary School and was a member of Ansley Young Farmers’ Club
- Johnny Schofield (1931-2006) – played football for Ansley Hall Colliery
- Maureen Stephenson (1927-2008) – author, lived at Ansley Mill from the 1980s
- Naomi Smith (1980-1995) – schoolgirl, murdered at Ansley Common in 1995

== Recent developments ==
In recent history Ansley has been the recipient of several community grants:

=== Community Fund ===
Ansley has successfully applied for the following grants from the National Lottery Community Fund:

- 2005 - Ansley Sports Cricket Club was awarded £5,000 for pitch covers
- 2007 - Ansley village and Birchley Heath were awarded £10,000 from the to install new playground equipment
- 2007 - Ansley Sports Cricket Club was awarded £3,240 for essential equipment
- 2008 - Ansley Allotment Society was awarded £6,873 to create composting toilets with disabled facilities
- 2009 - Birchley Heath was awarded £8,986 to improve playground equipment
- 2012 - Ansley Parish Council was awarded £10,000 for a Community Hardstanding and Meeting Place project

=== Heritage Lottery Fund ===
In 2008, Ansley became part of the North Arden Heritage Trail, a circular walk around North Warwickshire, funded by the Heritage Lottery Fund. The 25-mile trail passes through Atherstone, Mancetter, Hartshill, Ansley, Arley, Fillongley, Maxstoke, Shustoke, Nether Whitacre, Kingsbury, Dordon, Baddesley Ensor and Merevale.

=== Big Local ===
In 2012, Ansley village, together with Old Arley and New Arley was a recipient of £1,000,000 of Big Local funding, a National Lottery Community Fund-funded programme, which invested in 150 areas across England. Initially calling themselves "Leys Millionaires" they changed to "Ansley and Arley Big Local".

=== Ansley Common Recreation Ground ===
In 2021, Ansley Common, together with three other play areas, were granted £200,000 by the county council to improve play facilities, including building a BMX or pump track.

== Culture ==
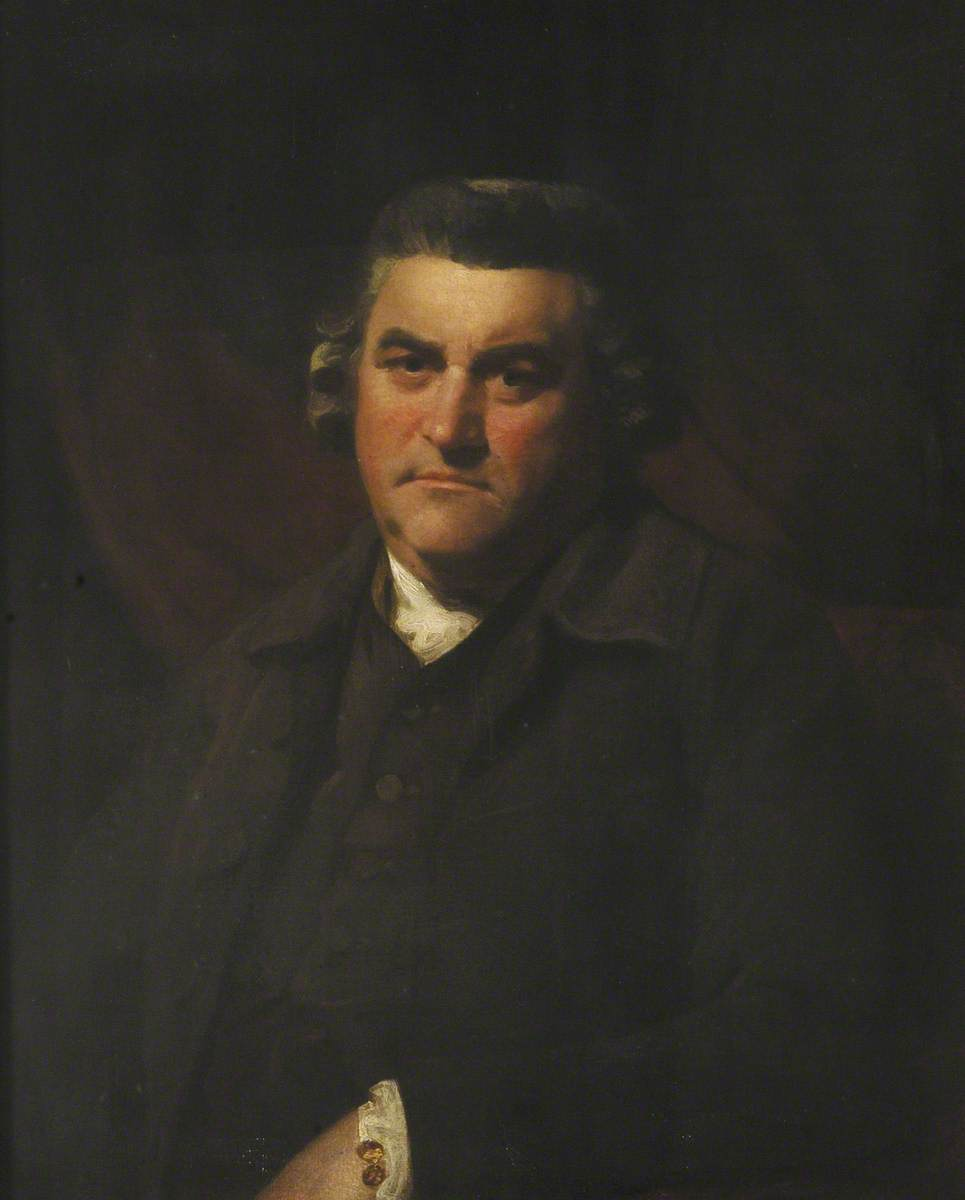
Thomas Warton by Joshua Reynolds

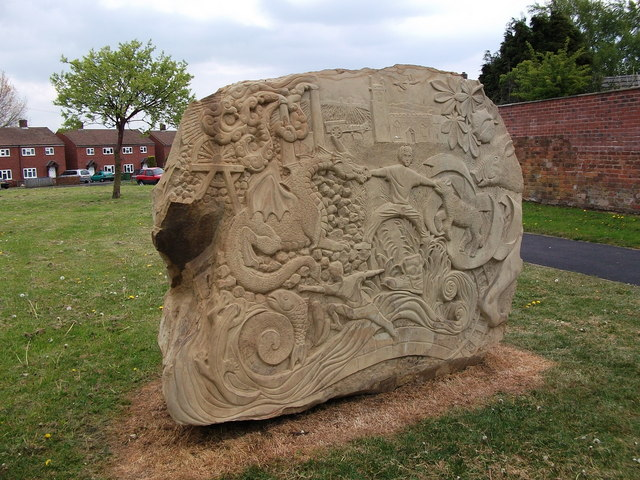
Tom sandstone sculpture by Graeme Mitcheson

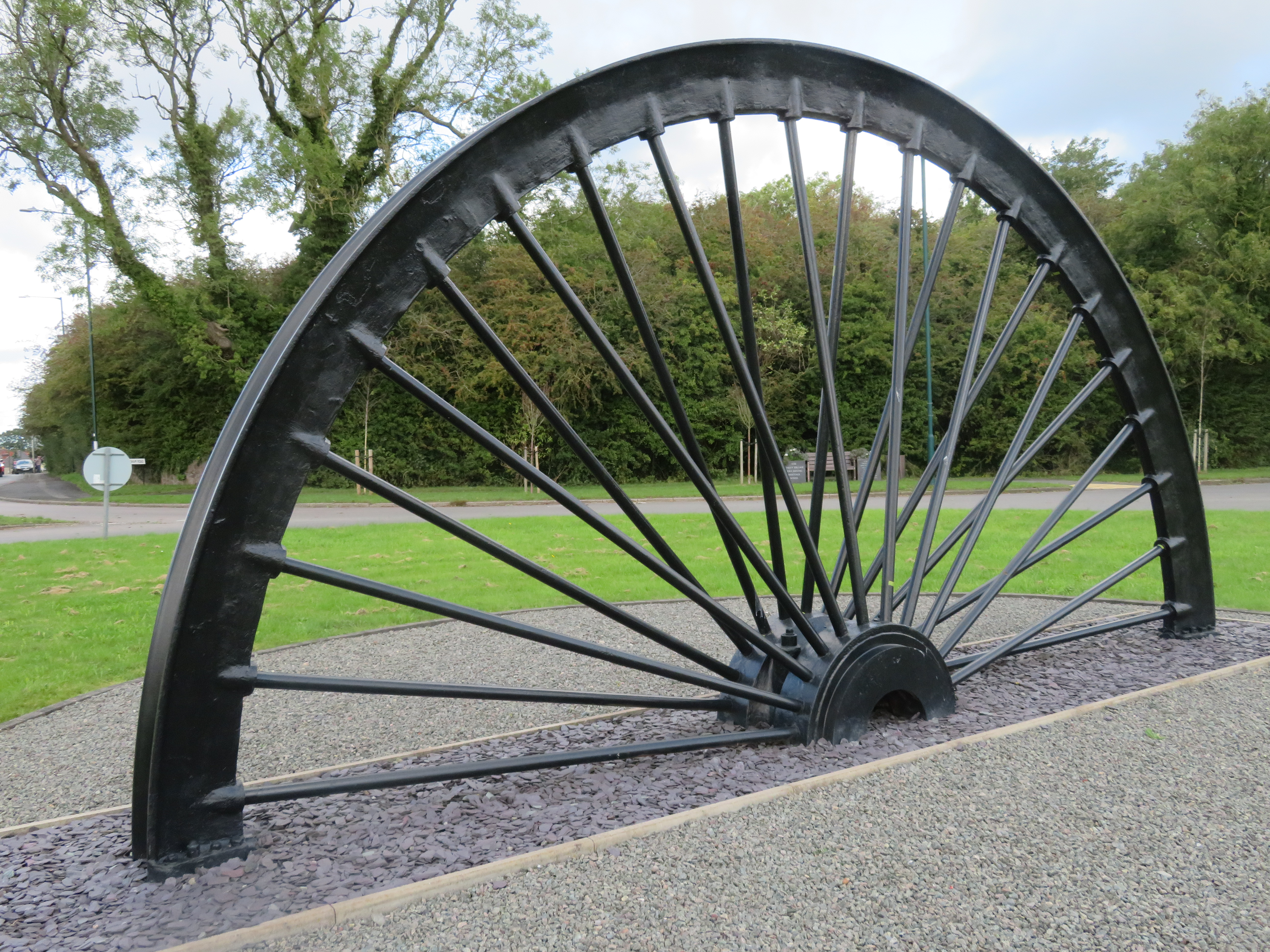
Ansley Village Coal Mining Heritage Wheel

- The poet Thomas Warton wrote the poem An Inscription in a Hermitage after visiting Ansley Hall’s hermitage in 1758. Part of the poem appeared in chapter XVII of Walter Scott’s 1820 novel Ivanhoe.
- The Ludford Box is a collection of eleven children’s books spanning 1746-1781, once owned by John Newdigate Ludford of Ansley Hall and then his daughter, Elizabeth Juliana Ludford. These books were the subject of a 1989 study by Brian Alderson, discussing "their contribution to our knowledge of eighteenth-century children’s literature" and are kept at University of California, Los Angeles’ Department of Special Collections
- Ansley appeared in John Byng, 5th Viscount Torrington’s 1793 Torrington Diary – A Tour of North Wales, where he described it as "a pleasant village with a neat public house".
- The Ansley Morris, a woman’s Cotswold Morris side, was founded in 2007
- A sandstone sculpture, called Tom by Graeme Mitcheson was installed on the village green in 2009. It forms part of the North Arden Heritage Trail and depicts Ansley’s heritage and natural environment, including mining, ribbons, conkers, brooks and great crested newts
- Ansley is referenced in Rosie Goodwin’s novels Yesterday’s Shadows (2009) Pub. Magna, A Mother’s Shame (2014) Pub. Canvas, The Soldier’s Daughter (2014) Pub. Canvas, The Little Angel (2017) Pub. Zaffre, A Simple Wish (2021) pub. Bonnier and A Lesson Learned (2023) Pub. Bonnier.
- Ansley is mentioned in Kathleen Fleming’s autobiography Thirty-five Acres, a Spade, and a fork (2013) Pub. Xlibris
- The Ansley Village Coal Mining Heritage Wheel was opened on Ansley Island, the roundabout outside the village, in February 2017. It features half of the original shaft winding wheel from Daw Mill colliery, the last working colliery in Warwickshire, which closed in 2013. A plaque reads "A tribute to the many miners who worked in our local coal mines. They worked underground in darkness so that we might be in warmth and light." The other half of the wheel is at New Arley Primary School, New Arley
