= Walter Rossiter =

English painter

Walter Rossiter PS (16 February 1871 - 1948) was an English landscape and garden painter mainly in pastel and watercolour although he also produced some fine examples in oil.

Born in Bath, Walter studied in Paris and Rouen and took part in exhibitions at the Walker Gallery in Liverpool, the Royal Institute of Painters in Water Colours The Pastel Society, the Paris Salon and in 1913 the Royal Academy.

His father Thomas, professional gardener, might have been influential in his devotion to paint gardens but Walter also lived for a time in Kent, where he probably came in touch with the work of George Samuel Elgood and Ernest Arthur Rowe, both garden painters living in Kent.

In 1918 after the Exhibition at the Pastel Society, Rossiter received a mention by the critic Ezra Pound on The New Age Magazine. Walter Rossiter was a member of the Pastel society and Founder of the Coventry and Warwickshire Society of Artists.
