= Murder of Naomi Smith =

1995 child murder in England

Naomi Louise Smith
- Smith c. 1995
- Born: 4 March 1980; Coventry, England
- Died: 14 September 1995 (aged 15); Nuneaton, Warwickshire, England
- Cause of death: Haemorrhage due to severance of the carotid vessels
- Resting place: Chapel End Methodist Church Cemetery, Nuneaton, Warwickshire; 52.536°N 1.510°W (approximate)
- Occupation: Student
- Known for: Victim of child murder
- Parent(s): Brian Smith (father); Catherine Smith (mother)

Naomi Louise Smith (4 March 1980 – 14 September 1995) was a 15-year-old schoolgirl from Nuneaton. On the evening of 14 September 1995, Smith left her home to post a letter for her mother at a local post box. When she failed to return, her father Brian Smith and her best friend Emma Jones went out to look for her. Just before midnight, they discovered her body lying beneath the children's slide of a local playground just a few hundred metres from her home. Smith had been sexually assaulted, her throat had been cut, and her genitals mutilated with a knife. She attended Hartshill School.

Edwin Hopkins, 19, was found guilty of the murder in January 1997 and sentenced to life imprisonment with a minimum term of 18 years.

== Background ==
Naomi Louise Smith was born in Coventry, the daughter of Brian and Catherine Smith. She lived in Bretts Hall Estate, in Nuneaton, Warwickshire and attended Hartshill School. Her parents described her as a normal teenage girl who was quite shy and lacked confidence. She was described locally as a quiet girl who liked music and gymnastics.

During the day of 14 September 1995, Smith had been with her best friend Emma Jones at the rehearsals of a local marching band in which Emma played the xylophone. After the rehearsals Smith had been dropped off outside her home and was seen to walk inside.

Smith left her home at approximately 9.45pm during the same evening to post a letter to a catalogue company for her mother Catherine. The post box was located about 200 yards from her home on the main road through the Ansley Common area. She was wearing jeans, a dark blue polo neck jumper with an old white Aran-style jumper. She was also wearing a bomber-style jacket with the words Chicago Fire Department on the front and BACKDRAFT written on the back.

At around 11.15pm when she failed to return home, Smith's father, Brian Smith, who worked as a local taxi driver went out in his car to look for her. Mr Smith drove to the house of Smith's best friend, Emma Jones, to see if she was there, but when she was not found Emma joined the search. Shortly before midnight as they drove into the car park of the local recreation ground, Smith's body was discovered underneath the children's slide of the playground. A post mortem examination carried out later revealed that she had been sexually assaulted, her throat had been cut and her body had been mutilated.

== Initial investigation ==
The investigation was headed by Detective Superintendent Tony Bayliss of the Warwickshire Police Force. An incident room was set up at Bedworth Police Station.

Throughout Friday 15 September, Police search teams of approximately 30 officers scoured the area around the recreation ground to search for clues. The initial search was hampered by poor weather and continued over the next few days. Despite a thorough search of the area, Police were unable to find a knife or weapon that might have been used in the murder.

Up to 50 officers were assigned to the case to take witness statements and carry out door to door enquiries. During the course of the investigation, Bayliss made several appeals directly to the public through news media allowing news cameras access to the incident room and to follow teams of detectives during the investigation.

On Saturday 16 September, Police held a press conference to appeal for information. Three or four youths had been seen in the area opposite the Smith's home between 10pm – 11pm on the evening that Smith was murdered. Police appealed for the youths to come forward and the appeals were accompanied by offers of a reward of £10,000 for any information that might lead to a conviction. At the same time, Smith's parents, Brian and Catherine Smith, her half-brother David Smith and her best friend Emma Jones made personal appeals for information and for witnesses to come forward.

On 17 September, with her parents permission, the Police took the unusual step of detailing Smith's injuries. The information was a direct appeal to someone who might have been trying to shield the murderer.

Detective Superintendent Tony Bayliss said:

"I believe that it is right and proper to reveal the extent of Naomi's injuries, so that those who may have mixed loyalties about whether to come forward with information do so."

Smith's lower body had been mutilated and the killer had left a bite mark on her left breast. Saliva was found which might prove crucial to building a DNA profile. During a press conference held on Monday 18 September, Det. Supt. Tony Bayliss disclosed that scientists were attempting to build a DNA profile of the killer and did not rule out mass DNA screening if it were necessary to identify a suspect.

== Witnesses ==
Early in the investigation, police focused on witness statements from people who had been in the area at the time Smith went missing. One witness, a motorist, reported seeing Smith standing close to the post box as if she were waiting for someone.

A young girl who lived on the road opposite the post box stated that she had seen Smith post the letter and then continue walking past the post box for a short distance. After walking for a few steps, she paused and then turned back toward the direction of the post box. After passing the post box, the young witness said that she saw Smith pause at the entrance to an alleyway, known locally as "the jitty", before walking down the alleyway and out of sight. This footpath led behind the houses of Bretts Hall Estate towards the recreation ground where she was later discovered. Friends said that it was possible for her to reach her home that way, but it was unlikely that she would have chosen to go that way after dark.

A cyclist who had been cycling along the main road reported seeing a man running out from the jitty. The man was described as being aged twenty to twenty five, of athletic build and with short blond hair that looked bleached and spiky on top.

== Arrests and raids ==
Early on the morning of 21 September 1995, five local men were arrested on suspicion of murder in co-ordinated early morning raids. The men were taken to Nuneaton police station for questioning. Two of the men were later released on bail, with 36-hour extensions sought to continue questioning the three remaining men. All of the men were later released without charge.

More than 20 addresses were raided by police with evidence taken to be sent for laboratory testing.

== Mass DNA screening ==
A month after the murder in October 1995, Detective Superintendent Tony Bayliss announced that a DNA profile of the killer had been obtained. In conjunction with forensic psychologist Paul Britton, an offender profile of around 800 local men, aged between 15 and 28 had been produced for DNA mass screening. The police forensic crime scene investigation was led by the Crime Scene Manager, Senior SOCO Paul Taberner, who was responsible for obtaining the DNA sample from Naomi's body.

Although it was not the first time DNA evidence had been used to solve a murder (that was in nearby Leicestershire with the conviction of Colin Pitchfork nearly a decade earlier), it was the first time that the Forensic Science Service had carried out a mass DNA screening. The number of DNA samples taken was closer to 135. At the time of the murder, the service had only recently set up the world's first DNA database in April 1995. The forensic work was carried out by forensic scientist Hazel Johnson and a team of forensic scientists based in Wetherby.

== Further arrests ==
On 16 November 1995, four additional arrests were made. As a result of these arrests, one of the men, 19-year-old Edwin Hopkins was charged with the murder of Naomi Smith on the evening of 18 November 1995. Hopkins was held in custody and appeared at Nuneaton Magistrates Court on 20 November 1995. Hopkins spoke only to confirm his name, address and date of birth. His application for bail was refused and he was remanded in custody. The eight other suspects were later eliminated from the inquiry.

Hopkins was unemployed and lived with his parents close to the recreation ground where Naomi Smith was found.

== Tributes and memorial ==
On the evening of 21 September a memorial event was held in the recreation ground close to where Naomi's body had been found. Many local people had gathered and tributes were read out by family members and friends.

Naomi's funeral was held on 18 December 1995 with a ceremony at Chapel End Methodist Church. She was carried from the hearse in a white coffin decorated with flowers. The hearse was decorated with white flowers spelling out her name.

== Trial of Edwin Hopkins ==
The trial of Edwin Douglas Hopkins began on 22 January 1997 at Birmingham Crown Court.

At his trial, Hopkins was represented by Mr James Hunt QC. Hopkins maintained that on the evening of the murder he had been at his sister's house in Ansley Common playing Trivial Pursuit. He had gone out to the off-licence on his bicycle at approximately 9.30pm to buy beer and crisps. On the way to the off-licence, which was in the same area as the post box, Hopkins reported that he hadn't seen anyone or seen anything suspicious.

Hopkins' sister Julie gave evidence for the prosecution. Despite initially corroborating Edwin's story to police and providing him with an alibi, she later revealed that Edwin had taken longer to return from the off-licence than would have been needed. When he returned 45 minutes later he had changed into different clothes. Hopkins' explanation was that he had tried to buy milk and that he had been stopped for having no lights on his bicycle. Julie Hopkins also gave evidence regarding her brother's apparent obsession with knives which he collected, including large hunting knives.

Mr Colman Treacy QC for the prosecution told the jury that DNA evidence found on Naomi Smith's body matched that of Edwin Hopkins DNA in the order of 36 million to 1. Hopkins had supplied a DNA sample during the mass screening.

Andrew Walker a forensic odontologist appearing as a witness for the prosecution was asked to compare bite marks found on Naomi's breast with those of Hopkins, who had lost one of his front teeth in a fall from his bicycle, and his remaining teeth had moved to close the gap, therefore his teeth had an unusual profile. Walker told the jury that the cast of Hopkins teeth matched the bite mark exactly.

== Verdict and sentencing ==
The eleven-person jury took three and three-quarter hours to deliberate its verdict. Edwin Hopkins was found guilty of the murder of Naomi Smith on 30 January 1997 and sentenced to life imprisonment. He was convicted by a 10–1 majority verdict. In sentencing to life imprisonment, the judge made the recommendation that the minimum tariff was set to 20 years, which would keep him in prison until at least November 2015 and the age of 39.

In summing up the verdict, the judge, Mr Justice Tucker, said:

"You have been convicted of murdering a young innocent schoolgirl. It was a savage murder, a sadistic murder and you are a very dangerous young man."

On 6 February 1997, the Lord Chief Justice, Lord Bingham, made the recommendation to Home Secretary Michael Howard that the minimum term should be set to 17–18 years. On 20 May 1999, the new Home Secretary, Jack Straw, set Hopkins's minimum term to 18 years, meaning that Hopkins would be eligible for parole by November 2013 and the age of 37.

== Appeal ==
Edwin Hopkins has always maintained his innocence regarding the murder. In February 2004, some doubt was cast over Hopkins' conviction when a local man named Andrew Dexter was convicted of the torture and murder of his girlfriend Sharon Franklin. It emerged that Dexter had been questioned at the time of Naomi Smith's murder but released without charge. Despite this, police confirmed that the case would not be reopened and that Hopkins had been convicted on solid evidence.

In 2010, solicitors representing Edwin Hopkins made an application under section 276 and paragraph 3 of Schedule 22 of the Criminal Justice Act 2003 to have his minimum term reviewed, even though he was just now three years short of his earliest possible parole date. The Hon. Mr Justice King who reviewed the tariff, stated in his report dated 15 July 2010 that "the minimum term in this case is to be specified as 18 years", keeping the original tariff set by the Home Secretary. In 2021 he was moved to an open prison.

== Release and recall ==
Hopkins was released from prison in December 2023. Twenty three days after his release, Hopkins was recalled to prison after breaking one of the strict conditions put in place over his release.

== Media coverage ==
At the time of the murder and the subsequent trial the case was widely reported in the UK national media, including in newspapers, on television and on radio.

In 1998, forensic psychologist Paul Britton wrote about his experiences during the case in his book, The Jigsaw Man. The book has a whole chapter on the case as well as other high-profile cases. The case was also featured in a five-part series called Detective Stories hosted by John Stalker in the same year.

In 2001, the case was featured in a five-week run of documentary films produced by the BBC called Catching the Killers. The series was originally broadcast on BBC2. Solicitor, criminal barrister and author James Morton wrote a companion book of the same title to accompany the series.

In 2004, ITV Central television commissioned four half-hour documentary films covering significant cases in the Midlands region, including Naomi's murder. The series was titled To Catch A Killer and was originally broadcast in August of the same year.

In 2010 the case was the subject of an episode of a series dramatising real crimes called Cold Blood. The episode itself was called Close to Home and was originally broadcast in Canada. The series has since been rebranded for the European audience and has been shown on documentary channels including Discovery Channel and Investigation Discovery. The series, renamed TrueCSI, was shown on Channel 5 in the UK in September 2012 and featured interviews with Smith's father Brian Smith, retired Detective Superintendent Tony Bayliss who led the investigation and forensic psychologist Paul Britton.

In 2019, the Crime+Investigation Channel commissioned a second series of its production called Murdertown, which involved the close up investigation of a murder's impact on local communities. One of those ten episodes investigated the murder of Naomi Smith in Nuneaton.

== See also ==
- Capital punishment in the United Kingdom
- Child murder
