= Mark Phillips =

English equestrian (born 1948)

Captain Mark Phillips CVO
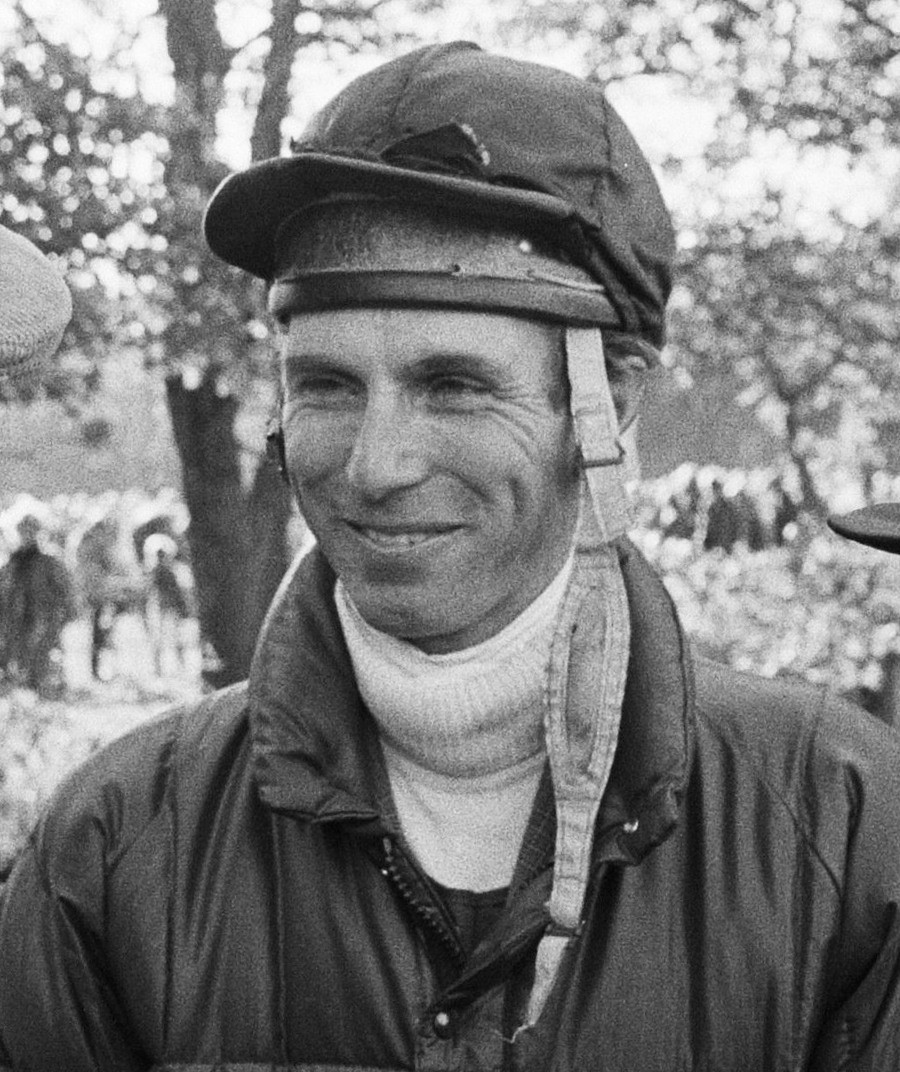
- Phillips in 1980

Personal information
- Born: Mark Anthony Peter Phillips; 22 September 1948 (age 78) Tetbury, Gloucestershire, England
- Education: Marlborough College; Royal Military Academy Sandhurst
- Spouses: Anne, Princess Royal (m. 1973; div. 1992) Sandy Pflueger (m. 1997; sep. 2012)
- Children: Peter Phillips; Zara Tindall; Felicity Wade; Stephanie Hosier

Sport
- Sport: Horse riding
Medal record
Representing Great Britain
Olympics
Gold medal – first place	1972 Munich	Team eventing
Silver medal – second place	1988 Seoul	Team eventing
World Championships
Gold medal – first place	1970 Punchestown	Team eventing
Silver medal – second place	1974 Burghley	Team eventing
European Championships
Gold medal – first place	1971 Burghley	Team eventing
- Military career
- Allegiance: United Kingdom
- Branch: British Army
- Service years: 1969–1978
- Unit: 1st The Queen's Dragoon Guards

Mark Anthony Peter Phillips (born 22 September 1948) is an English Olympic gold medal-winning horseman who competed for Great Britain. He was the first husband of Anne, Princess Royal, with whom he has two children. Phillips is a leading figure in British equestrian circles, a noted eventing course designer and a columnist for Horse & Hound magazine.

== Family background and early life ==
Mark Anthony Peter Phillips was born on 22 September 1948. He is the son of Major Peter William Garside Phillips, MC (1920–1998) and Anne Patricia Phillips (née Tiarks; 1925–1988). Mark had a younger sister, Sarah Anne Staples (née Phillips; 1951–2014).

His father was the younger son of Joseph Herbert Phillips and Dorothea Mary Land, and the grandson of William Garside Phillips. His paternal uncle, Joseph Anthony Moore Phillips, married Lady Katharine Fitzalan-Howard, a daughter of Henry Fitzalan-Howard, 15th Duke of Norfolk. His patrilineal great-great-grandfather was the portrait painter William Moore and his great-granduncles included the artists Albert Joseph Moore, Henry Moore and John Collingham Moore. His mother was educated at Downe House and served in the Women's Royal Naval Service during the Second World War. She was the only daughter of John Gerhard Edward Tiarks (1896–1962) and his wife, Evelyn Florence Cripps (1899–1994). John served in the First and Second World Wars, attained the rank of Brigadier and was aide-de-camp to King George VI from 1947 to 1950. Phillips is a relative of Henrietta Russell (nee Tiarks), Duchess of Bedford through his mother.

Phillips was educated at Stouts Hill Preparatory School near Uley, Gloucestershire, then at Marlborough College, then the Royal Military Academy Sandhurst.

== Military career ==
On 25 July 1969, upon passing out from Sandhurst, Phillips was commissioned as a second Lieutenant into the 1st The Queen's Dragoon Guards, British Army. He was promoted to lieutenant on 25 January 1971. By the time of his wedding to Princess Anne in November 1973, he was serving as an acting captain. In January 1974, he was appointed a personal aide-de-camp (ADC(P)) to Queen Elizabeth II. Phillips was promoted to substantive captain on 25 July 1975. He retired from the Army on 30 March 1978.

Phillips continued to style himself Captain Mark Phillips after his retirement from the army. It is customary for retired cavalry captains to retain their former rank when their civilian occupation involves working with horses, particularly in racing or equestrian sports.

== Equestrian career ==
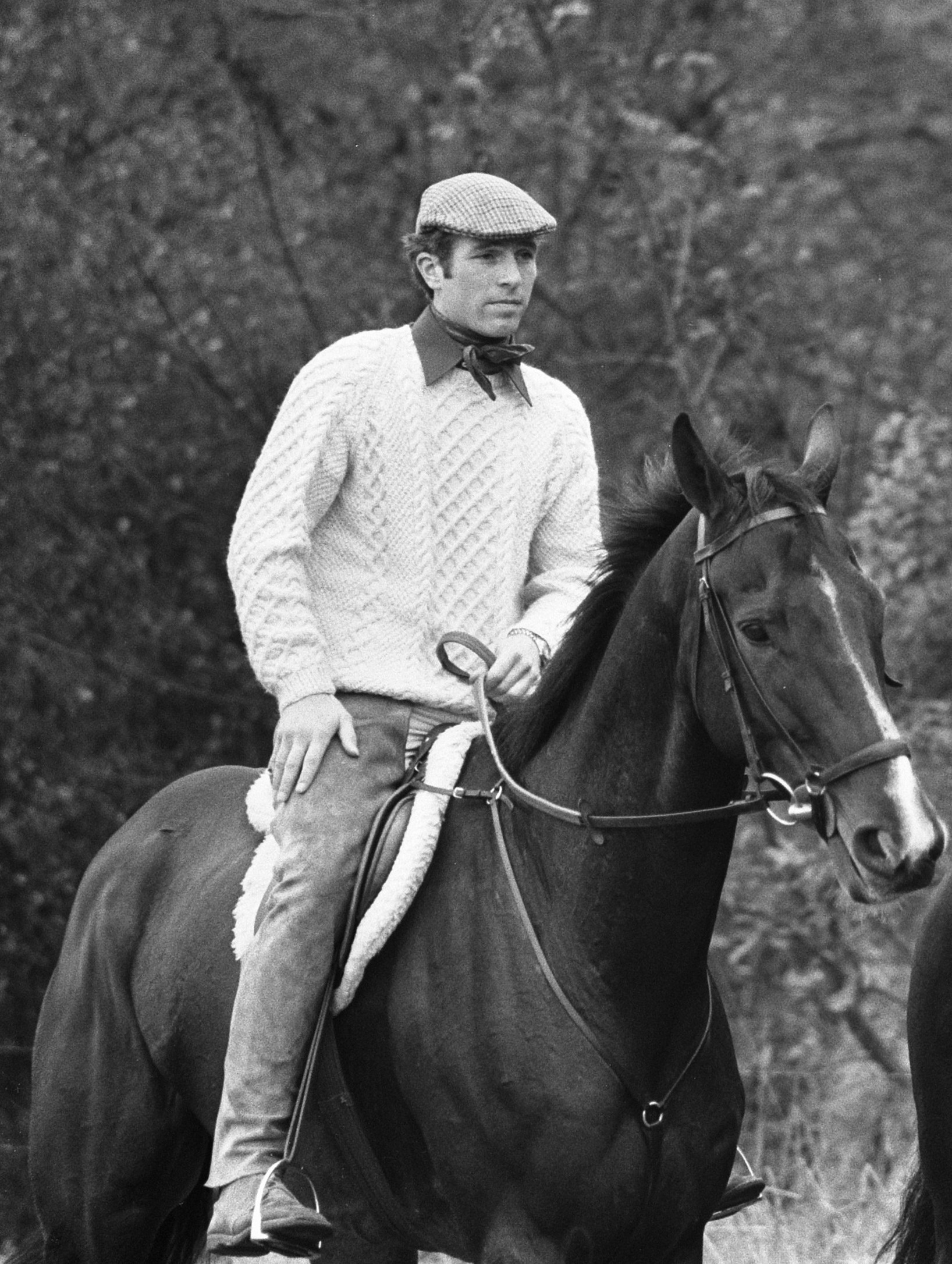
Mark Phillips in 1973

Phillips was a reserve member of the British equestrian team for the 1968 Olympics. He was part of the British three-day event teams that won a world title in 1970, a European title in 1971 and Olympic gold medals in 1972; individually, he finished in 35th place at the 1972 games. At the 1988 Olympics, his horse sustained a pulled muscle and could not complete the individual three-day event, but Phillips won a silver medal with the British team. He was a four-time champion at the Badminton Horse Trials: in 1971 and 1972 on Great Ovation, in 1974 on Colombus and in 1981 on Lincoln. It was through his equestrian activities that he met Princess Anne, the only daughter of Queen Elizabeth II and Prince Philip, Duke of Edinburgh, whom he later married. Their daughter Zara Phillips won a silver medal in the three-day event with the British team at the 2012 Olympics in London.

In 1998, Phillips designed the cross-country venue for the Red Hills Horse Trials, a qualifying event for the Olympics held in Tallahassee, Florida, United States. He is now a regular columnist for Horse & Hound magazine. He remains a leading figure in British equestrian circles and serves as Chef d'Equipe of the United States Eventing Team.

In 2025, Phillips designed the cross-country course for 2025 European Eventing Championships.

== Personal life ==
Phillips first met his future wife, Princess Anne, at a party for horse enthusiasts in 1968. They married on 14 November 1973 at Westminster Abbey. They have two children: Peter (born 1977) and Zara (born 1981). The Queen bought Gatcombe Park, near Minchinhampton, for the couple as a wedding present.

In August 1989, Phillips and Anne announced their intention to separate, as the marriage had been under strain for several years. The couple had rarely been seen in public together and had been romantically linked with other people. They continued to share custody of their children and initially stated that "there were no plans for divorce." During this period, Phillips continued to work at the couple's estate at Gatcombe Park. In 1991, a DNA test confirmed that he had fathered a daughter, Felicity Tonkin, born in August 1985 in New Zealand to art teacher Heather Tonkin. Phillips and Anne divorced on 23 April 1992.

On 1 February 1997, Phillips married Sandy Pflueger, an American Olympic dressage rider. Their daughter, Stephanie, was born on 2 October 1997. She grew up at Aston Farm, Gatcombe Park, close to the family of Anne, and served as a bridesmaid at the wedding of her half-sister Zara. In 2000, Phillips was appointed an Honorary Liveryman of the Worshipful Company of Farmers.

On 3 May 2012, Phillips' solicitors confirmed that he and Pflueger had separated and intended to divorce, with Phillips becoming involved with American equestrian Lauren Hough.

Phillips' personal wealth is estimated to be around £15–20 million. The settlement he received when his marriage to Anne ended was described as "modest" and reported to be around "$3 million".

On 19 September 2022, Philips was present at the committal service at St George's Chapel for his former mother-in-law Queen Elizabeth II.

== Honours and arms ==
=== Military ranks ===
- (United Kingdom) Captain (Retired), late Queen's Dragoon Guards

=== Honours ===
==== British honours ====
- 15 August 1974: Commander of the Royal Victorian Order (CVO)
- 6 February 1977: Queen Elizabeth II Silver Jubilee Medal
- 6 February 2002: Queen Elizabeth II Golden Jubilee Medal
- 6 February 2012: Queen Elizabeth II Diamond Jubilee Medal
- 6 February 2022: Queen Elizabeth II Platinum Jubilee Medal
- 6 May 2023: King Charles III Coronation Medal

==== Honorary military appointments ====
- 1 January 1974: Personal Aide-de-Camp to the Queen (ADC)

==== Foreign honours ====
- Norway: Commander with Star of the Royal Norwegian Order of Saint Olav, 13 April 1988.

=== Arms ===
Coat of arms of Mark Phillips
Notes These arms were granted to Peter Phillips, the father of Captain Mark Phillips, in October 1973. Mark used these arms differenced with a three point label until he inherited the undifferenced arms from his father in 1998. He was granted hereditary supporters, a rare privilege for untitled people. Crest On a Wreath of the colours, a spur rowed upward or, winged argent, enclosing a lozenge sable. Escutcheon Per chevron azure and Or, in chief a horse courant argent, and in base a sprig of forget-me-not flowers, slipped and leaved proper. Supporters On the dexter side a winged lion, and on the sinister side a winged horse Argent, each gorged with a representation of the Coronet of HRH The Princess Anne proper. Motto Pro rege et patria (For king and country). Orders Royal Victorian Order

== Issue ==
By Princess Anne

Name	Birth	Marriage		Issue
Peter Phillips	15 November 1977	17 May 2008; Divorced 14 June 2021	Autumn Kelly	Savannah Phillips; Isla Phillips
Peter Phillips	15 November 1977	6 June 2026	Harriet Sperling	
Zara Phillips	15 May 1981	30 July 2011	Mike Tindall	Mia Tindall; Lena Tindall; Lucas Tindall

By Heather Tonkin

Name	Birth	Marriage		Issue
Felicity Tonkin	10 August 1985	March 2015	Tristan Wade	James Wade

By Sandy Pflueger

Name	Birth	Marriage		Issue
Stephanie Phillips	2 October 1997	8 July 2022	William Hosier	
