= Maureen Stephenson =

English author (1927–2008)

- Maureen Stephenson in 1983
- Born: Maureen Duffy; 14 February 1927; Manchester, England
- Died: 5 July 2008 (aged 81); Ansley, Warwickshire, England
- Known for: Author
- Spouses: Louis John Stephenson (m. 1954; died 2011)
- Children: 3

Maureen Stephenson (14 February 1927 - 5 July 2008) was an author of romantic, gothic and contemporary mysteries.

== Personal life ==
Stephenson was born to father Joseph Duffy, a tailor, and mother Anne, née Byrom. She attended high school in London. She married Louis John Stephenson, an engineer and later Warwickshire County councillor, in 1954. They had three children. She lived at Ansley Mill Farm, Ansley, from 1978 until her death. The mill is thought to be the inspiration for George Eliot's 1860 novel The Mill on the Floss.

== Work in film ==
She worked as a production secretary and in film continuity at several major studios, notably Shepperton Studios from 1944-1947, Pinewood Studios from 1948-1950, Denham Studios from 1950-1952 and Ealing Studios from 1952–1954. Of this work, she said "I found working on film scripts invaluable in learning how to build up a story and a character."

Films on which she worked included:

- Anna Karenina (1948) Dir. Julien Duvivier
- Maria Chapdelaine (1950) Dir. Marc Allégret
- Men Against the Sun (1953) Dir. Brendan J. Stafford
- The Square Ring (1953) Dir. Basil Dearden
- Isn't Life Wonderful! (1953) Dir. Harold French

== Writing ==
Stephenson started writing when her father paid for her to take a correspondence course in fiction writing, about which she said, "In my opinion, such courses are the best way to start." While on holiday in the Yorkshire Dales in 1977 she started writing romantic mysteries. She was influenced by the Brontë sisters, stating that "They achieve a mystical otherworldliness that I admire." The majority of her books were published through Robert Hale.

- Ride the Dark Moors (1977) Pub. Zebra Books, also published in German
- The House on Wath Moor (1979) Pub. Zebra Books, also published in German
- The Flowers of Tomorrow (1980)
- House on the Heath (1982) A reprint of Wath Moor with a new title. Pub. Zebra Books
- Autumn of Deception (1982)
- Roses have Thorns (1983)
- The Enchanted Desert (1986), also published in Norwegian
- Snow in my Heart (1987)
- Never Too Late (1992)
- The Love Dance (1996)
- I'll Wait Forever (1996)
- Dance Amongst Thorns (1996) Pub. Cosmax Co
- Kiwi Sunset (2006)

=== Legal issue ===
Unbeknownst to Stephenson – Wath Moor US publication rights were unlawfully "sold" to an American named Elliot as part of a tax evasion scheme in which expenses and purported losses associated with publication were to be used to reduce the buyer's liability for income tax. The plan did not succeed.

== Other ==
She published a small run of A Brief History of Ansley around 2000. She was a featured author as part of the second World Book Day in 1999.
