= Community and District Nursing Association =

Former trade union of the United Kingdom

- Merged into: GMB
- Founded: 1939
- Dissolved: 2010
- Headquarters: Thames Valley University, Ealing, London
- Location: United Kingdom
- Members: 3,763 (2007)
- Affiliations: TUC
- Website: www.cdna-online.org.uk

The Community and District Nursing Association (CDNA) was a trade union representing nurses and healthcare assistants in the United Kingdom.

The union was founded in 1939 as the District Nursing Association. In 1971, it was renamed as the "Community and District Nursing Association". It affiliated to the Trades Union Congress, and membership had risen to 3,763 by 2007. It worked closely with the GMB trade union for many years, and in 2010 decided to merge with it.
