= Joseph Phillips (Australian cricketer) =

Australian cricketer

Personal information
- Born: 22 April 1840; Parramatta, Sydney, Australia
- Died: 7 May 1901 (aged 61); Heidelberg, Victoria, Australia

Domestic team information
- Years: Team
- 1865-1871: Victoria
- Source: Cricinfo, 3 May 2015

Joseph Phillips (22 April 1840 – 7 May 1901) was an Australian cricketer. He played six first-class cricket matches for Victoria between 1865 and 1871.

== See also ==
- List of Victoria first-class cricketers
