= Joseph Phillips (English cricketer, born 1881) =

English cricketer

Personal information
- Full name: Joseph Herbert Phillips
- Born: 2 December 1881; Ansley, Warwickshire, England
- Died: 15 January 1951 (aged 69); Nuneaton, Warwickshire, England
- Batting: Right-handed
- Bowling: Right-arm fast

Domestic team information
- Years: Team
- 1904–1911: Warwickshire

Career statistics
| Competition | First-class |
|---|---|
| Matches | 6 |
| Runs scored | 35 |
| Batting average | 5.00 |
| 100s/50s | –/– |
| Top score | 16 |
| Balls bowled | 246 |
| Wickets | 1 |
| Bowling average | 159.00 |
| 5 wickets in innings | – |
| 10 wickets in match | – |
| Best bowling | 1/30 |
| Catches/stumpings | 5/– |
- Source: Cricinfo, 11 October 2015

Joseph Herbert Phillips (2 December 1881 – 15 January 1951) was an English cricketer active in first-class cricket from 1904–1911. He played as a right-handed batsman and right-arm fast bowler.

The son of William Garside Phillips, the managing director of the Ansley Hall Coal and Iron Company, he was born at Ansley Hall in the Warwickshire village of Ansley on 2 December 1881.

Phillips made his debut in first-class cricket for Warwickshire against London County in 1904 at Coventry. He had to wait until 1910 for his next first-class match, which came when Warwickshire played Northamptonshire in the County Championship. He made three further appearances in 1910, before playing a final first-class match in 1911 against Leicestershire. He had little success as a first-class cricketer, scoring 35 runs across his six matches, with a high score of 16. With the ball in hand he took just one wicket from a total of 41 overs bowled. Outside of cricket Phillips was by profession a mining engineer. He married Dorothea Mary Land in 1912, with the couple having three children. Their eldest son, Joseph Anthony Moore Phillips, became a lieutenant colonel in the British Army and later became the Deputy Lieutenant of the now defunct county of Humberside. Their second son, Peter William Garside Phillips, became a major in the army. Their daughter, Dorothea Flavia Phillips, was a senior commander with the Auxiliary Territorial Service, and was awarded an MBE (Military Division) in 1943 for her service. Peter's son, Mark Phillips, became a successful Olympic gold-medal-winning horseman for Great Britain, and married Anne, Princess Royal.
