= William Garside Phillips =

Pioneering colliery manager

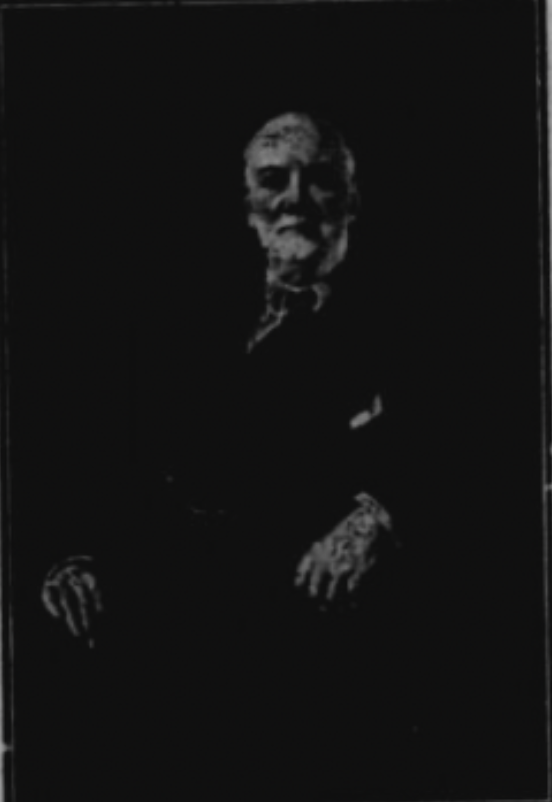
- Garside in a 1929 newspaper
- Born: 20 January 1849; Hyde, Manchester
- Died: 1 January 1929 (aged 79); Ansley, Warwickshire
- Known for: Mining; Mining education
- Spouse(s): Emma Phillips, née Grundy (m. 1871; death 1921)
- Children: 5

William Garside Phillips JP (13 April 1849 - 1 January 1929) was an English pioneer in mining education, the managing director of Ansley Hall Colliery and chair of the Atherstone Rural District Association from 1907 to 1929. He was called The Field Marshal of Warwickshire Coalfield.

== Family and personal life ==
William Garside Phillips was born in Hyde, Manchester to John Phillips and Eliza Wilde, into “a nest of colliers”. He married Emma Grundy (1848–1921) in 1871. They had five children: Annie Mary Helps (1873–1951), Edith Tew (1878–1947), Gertrude Tremlett (1880–1960), Joseph Herbert Phillips (1881–1951) and Coningsby Wilde Phillips (1884–1964). The family moved to Warwickshire in 1879.

=== Death ===
Phillips died at Ansley Hall on New Year's Day 1929. At his funeral, a wagon carrying over 100 wreaths, “a great many of which were representative ones sent from big groups of people” followed the procession. In March 1931, the Phillips family made a donation to St Lawrence Church, Ansley, consisting of a new West Window, designed by Karl Parsons, an oak screen, choir stalls and electric lighting, all dedicated to Phillips’ memory. At the dedication service the Bishop of Coventry delivered the address.

== Mining ==
Phillips began working at Hyde and Haughton Collieries at the age of nine. At 17 he was made a manager and at a “comparative young age” he earned the Mine Manager's certificate. His studies involved walking eight miles to Queen's College, Manchester and back, for evening classes, following a 13-hour shift in the mine.

In December 1879 he moved to Warwickshire to become managing director of Ansley Hall Coal and Iron Company's colliery. At that point the colliery was “in a more or less critical condition” and Phillips “converted an unprofitable undertaking into one of the most up-to-date and successful pits in the country. He was the Warwickshire pioneer in substituting electric haulage underground for ponies 39 years ago.” He was described as the “Field-Marshal of the Warwickshire coalfield”.

== Mining roles ==
- Warwickshire Coalfield Wage Board, chair
- Warwickshire Coal Owners’ Association, chair
- Warwickshire School of Mining, founder
- Chesterfield and Midland Institute of Mining Engineers, president
- Warwickshire Mining Students’ Association, president
- Mining Association of Great Britain, Warwickshire representative

== Community ==
Phillips was the leader of the Nuneaton division of the Conservative and Unionist Party but declined an invitation to contest Nuneaton's parliamentary seat. In 1904 he donated land for Ansley's village school, which was established in 1906. In 1906 he became Justice of the peace for Warwickshire, taking his seat on the Atherstone bench. Other roles included:

- Nuneaton Conservative Party, chair
- Ansley Parish Council, chair
- Atherstone Board of Guardians, chair
- Board of guardians Vaccination Committee, chair
- Atherstone Rural District Council, chair (1907–1929)
- Nuneaton Gas Company, vice-chair
- Ansley and District Agricultural and Horticultural Society, founder and president (1900–1929)
- Nuneaton Town Cricket Club, president
- Charity of St John Twycross and John Perkins, trustee
