= Coventry and Warwickshire Society of Artists =

English art society

- Abbreviation: CWSA
- Formation: February 1912
- Location(s): Coventry and Warwickshire, England

The Coventry and Warwickshire Society of Artists or CWSA is an art society, that runs various social events and artistic programmes in Coventry, and outside and within the Warwickshire area of England.

== History ==
The Coventry and Warwickshire Society of Artists (CWSA) was established by the Mayor of Coventry, Colonel William Fitzthomas Wyley in February 1912.

=== Presidents ===
- First president: Soloman Joseph Soloman R.A.
- until 1962: Sir William Orpen A.R.A. and Dame Laura Knight R.A.
- until 1981: Rolf Hellberg F.R.I.B.A. (Coventry Architect)
- Dr Anthony Francis Hobson (Art Historian)
- David Shepherd O.B.E.
- Marquess of Hertford, of Ragley Hall
- 2012: Jane Powell
- 2020: Nancy Upshall

=== Vice-Presidents ===
- Sir Frank Brangwyn R.A., R.W.S., R.B.A.
- Sir David Young Cameron R.A.
- Sir William Russell Flint
- Sir David Murray R.A.
- Arthur Rackham
- Sir Alfred Herbert (Major Benefactor of the Herbert Art Gallery and Museum)
- Sir Jacob Epstein
- Sir Francis Alexander Newdigate Newdegate
- Sir Edward Illife
- Sir Hugh Casson
- Dame Elisabeth Jean Frink

== CASE ==
The society is part of CASE: Coventry Art Societies Exhibition which was founded in April 2001 and was formerly known as the Coventry Arts Consortium. It is made up of four Coventry art societies, the other three being, Baginton Art Group, Coventry Art Guild and Coventry Watercolour Society.
