= Whitacre Junction railway station =

Former railway station in England

Whitacre Junction
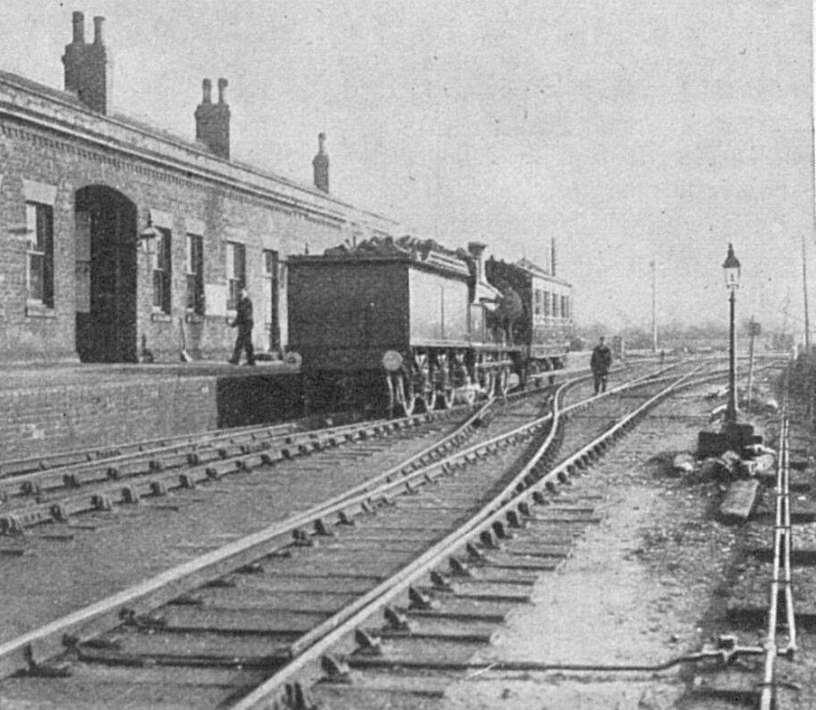
- The One Engine and the One Carriage on the Hampton-in-Arden to Whitacre branch of the Midland Railway at Whitacre, from The Sketch, 28 August 1907

General information
- Location: England
- Coordinates: 52.5200°N 1.6795°W

Other information
- Status: Disused

History
- Original company: Birmingham and Derby Junction Railway
- Pre-grouping: Midland Railway
- Post-grouping: London, Midland and Scottish Railway

Key dates
- 10 February 1842: Station opens as Whitacre Junction
- 1 November 1864: closed and replaced
- 1 October 1904: renamed Whitacre
- 4 March 1968: Station closes
Location

Lines around Whitacre Junction

Whitacre Junction railway station was opened in 1864 by the Midland Railway. It served the village of Whitacre Heath, Warwickshire, England.

== History ==
The line had been opened in 1839 by the Birmingham and Derby Junction Railway from Derby, to a south-facing junction with the London and Birmingham Railway just north of Hampton-in-Arden.

Due to increasing traffic, and the inconvenience of having to reverse trains at Hampton-in-Arden to reach Birmingham Curzon Street, a branch was built in 1842 west from Whitacre to a new Midland Railway passenger station at Birmingham Lawley Street. The station opened to serve this junction.

The Midland Railway generally used the London and North-Western Railway Trent Valley Line and Great Northern Railway tracks to reach London, so the line south to Hampton faded into obscurity. By 1907 the 6½ mile route to Hampton-in-Arden was used by only 1 train per day.

In 1864, the Midland built a new line eastwards to Nuneaton. It is not clear when the original station was built, but it was moved 60 chains further south at this time.

In 1909 a cutoff line was built between Water Orton and Kingsbury.

The station closed on 4 March 1968.

== Stationmasters ==
- John M. Shelly ca. 1850
- Charles Broad ca. 1859 - 1872
- Joseph Brindley 1872- 1888 (formerly station master at Wichnor Junction, afterwards station master at Widmerpool)
- George Lambert 1888 - ca. 1914 (formerly station master at Widmerpool)
- H.J. Turner until 1948 (afterwards station master at Selly Oak)
- S.W. Jamieson 1956 - 1958 (formerly station master at Peplow, afterwards station master at Lakeside, Windermere)
- Mr. Peake from 1958 (formerly station master at Endon, Stoke-on-Trent)

== Route ==
Preceding station	Historical railways	Following station
Coleshill; Line and station open	Midland Railway; Birmingham to Leicester Line	Shustoke; Line open, station closed
Kingsbury; Line open, station closed	Midland Railway; Stonebridge Railway	Maxstoke; Line and station closed
