= Lea Marston =

Coordinates: 52.538°N 1.702°W

- Location within Warwickshire
- Population: 398 (2021 census)
- OS grid reference: SP2093
- Civil parish: Lea Marston
- District: North Warwickshire
- Shire county: Warwickshire
- Region: West Midlands
- Country: England
- Sovereign state: United Kingdom
- Post town: SUTTON COLDFIELD
- Postcode district: B76
- Dialling code: 01675
- Police: Warwickshire
- Fire: Warwickshire
- Ambulance: West Midlands
- UK Parliament: North Warwickshire

Lea Marston is a village and civil parish on the River Tame in Warwickshire, England, about 7 miles (11 km) south-west of Atherstone. Lea Marston is close to the county boundary with the West Midlands and about 4.5 miles (7.2 km) east of Sutton Coldfield. in the 2021 census the parish had a population of 398.

== Manor ==
The Domesday Book of 1086 records that Robert Despenser held estates of nine hides at "Merston" and one hide at "Leth". By 1235 Robert Marmion of Tamworth Castle held Marston and by 1253 the de la Launde family held Lea. By the early part of the 16th century the two manors were referred to together and were generally held together. The Adderley family acquired Lea Marston in the first half of the 17th century when Charles Adderley married Anne Arden of Park Hall in Castle Bromwich. It descended in the family to Charles Bowyer Adderley, who was created 1st Baron Norton in 1878 and still held Lea Marston in 1905. Adderley manor house was remodelled for the Adderley family in the 18th century and was called Hams Hall.

== Parish church ==
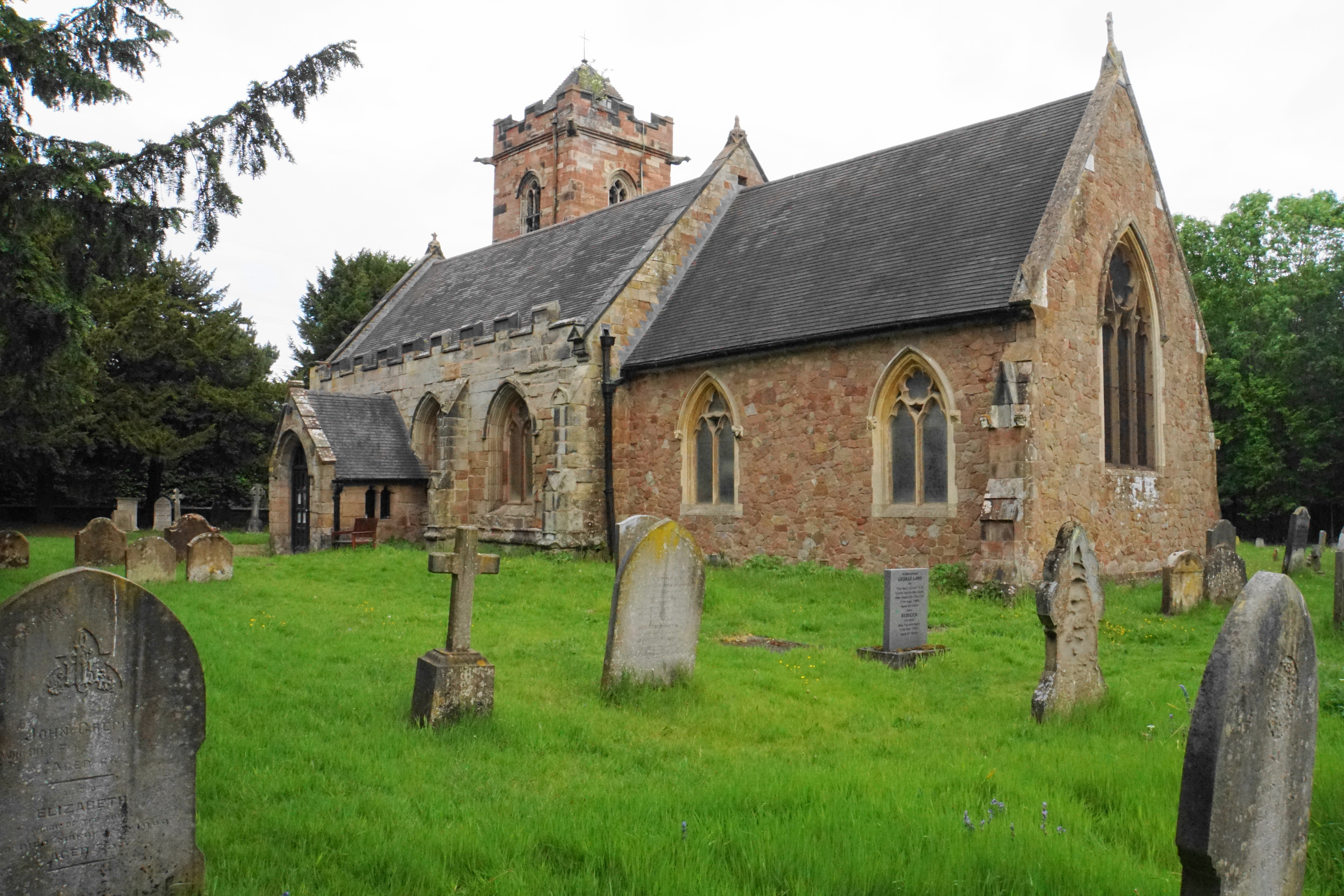
Church of St John the Baptist, Lea Marston

The Church of England parish church of Saint John the Baptist seems to have existed by 1252, when it was a dependent chapelry of Coleshill parish church and was granted to the Benedictine Markyate Priory. The south wall of the nave and possibly the north wall date from this era. Two windows in the north wall are early 14th century in style. The nave was extended 9 feet (2.7 m) westwards in the 15th century for the addition of a bell-cot. The south porch is another addition that seems to date from the 15th century. In 1876-77 the chancel was rebuilt and the north-west tower was added.

The tower has three bells, the oldest of which was cast by John Rudhall of Gloucester in 1791. The other two were cast by John Taylor & Co of Loughborough in 1855 and 1873. The church contains numerous monuments to members of the Adderley family, including one from 1784 made of Coade stone. The Rev. Thomas Bray was briefly vicar of Lea Marston in about 1693. Dr Bray later founded the Society for Promoting Christian Knowledge in 1699 and the Society for Propagating the Gospel in Foreign Parts in 1701.

== Economic history ==
There are records of a watermill in the parish in the Domesday Book of 1086, and again in 1291 and 1703. In 1909 a section of the Midland Railway was built through Lea Marston parish linking Kingsbury and Water Orton to bypass Whitacre Junction. The line passes immediately south-east of Lea Marston village but there is no station. In the 20th century there were three Hams Hall Power Stations in the parish. Hams Hall A was built in 1927-29, Hams Hall B in 1949 and Hams Hall C in 1958. They were decommissioned in 1975, 1981 and 1992 respectively and each was demolished within a few years of closure. The site has since been redeveloped as Hams Hall Distribution Park. Lea Marston has a four-star hotel (the Lea Marston Hotel) and a curry house - The Pavilion

== Sources ==
- Pevsner, Nikolaus; Wedgwood, Alexandra (1966). Warwickshire. The Buildings of England. Harmondsworth: Penguin Books. p. 332.
- Salzman, L.F., ed. (1947). A History of the County of Warwick, Volume 4: Hemlingford Hundred. Victoria County History. pp. 114–116.
