= Coleshill Parkway railway station =

Railway station serving Coleshill in Warwickshire, England

Coordinates: 52.517°N 1.708°W

Coleshill Parkway
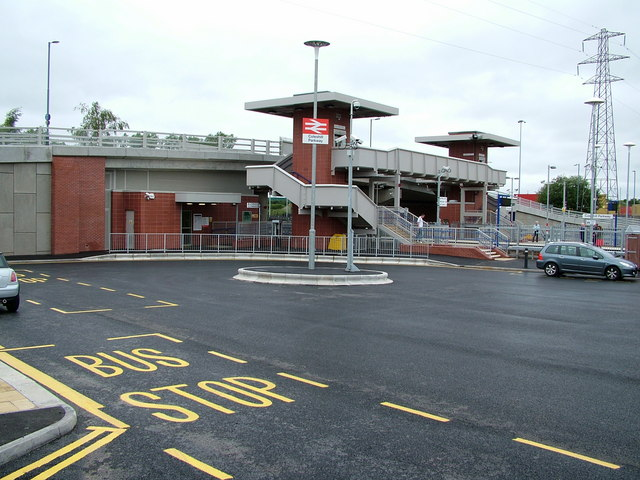

General information
- Location: Coleshill, Warwickshire; England
- Grid reference: SP198910
- Manager: West Midlands Trains
- Platforms: 2

Other information
- Station code: CEH
- Classification: DfT category E

Key dates
- 10 February 1842: Opened as Forge Mills
- 1 November 1849: Renamed Forge Mills for Coleshill
- 1 April 1904: Renamed Forge Mills
- 9 July 1923: Renamed Coleshill
- 4 March 1968: Closed
- 18 September 2007: Reopened as Coleshill Parkway

Passengers
- 2021/22: ▲0.128 million
- 2022/23: ▲0.164 million
- 2023/24: ▲0.187 million
- 2024/25: ▲0.206 million
- 2025/26: ▲0.244 million
Location
Notes
- Passenger statistics from the Office of Rail and Road

Coleshill Parkway is a railway station at Hams Hall on the Birmingham to Peterborough railway line, serving Coleshill in Warwickshire, England. Sitting on the site of the former Coleshill station which closed in 1968, the current station was opened in 2007. Unusually it is not owned by Network Rail. It is managed by West Midlands Trains, although all rail services are operated by CrossCountry.

== History ==
=== First station (1842–1968) ===
The first station at the site was opened in 1842, by the Birmingham and Derby Junction Railway on its line from Whitacre Junction to Lawley Street, and was originally known as Forge Mills. A second station nearby had previously been called 'Coleshill' but this was on the Stonebridge Railway; a different line nearby. In 1923 this second station (which had lost its passenger service in 1917) was renamed Maxstoke, and Forge Mills station was renamed Coleshill.

However this second Coleshill station, the former Forge Mills, was closed in March 1968.

The site of Forge Mills station.

=== Current station ===
After the closure of the station. Coleshill was left with no railway connection, and as a result the nearest stations to the town were Water Orton, Atherstone and Marston Green. In 2006, work started on a new station called Coleshill Parkway which was built and opened on the site of the former Coleshill (Forge Mills) station. The new station was originally scheduled to open in Spring 2007, but construction delays postponed the opening to 18 September 2007. The new station cost £9 million to build. It was jointly funded by the Department for Transport, Warwickshire County Council and the John Laing Group, with developer contributions secured by North Warwickshire Borough Council. The opening ceremony was attended by the son of the last stationmaster of the old station.

== Facilities ==
Facilities on site include a 200-space car park and a ticket office. Many signs are in place for local access to the station.

The station incorporates a bus interchange providing direct bus connections to Birmingham city centre on the X13 operated by National Express West Midlands and infrequent journeys on service 76 to Sutton Coldfield and Tamworth which is operated by Diamond Bus. Previously a service to Birmingham Airport was operated but this service (Claribel Coaches 75) was withdrawn in 2022.

== Services ==
Two trains an hour operate in each direction (including Sundays); two eastbound towards Nuneaton and Leicester, with hourly extensions to Peterborough, Cambridge and Stansted Airport and two westbound to Birmingham New Street.

Preceding station	National Rail	Following station
Water Orton	CrossCountry Birmingham - Leicester	Nuneaton
Birmingham New Street	CrossCountry Birmingham - Leicester	Nuneaton
	Historical railways	
Water Orton	Midland Railway; Birmingham–Peterborough line	Whitacre Junction
