= Maxstoke =

Coordinates: 52.478625°N 1.654834°W

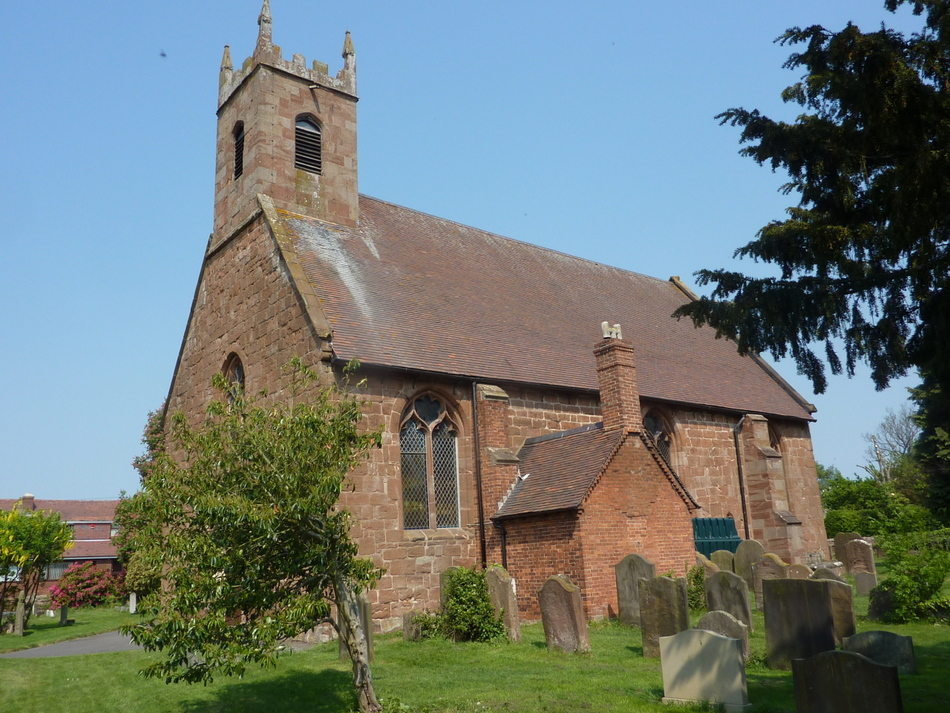
- Church of St Michael and All Angels

- Location within Warwickshire
- Population: 270 (2021 Census)
- OS grid reference: SP235868
- Civil parish: Maxstoke
- District: North Warwickshire
- Shire county: Warwickshire
- Region: West Midlands
- Country: England
- Sovereign state: United Kingdom
- Post town: BIRMINGHAM
- Postcode district: B46
- Dialling code: 01675
- Police: Warwickshire
- Fire: Warwickshire
- Ambulance: West Midlands
- UK Parliament: North Warwickshire and Bedworth

Maxstoke is a hamlet and civil parish in the North Warwickshire district of the county of Warwickshire, England. It is situated approximately 2.5 miles north of Meriden. Maxstoke and the parish of Maxstoke were established in the hundred of Hemlingford. The population of the parish was 270 at the 2021 census.

== Maxstoke Priory ==
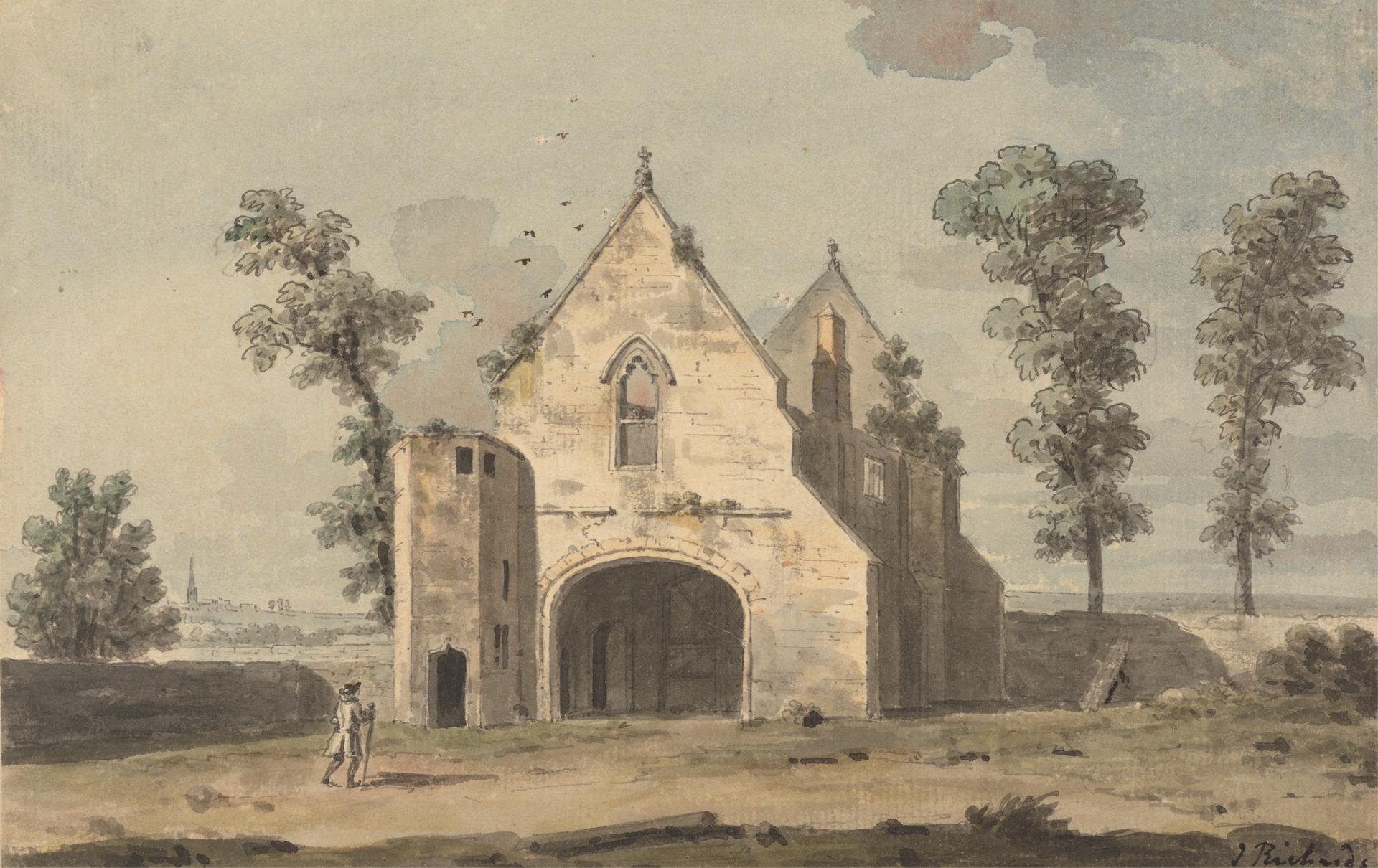
18th-century watercolour by John Inigo Richards

The Priory was established by Sir William de Clinton in 1331 when he endowed a College of Priests consisting of five chaplains and a warden. It was built adjacent to an earlier moated farmstead, south of his castle towards Packington village. In 1336 it was expanded to a full Priory for Augustinian Canons and was completed in 1343. It was dissolved in 1536, when the buildings and lands were granted to Charles Brandon. Today only ruins remain with the exception of the Inner Gatehouse. This was a farmhouse in the Elizabethan period and is now a bed and breakfast establishment. Inside is a room with painted armorial shields. The entrance to the farm is by the Outer Gatehouse. The two niches are now empty of statues. On the ends of the drip mouldings over the central window are two busts, one of a knight with his visor down and another of a monk. In the fields around the priory can be seen traces of medieval earthworks for fish farming and water control. The Parish Church of St Michael is of the same age as that of the Priory. The remains of a 14th-century preaching cross can be seen in the churchyard.

== Maxstoke Castle ==
To the north of Maxstoke, about halfway towards Shustoke, is Maxstoke Castle. It was built by Sir William de Clinton, in 1345. It is of a square plan with a broad moat. Additions were made by Humphrey Stafford who acquired it in 1437 by exchanging it for other manors in Northamptonshire.

== Railway ==
Maxstoke railway station was opened on Maxstoke Lane and was on the Stonebridge Railway line. It connected Birmingham New Street with Derby and Hampton-in-Arden. The station had closed in the 1930s along with the connection line. The site of the platform and sign can still be seen today. It was also located near the town of Coleshill.

== Handley Page O/400 crash ==
On 19 August 1918 a Royal Air Force (RAF) Handley Page O/400 from No. 14 Aircraft Acceptance Park RAF took off from Castle Bromwich Aerodrome on a test flight. While flying over North Warwickshire, the pilots lost control of the aircraft and crashed into a field at Maxstoke, killing all seven crew on board. The pilots were Canadian Lt Robert Edward Andrew MacBeth and Lt Frederick James Bravery. The other crew members were air mechanics Charles William Offord, J. May, Albert J. Winrow, H. Simmons and G. Greenland. MacBeth and Simmons were buried in St. Michael's Church graveyard. The cause of the accident was determined to be loss of control due to wing failure when the aircraft lost fabric from a wing. It was the deadliest accident involving the new Royal Air Force at the time.
