= Lawley Street railway station (London and North Western Railway) =

Disused railway station in Birmingham, United Kingdom

Lawley Street

General information
- Location: Birmingham; England
- Coordinates: 52.4822°N 1.8791°W
- Platforms: 2

Other information
- Status: Disused

History
- Original company: London and North Western Railway
- Pre-grouping: London and North Western Railway

Key dates
- 1 October 1854: Opened
- 1 March 1869: Closed
Location

Lawley Street railway station was opened in 1854 by the London and North Western Railway in Birmingham, England. It was closed in 1869.

== History ==
The station was opened on 1 October 1854 by the London and North Western Railway between Birmingham New Street and Vauxhall goods station on the Lawley Street viaduct of the former Grand Junction Railway, approximately 150 metres northwest of the separate Birmingham and Derby Junction Railway Lawley Street terminus sited on lower ground, which by then was operated as a goods station by the rival Midland Railway. The LNWR station was located approximately three quarters of a mile from New Street station. The station was served by trains running between New Street and Walsall.

The station was closed on 1 March 1869 and replaced with the rebuilt Vauxhall (now Duddeston) station, which was reopened to passengers the same day.
