= Derby London Road railway station =

Former railway station in Derby, Derbyshire, England

Derby London Road

General information
- Location: Derby, Derbyshire; England

Other information
- Status: Disused

History
- Original company: Birmingham and Derby Junction Railway and Midland Counties Railway

Key dates
- 12 August 1839: Station opened
- 11 May 1840: Station closed and replaced by current station

Derby London Road railway station was a short-lived railway station that served the city of Derby in Derbyshire, England. It was situated on both the Birmingham and Derby Junction Railway lines from Derby to Birmingham Lawley Street and Hampton in Arden. As well as the Midland Counties Railway from Derby to Nottingham Carrington Street and Leicester.

== History ==
Derby London Road railway station was constructed by both the Birmingham and Derby Junction Railway and Midland Counties Railway as a terminus for services. These served the cities of Birmingham, Coventry, Leicester and Nottingham as well as the towns of Beeston, Burton on Trent, Coleshill, Fazeley, Long Eaton, Loughborough, Lutterworth, Rugby, Tamworth and Wigston. The Midland Counties Railway connected parts of the counties of Derbyshire, Leicestershire, Nottinghamshire, Staffordshire and Warwickshire.

The station was officially opened on the 12 August 1839, by the Birmingham and Derby Junction Railway intended as a temporary terminus for the line to Birmingham. The lines from Nottingham and Leicester also used the temporary station for the Derby branch line from Long Eaton.

== Location ==
The station was located where "London Road Junction" and "Melbourne Junction" converge near London Road bridge on the south side of the road bridge.

== Closure ==
The station was officially closed on the 11 May 1840, just under a year after it was constructed. The station was replaced by Derby railway station, then known as "Tri Junct Station" upon opening before becoming "Derby Midland" and then simply "Derby".

== Present day ==
Today, no physical remains exist of the station. Only a brief mention of the stations name remain in railway records.

Preceding station	Historical railways	Following station
Terminus	Midland Railway; Birmingham and Derby Junction Railway	Willington; Line open, station closed
Terminus	Midland Railway; Midland Counties Railway	Spondon; Line and station open
