= Birmingham and Derby Junction Railway Locomotives =

Birmingham and Derby Junction Railway Locomotives comprised twelve passenger locomotives (ordered 1838) and two goods locomotives (ordered 1841). When the Birmingham and Derby Junction Railway (B&DJR) amalgamated with the Midland Counties Railway and the North Midland Railway to form the Midland Railway (MR) in May 1844, the former B&DJR locomotives were given MR numbers; previously, they had been named, but not numbered. Most were renumbered in February 1847.

== Locomotive summary ==
=== Passenger ===
Wheel arrangement was 2-2-2. All had 12 inch by 18 inch cylinders and 5 foot 6 inch driving wheels. First to be delivered in 1839 were those from Mather Dixon, with 'Tamworth' being used for the inaugural run.

- Mather, Dixon and Company, Liverpool: 'Barton','Tamworth' and 'Hampton'.
- Charles Tayleur and Company, The Vulcan Foundry, Newton-le-Willows: 'Derby', 'Burton', 'Birmingham'.
- R and W Hawthorn Ltd, Newcastle upon Tyne: 'Anker','Tame', Blythe'
- Sharp, Roberts and Company, Manchester: 'Derwent, 'Trent', 'Dove'.

=== Goods ===
Wheel arrangement was 0-4-2. These had 5 foot driving wheels.

- Thompson & Cole, Little Bolton,: 'Kingsbury', 'Willington'.

== Stock list ==
Wheel Arr.	Maker	Serial No.	Name	Date	MR 1844 No.	MR 1847 No.	Withdrawn
2-2-2	Mather, Dixon		Barton	July 1839	39		(Note: These three were put to stationary use at some point between July 1845 and February 1847. The exact withdrawal dates are unknown.)
2-2-2	Mather, Dixon		Hampton	July 1839	50		
2-2-2	Mather, Dixon		Tamworth	July 1839	54		
2-2-2	Tayleur	75	Derby	July 1839	38	232	September 1851
2-2-2	Tayleur	76	Birmingham	July 1839	34	234	December 1851
2-2-2	Tayleur	77	Burton	July 1839	33	233	September 1851
2-2-2	Sharp, Roberts	51	Derwent	August 1839	36	236	March 1852
2-2-2	Sharp, Roberts	52	Dove	August 1839	37	237	April 1852
2-2-2	Sharp, Roberts	55	Trent	September 1839	35	235	February 1852
2-2-2	Hawthorn	262	Tame	November 1839	52	239	June 1852
2-2-2	Hawthorn	263	Blythe	November 1839	51	238	June 1852
2-2-2	Hawthorn	264	Anker	November 1839	53	240	August 1850
0-4-2	Thompson & Cole		Kingsbury	1841	77	298	April 1851
0-4-2	Thompson & Cole		Willington	1841	78	299 (Note: Renumbered 307, June 1852)	November 1852
