= Tamworth railway station =

Railway station in Staffordshire, England

Tamworth
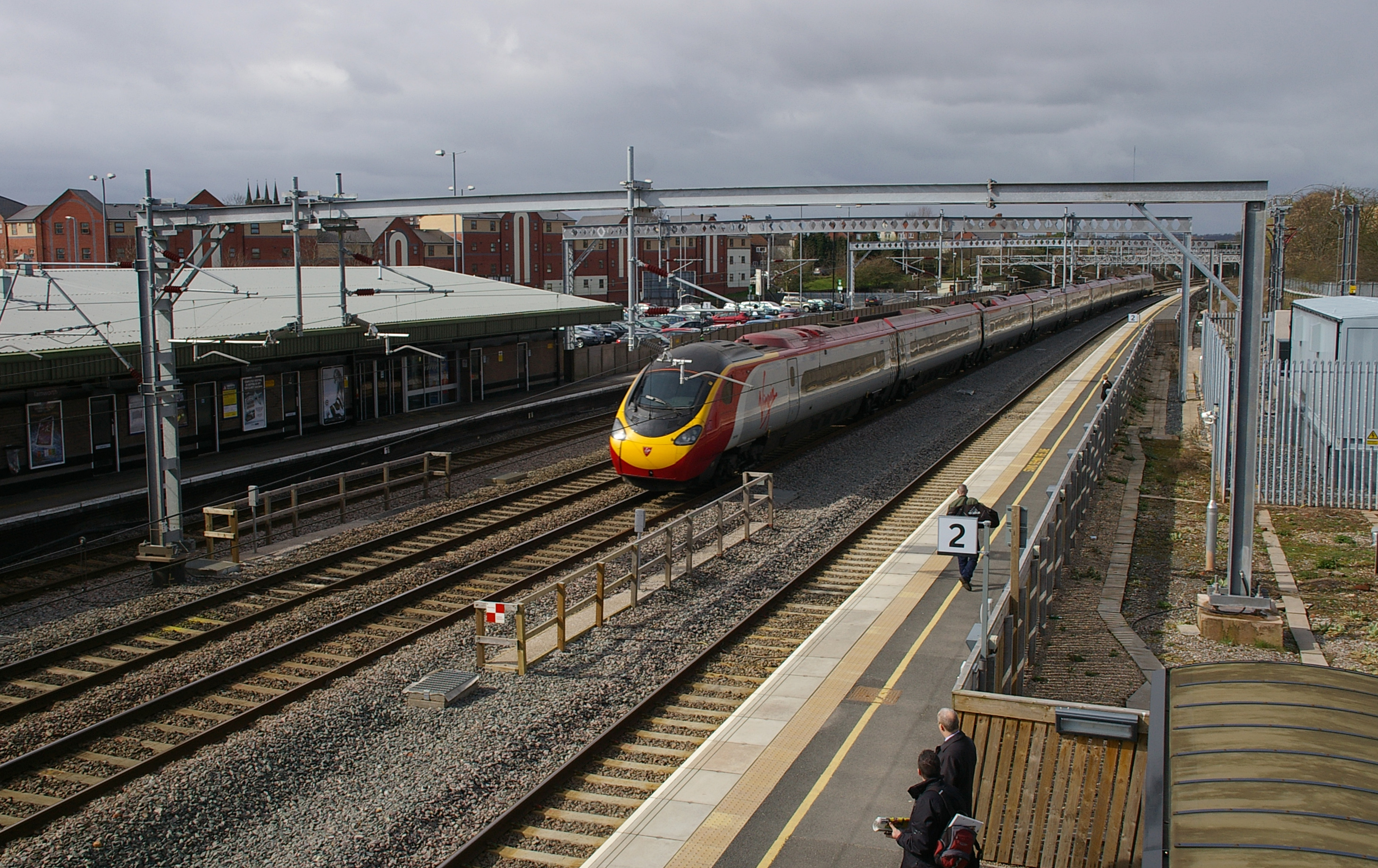
- Tamworth station, looking westbound on the West Coast Main Line

General information
- Location: Tamworth, Borough of Tamworth; England
- Coordinates: 52.6374°N 1.6869°W
- Grid reference: SK213044
- Manager: London Northwestern Railway
- Platforms: 4
- Tracks: 6

Other information
- Station code: TAM
- Classification: DfT category C2

History
- Opened: 12 August 1839
- Original company: Birmingham and Derby Junction Railway
- Pre-grouping: Midland Railway and London and North Western Railway
- Post-grouping: London, Midland and Scottish Railway

Key dates
- 1847: New joint station buildings erected
- 1909: Station jointly staffed by the MR and LNWR
- 1961: Station rebuilt

Passengers
- 2021/22: ▲0.834 million
- Interchange: ▲0.209 million
- 2022/23: ▲0.945 million
- Interchange: ▼0.203 million
- 2023/24: ▲1.030 million
- Interchange: ▲0.265 million
- 2024/25: ▲1.240 million
- Interchange: ▲0.359 million
- 2025/26: ▲1.396 million
- Interchange: ▲0.501 million
Location
Notes
- Passenger statistics from the Office of Rail and Road

Tamworth is a split-level railway station which serves the market town of Tamworth, in Staffordshire, England. It is an interchange between two main lines: the Cross Country Route and the Trent Valley section of the West Coast Main Line (WCML). It has four platforms: two low-level platforms (1 and 2) on the WCML and, crossing over these, two high-level platforms (3 and 4) served by the Cross Country Route. Historically, there were chords connecting the two lines, but there is no longer any rail connection between them.

== History ==
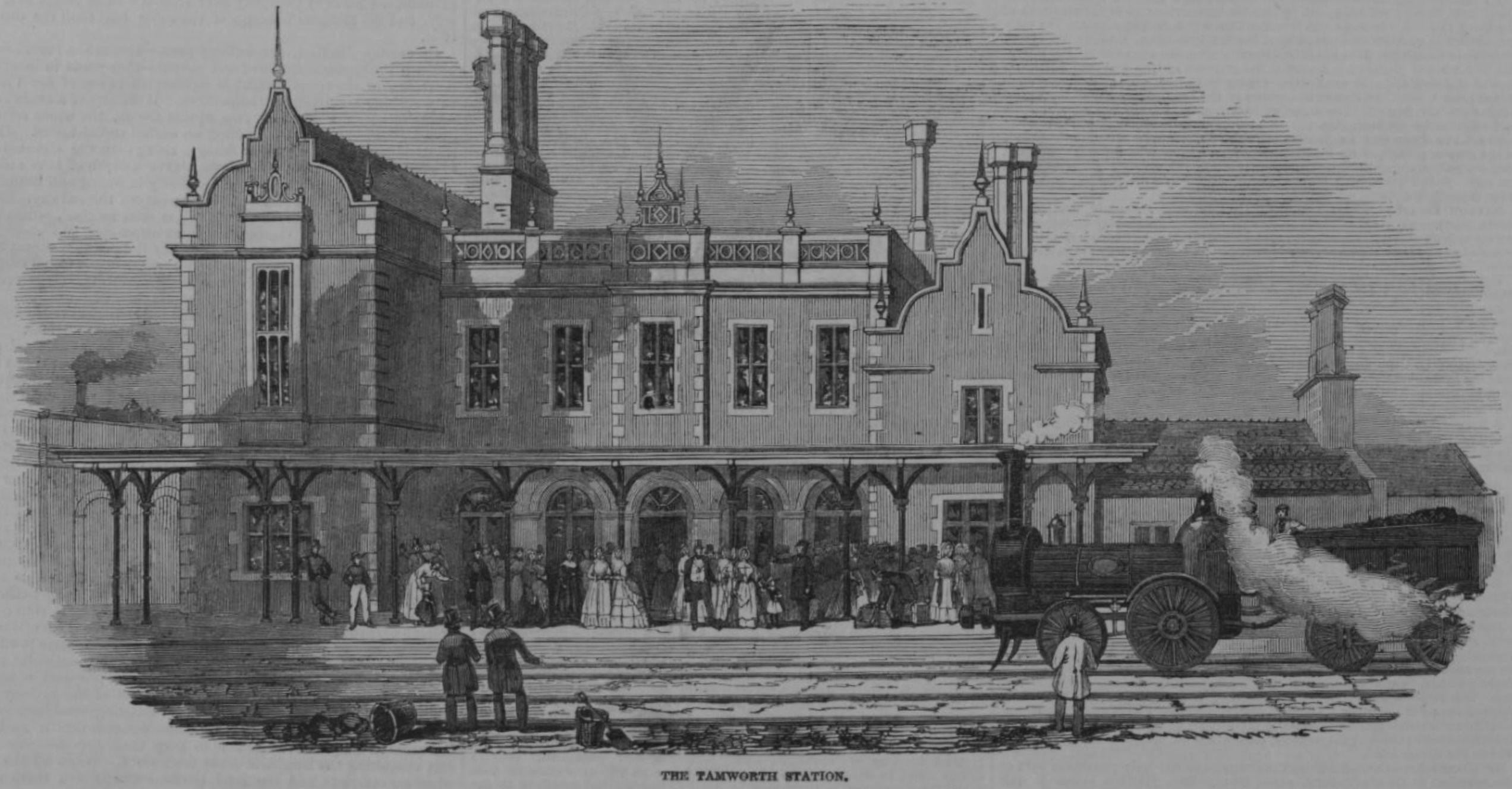
The main station building in 1847 (from the Illustrated London News, 4 December 1847)

The original station was opened on 12 August 1839 by the Birmingham and Derby Junction Railway, a forerunner of the Midland Railway, on its original route from Derby to Hampton-in-Arden meeting the London and Birmingham Railway for London. Later, in 1842, the B&DJ built a branch to Birmingham, terminating at Lawley Street railway station.

On 26 June 1847, the London and North Western Railway opened its Trent Valley line passing at a right angle beneath the original Birmingham and Derby line with a new joint station designed by John William Livock.

The joint station did not acquire the High Level and Low Level names until 1924. Since it was expected that only local trains would call, the low level platforms were on loops, with the running lines left clear for expresses. At that time, there was a north to west curve linking the, by then, Midland Railway line with the LNWR line. This curve was opened in 1847 and closed in March 1969.

A north to east curve was also constructed by the Midland Railway in around 1866 to carry LNWR Nuneaton-Burton traffic, but was never opened, as it had been made redundant by an agreement to build the Ashby and Nuneaton Joint Railway. Some sources state that the tracks were lifted in 1878, but certainly it was listed on maps as being dismantled by 1901.

Since Tamworth was the crossing of two major lines – one Bristol to Newcastle, the other Euston to Aberdeen – it was an important transfer station for the Royal Mail, with upwards of 2,000 bags of mail being transferred between the two lines every night by the 1950s. Mail lifts were provided between the low and high level lines to facilitate the transfer.

There was a large water tower and pumping station at the east end of the low level, pumping water from the River Anker below.

The original station was demolished in 1961 and a new station, built in functional style was designed by the architects for the London Midland Region of British Railways, Maurice Wheeler, E.G. Girdlestone and J.B. Sanders. The rebuilt station opened in 1962 and, at the same time, the Trent Valley Line was electrified, requiring the High level line and platforms to be raised by two feet.

=== Accidents and incidents ===
- On 14 September 1870, a mail train was diverted into a siding due to a signalman's error. It crashed through the buffers and ended up in the River Anker. Three people were killed.

== Layout ==
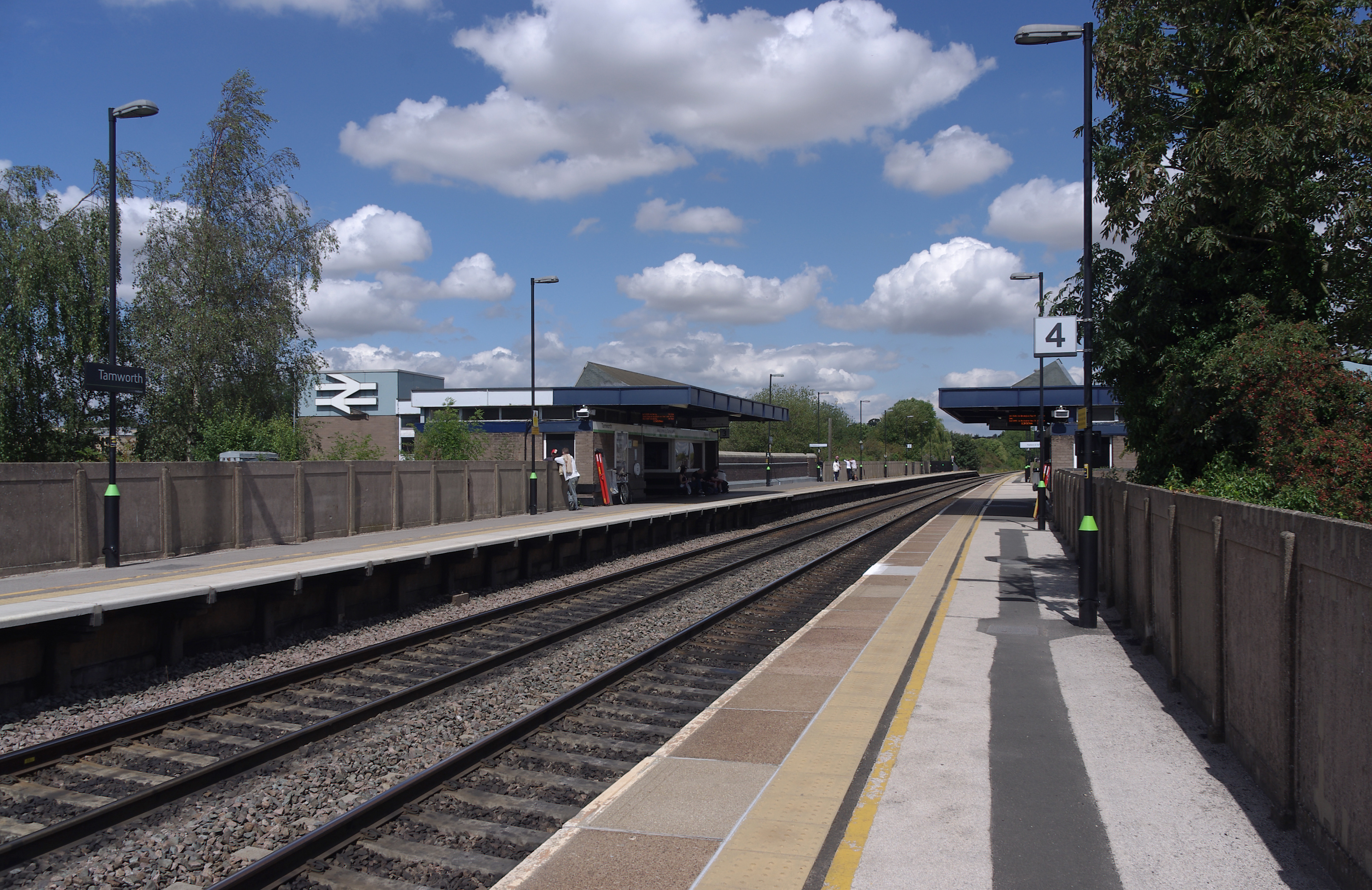
Tamworth high level platforms, looking north

There are four platforms.

On the low level (the West Coast Main Line):

- Platform 1 is a westbound platform for northward services towards North West England
- Platform 2 is an eastbound platform for southward services towards South East England

On the high level (on the Cross Country Route):

- Platform 3 is a northbound platform for services to the East Midlands, Yorkshire and Scotland;
- Platform 4 is a southbound platform for services to the West Midlands, South Wales and South West England.

== Facilities ==
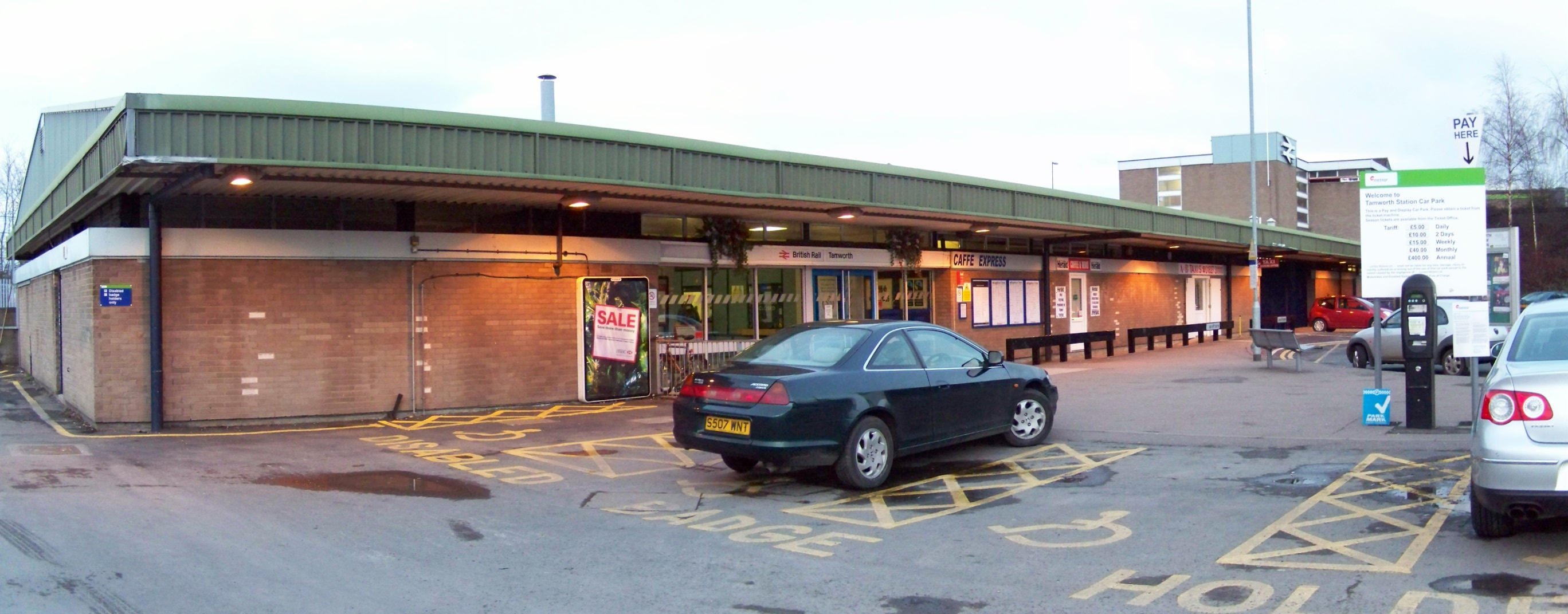
The main station building

The main buildings are adjacent to platform 1 and incorporate a ticket office (staffed seven days per week: 06:10 to 20:00 Mondays to Saturdays and 09:45 – 16:15 Sundays), customer service enquiry counter, photo booth, toilets, post box and a coffee shop. Two self-service ticket machines are sited on the station frontage for use when the ticket office is closed. Platform 2 only has a waiting shelter, whilst both high level platforms have waiting rooms. Train running information is provided via automatic announcements, CIS displays and timetable poster boards.

Both low-level platforms are directly linked with both high-level platforms by four staircases. All platforms are fully accessible for disabled passengers, as the two levels are also linked by three lifts. There is, however, no direct lift between platforms 2 and 3; step-free access between these platforms is only via platforms 1 and 4.

== Services ==
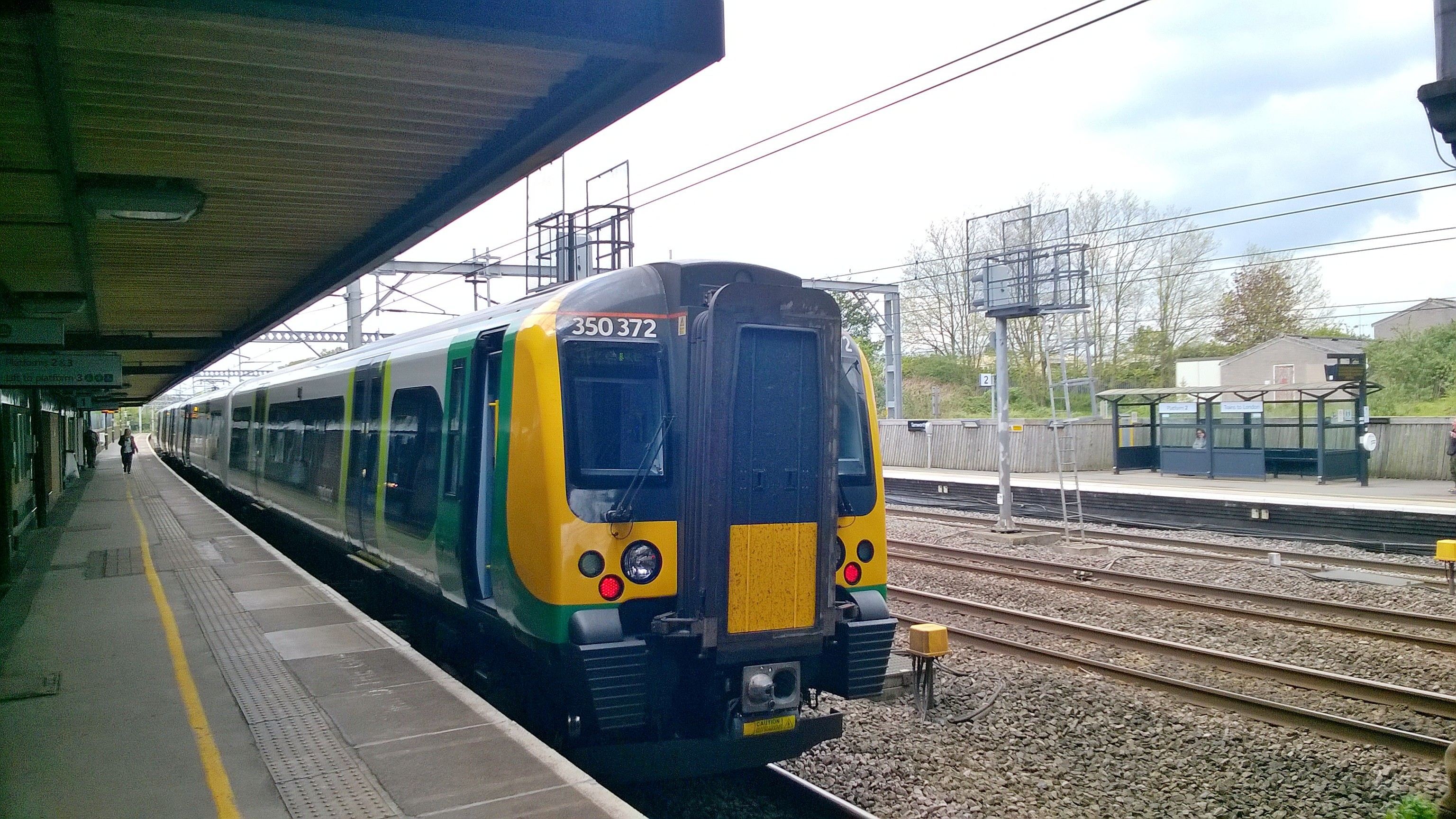
Class 350 Desiro electric multiple unit at the Low Level platforms

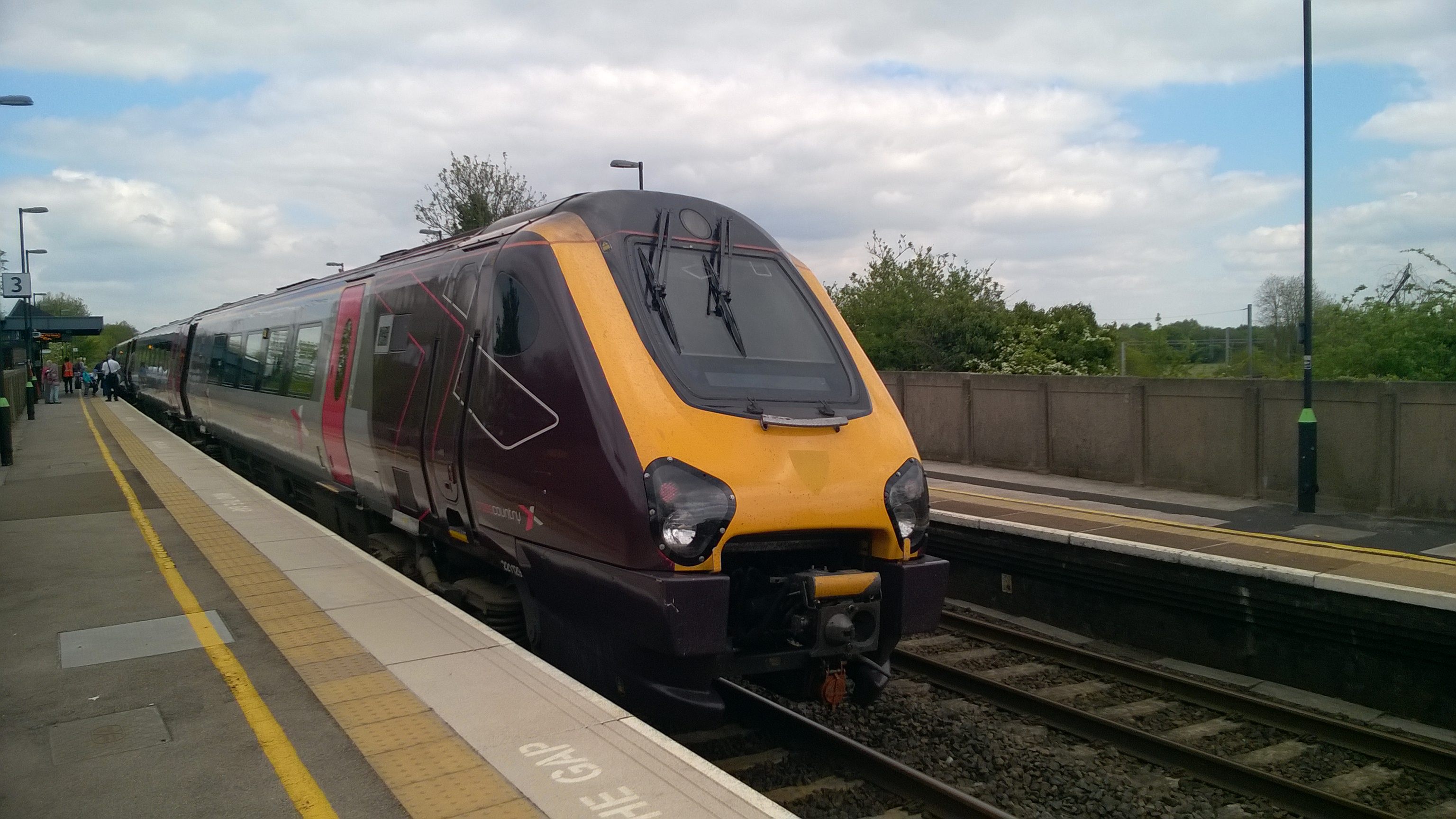
Class 221 Voyager diesel-electric multiple unit at the High Level platforms

The station is served by three train operating companies, with the following typical weekday services:

=== Avanti West Coast ===
- 1 train per hour (tph) to Liverpool Lime Street, via Runcorn
- 1 tph to London Euston.

=== CrossCountry ===
- 2 tph (trains per hour) to Nottingham, via Derby
- 1 tph to Birmingham New Street
- 1 tph to Cardiff Central, via Birmingham New Street and Gloucester
- 1 tp2h to Edinburgh Waverley, via Derby, Sheffield, Leeds, York and Newcastle; 1 tpd extends to Glasgow Central
- 1 tp2h to Plymouth, via Birmingham New Street, Bristol Temple Meads and Exeter St Davids; 1 tpd (train per day) extends to Penzance.

=== West Midlands Trains ===
Operating under the London Northwestern Railway branding, there are hourly semi-fast services in each direction between London Euston and Crewe, via Nuneaton, Rugby and Stafford. Some peak services call at Northampton.

| Preceding station | National Rail | Following station |
|---|---|---|
| Wilnecote | CrossCountry; Cardiff – Birmingham – Nottingham | Burton-on-Trent |
| Birmingham New Street | CrossCountry; Scotland and the North East to the South West and South Coast | Derby |
| Lichfield Trent Valley towards Crewe | London Northwestern Railway London–Crewe | Atherstone towards London Euston |
| Lichfield Trent Valley | Avanti West Coast Liverpool – London | Nuneaton |
| Lichfield Trent Valley | Avanti West Coast Liverpool – London | Milton Keynes Central |
| Lichfield Trent Valley | Avanti West Coast Liverpool – London | London Euston |
| Lichfield Trent Valley | Avanti West Coast Manchester – London | Milton Keynes Central |
| Lichfield Trent Valley | Avanti West Coast; North Wales – London | London Euston |
| Lichfield Trent Valley | Avanti West Coast; Lancaster/Preston – London | London Euston |
| | Historical railways | |
| Wilnecote; Line and station open | Midland Railway; Birmingham and Derby Junction Railway | Elford; Line open, station closed |
