= Wichnor Viaduct =

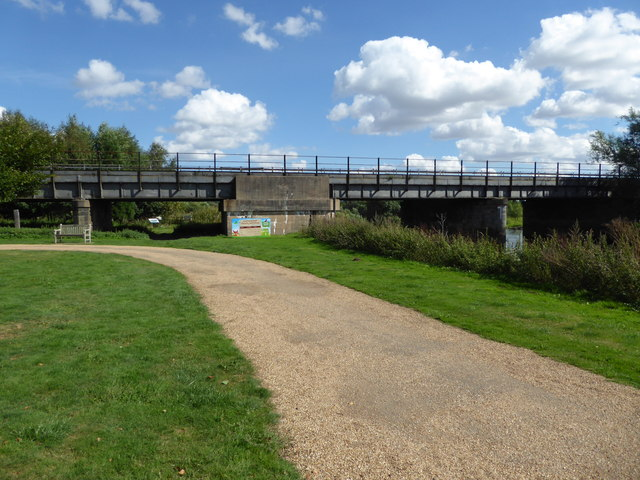
- A small section of the Wichnor Viaduct
- Coordinates: 52°43′53.71″N 1°43′10.13″W
- Carries: Cross Country Route
- Crosses: River Tame
- Locale: Wychnor, Staffordshire
- Official name: Wichnor Viaduct
- Other name(s): Croxall Viaduct
- Maintained by: Network Rail

Characteristics
- Total length: 1,310 ft (400 m)

History
- Opened: 1839

Wichnor Viaduct (formerly known as Croxall Viaduct) is a 1,310 feet (400 m) viaduct on the former Birmingham and Derby Junction Railway line near Wychnor, Staffordshire, England now part of the Cross Country Route.

== Construction ==
It was built in timber by the Birmingham and Derby Junction Railway as Croxall Viaduct to cross the River Trent and the River Tame at Wychnor, Staffordshire. There were 52 bays of 20 feet (6.1 m) span each. The contract was let in March 1838 and it was built in just over 1 year. Passenger services began on 12 August 1839.

The wooden viaduct was rebuilt in wrought iron in 1879.

In the 1930s, this was replaced with a steel construction by E.H. Darby, the London, Midland and Scottish Railway divisional engineer from Derby using 1,335 long tons (1,495 short tons) of new steel, with over 300 long tons (340 short tons) of steel from existing girders being re-used. A concrete plant and depot was installed at one end of the viaduct with temporary track laid to carry the concrete to the working points. 1,700 cubic yards (1,300 m^{3}) of concrete were laid for the floor, weighing approximately 2,900 long tons (3,200 short tons), and 4,000 cubic yards (3,100 m^{3}) of asphalt. Some 1.5 miles (2,400 m) of handrail tubing was installed. Work was undertaken between August 1931 and August 1932, 3 spans at a time on Sundays only to minimise disruption to rail traffic.
