= Bromford Bridge =

Bromford Bridge may refer to:

- The Bromford Viaduct, a viaduct in the Bromford area of Birmingham, England, which carries the M6 motorway
- Bromford Bridge railway station, defunct railway station in Birmingham
- Bromford Bridge Racecourse, former racecourse in Birmingham
