= Castle Bromwich railway station =

Disused railway station in England

Castle Bromwich
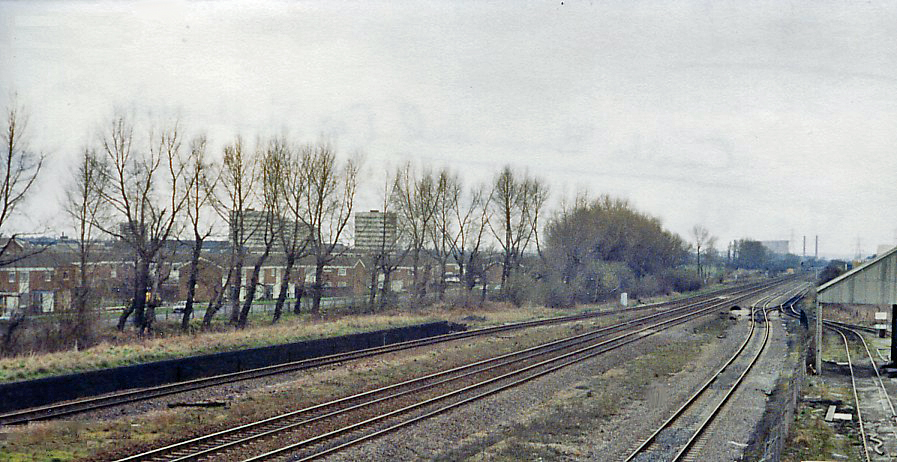
- Station platform remains in April 1984

General information
- Location: Castle Bromwich, Solihull; England
- Coordinates: 52.5117°N 1.7962°W
- Grid reference: SP139904
- Platforms: 4

Other information
- Status: Disused

History
- Original company: Birmingham and Derby Junction Railway
- Pre-grouping: Midland Railway
- Post-grouping: London, Midland and Scottish Railway

Key dates
- 10 February 1842: Station opened
- 4 March 1968: Station closed
Location

Lines around Whitacre Junction

Castle Bromwich railway station was a railway station in the Castle Bromwich area of Solihull opened by the Birmingham and Derby Junction Railway in 1842.

It was on the line into Birmingham Lawley Street from Water Orton.

Regular passenger services finished in 1968 but afterwards occasional excursions served the station for a few years but unknown when these ceased.

Plans were made to reopen this station, with an estimated date of 2027. However, this project has been put on hold indefinitely in July 2024 due to lack of funding.

== Services ==
Preceding station	Disused railways	Following station
Water Orton	Midland Railway; Birmingham to Peterborough Line	Bromford Bridge
