= Croxall railway station =

Former railway station in England

Croxall
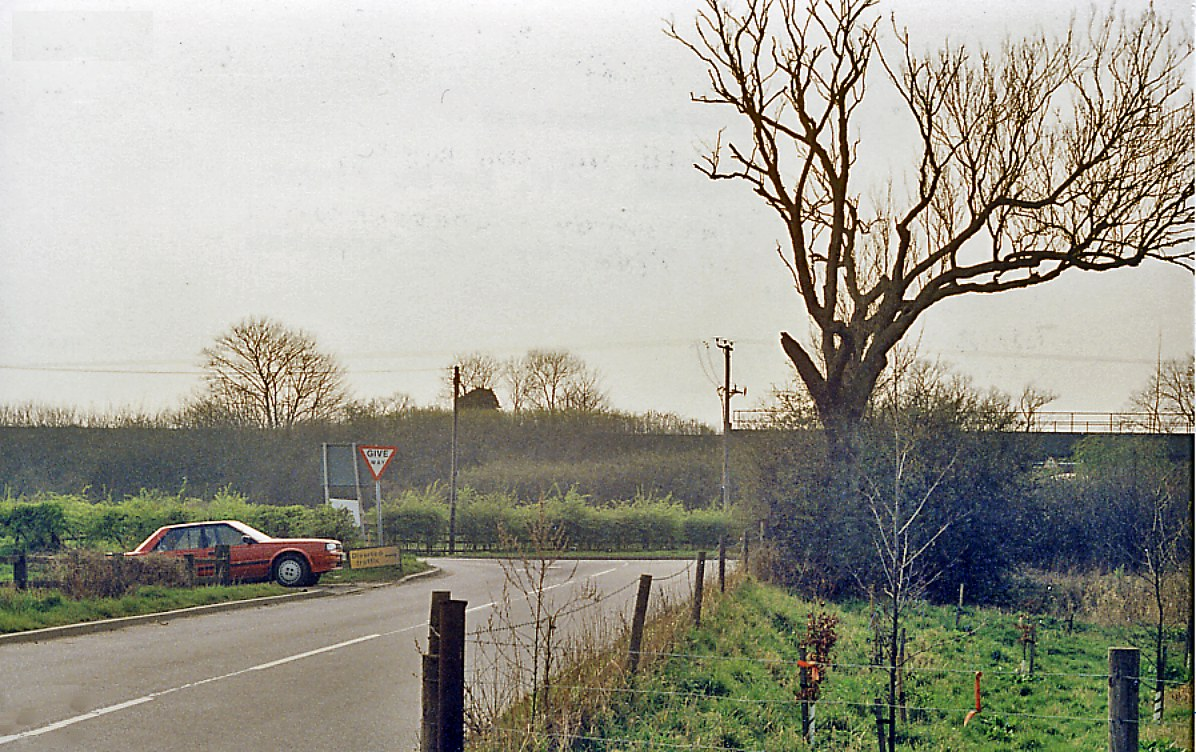
- Site of the station in 1989

General information
- Location: Croxall, Lichfield; England
- Coordinates: 52.7215°N 1.7191°W
- Grid reference: SK190137
- Platforms: 2

Other information
- Status: Disused

History
- Original company: Birmingham and Derby Junction Railway
- Pre-grouping: Midland Railway
- Post-grouping: London, Midland and Scottish Railway

Key dates
- 15 June 1840: Station opens as Oakley and Alrewas
- 1 November 1849: renamed Oakley
- 1 December 1856: renamed Croxall
- 9 July 1928: Station closes to regular passenger traffic
Location

Croxall railway station was a railway station serving the village of Croxall in Staffordshire between Tamworth and Burton upon Trent

== History ==
It was opened in 1840 by the Birmingham and Derby Junction Railway, one year after the line opened.

It was called Oakley and Alrewas at first, changing to Oakley in 1849, then Croxall in 1856. From 8 April 1878 the staff at Wichnor Junction were placed under the supervision of Croxall station.

It closed to regular passengers in 1928. In 1929 as a consequence of the Birmingham Anglers’ Association being granted a five year lease of the fishing rights in the River Tame in 1929, the L.M.S. Railway company arranged for a Sunday service from Birmingham at 7.15am to call at Croxall, with a return from Croxall provided at 8.50pm. In 1930 the rateable value of the station was reduced to £1 whilst it was used for fishermens' excursions and the excursions were still be advertised in 1932.

Another station named Oakley was opened in 1857 by the Midland Railway on its extension from Leicester to Bedford and Hitchin. This closed in 1958.

== Stationmasters ==
- William Keeling ca. 1851
- Edward Eagle ca. 1860 - 1865 (afterwards station master at Sandiacre)
- J. Finlayson from 1865
- James Bott ca. 1868
- J. Jacques until 1878 (afterwards station master at Whissendine)
- G.R. Cooper 1878 - 1881 (formerly station master at Wychnor Junction, afterwards station master at Grimston)
- Thomas Clay 1881 - 1905 (formerly station master at Blackwell)
- Frederick Swain 1905 - 1908 (afterwards station master at Elford)
- Harry Winmill 1908 - ca. 1914

== Route ==
Preceding station	Disused railways	Following station
Elford; Line and station closed	Midland Railway; Derby to Birmingham route	Wichnor Junction; Line and station closed
