= Wilnecote railway station =

Railway station in Staffordshire, England

Coordinates: 52.611°N 1.679°W

Wilnecote
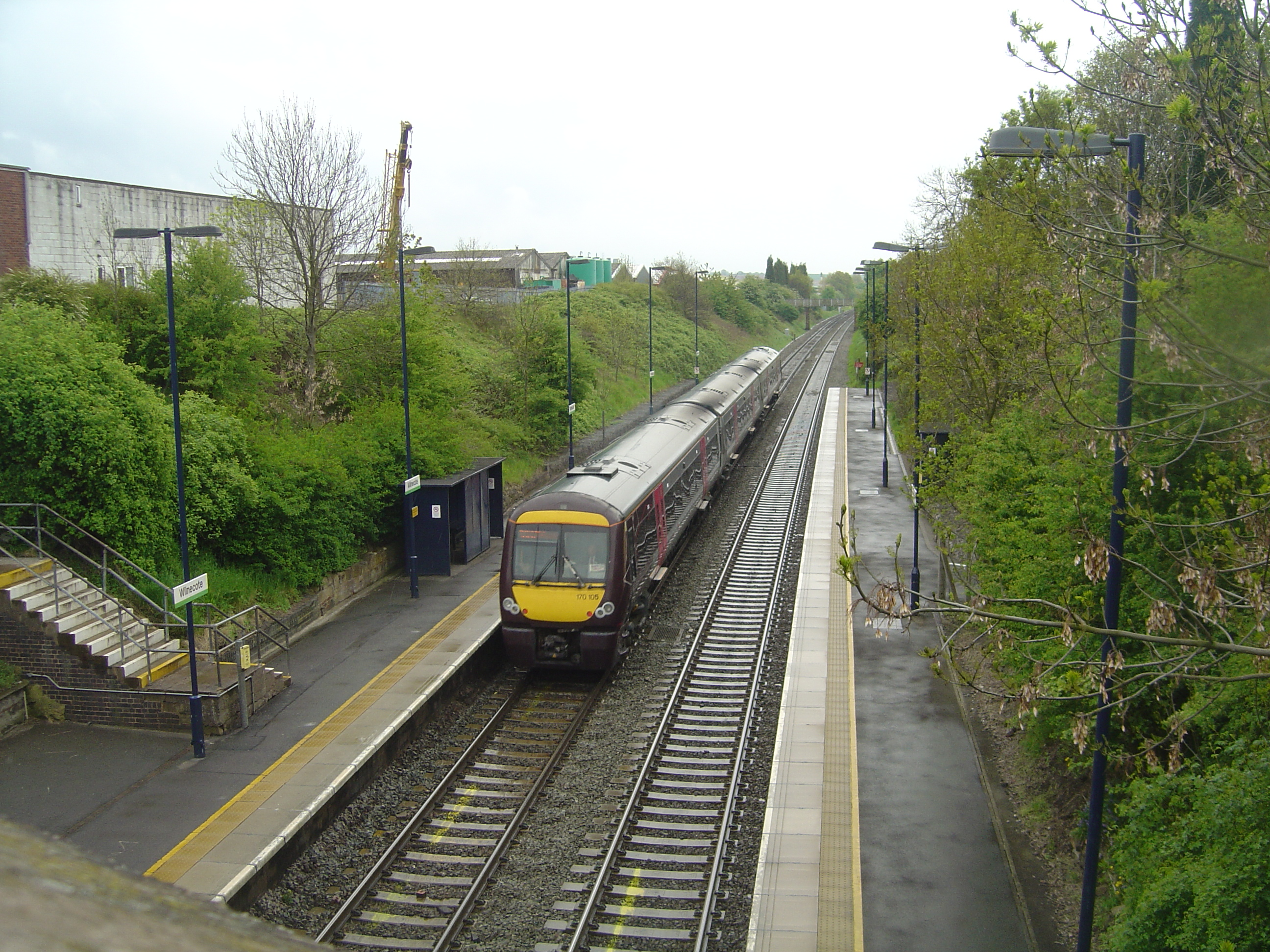

General information
- Location: Wilnecote, Tamworth; England
- Grid reference: SK217014
- Manager: West Midlands Railway
- Platforms: 2

Other information
- Station code: WNE
- Classification: DfT category F2

Key dates
- 1842: Opened as Wilnecote and Fazeley
- 1904: Renamed as Wilnecote

Passengers
- 2021/22: ▲59,966
- 2022/23: ▲74,728
- 2023/24: ▲80,390
- 2024/25: ▲98,734
- 2025/26: ▲0.103 million
Location
Notes
- Passenger statistics from the Office of Rail and Road

Wilnecote railway station is a railway station serving the town of Fazeley and suburb of Wilnecote in Staffordshire, England. It is 1.5 miles (2 km) south of Tamworth town centre. The station is situated beneath a bridge which carries the former A5 Watling Street.

== History ==
It was opened in 1842 by the Birmingham and Derby Junction Railway as Wilnecote and Fazeley, the name being shortened in 1904 to just Wilnecote.

In 1889, John William Leader, a corn merchant of Tamworth was killed at the station when crossing the tracks he was struck by an express from Derby.

=== Stationmasters ===
In 1961 Brian A. Martin was appointed station master a few months after his twentieth birthday and was at the time the youngest station master on British Railways.

- Joseph Passey ca. 1851 – 1860
- William Hunt 1860–1879
- G. Hull 1879
- A. Withers 1879–1880
- William Headford 1880–1888 (formerly station master at Great Glen)
- George E. Cookson 1888–1899 (formerly station master at Finedon)
- Samuel Allanach 1900–1906 (afterwards station master at West Bridge, Leicester)
- Henry Molineux 1906–1908
- George Parker 1908–1931
- Percy Jackson 1931–1932 (formerly station master at Church Gresley)
- Walter J. Crisp 1932–1933
- Noel Manton 1933–1940 (formerly station master at Borrowash, afterwards station master at Oakham)
- F.A. Brown from 1940
- Brian A. Martin from 1961

== Services ==
Wilnecote is served by hourly CrossCountry services southbound to Cardiff Central via Birmingham New Street, Cheltenham Spa, Gloucester and Newport and northbound Nottingham via Derby, the first two trains of the day to each of Cardiff and Nottingham start from New Street. One train per day on Mondays to Saturdays from Nottingham also calls at Water Orton after Wilnecote. West Midlands Trains manage the station but do not provide any train services here.

Preceding station	National Rail	Following station
Birmingham New Street	CrossCountry Cardiff – Birmingham – Nottingham	Tamworth
