= Bromford Bridge railway station =

Disused railway station in England

Bromford Bridge
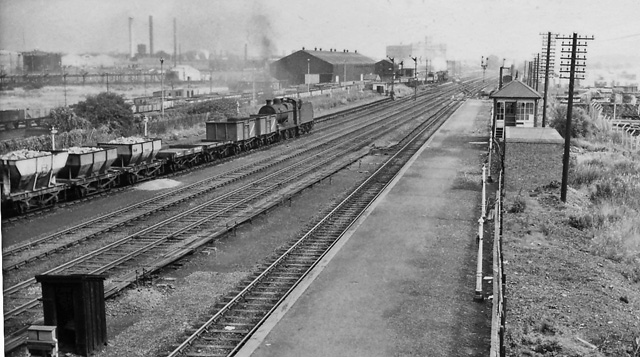
- Bromford Bridge station in September 1962

General information
- Location: Bromford, Birmingham; England
- Coordinates: 52.5053°N 1.8299°W
- Grid reference: SP116897
- Platforms: 2

Other information
- Status: Disused

History
- Original company: Midland Railway
- Pre-grouping: Midland Railway
- Post-grouping: London, Midland and Scottish Railway

Key dates
- 16 May 1842: Station opened as Bromford Forge
- 1 June 1843: Station closed
- 9 March 1896: Station rebuilt and renamed Bromford Bridge Racecourse
- 28 June 1965: Station closed
Location

Bromford Bridge railway station was a railway station in Birmingham opened by the Midland Railway in 1896.

It was built on the site of the previous Bromford Forge railway station which had been opened by the Birmingham and Derby Junction Railway on its new line to Lawley Street railway station in 1842.

It was on the line from Water Orton and was reopened in 1896, the line by then being connected to Birmingham New Street. It was only used to serve the nearby racecourse, the platforms being on the goods lines to which the "specials" could be brought, clear of the running lines.

It closed in 1965 when the racecourse closed.

The name "Bromford Bridge" comes from the bridge over the River Tame, before which the river was crossed by a ford, hence "Bromford". The original station, Bromford Forge, was on the same level as the road, which crossed the railway on the level. At that time the track was just double. It was quadrupled later. As traffic increased, the level crossing became inconvenient, so the long viaduct was built, carrying Bromford Lane over the railway. Remains of the original road are still visible when looking down from Bromford Lane. The south platform was originally an island, with tracks on both sides. In the photograph above you can see where the additional tracks used to be. The signalbox was not sited there at the time. Beyond that platform was a terminal platform for unloading horses, with an entrance directly into the racecourse. It was used only for horses and dignitaries: the public had no access. On at least one occasion the Royal Train was backed into the platform. On the other side of Bromford Lane to the station there was a public footpath alongside the railway, which led to the Metropolitan Cammell factory.
