= Thompson & Cole =

- Industry: Engineering
- Founded: c.1833
- Founder: Thomas Thompson and Joseph Cole
- Headquarters: Little Bolton, England
- Products: Steam locomotives and stationary engines

Thompson & Cole was a Locomotive manufacturer at Hope Foundry, St George's Street, Little Bolton, England.

The history of the company included Thomas Thompson, William Swift and Joseph Cole, all of whom were promoters of the Bolton and Leigh Railway. In the early 1800s, the company was called Thompson and Swift, ironfounders. Around 1828, the name changed to Thompson, Swift and Cole. About 1833, the name changed again to Thompson and Cole. Finally, the name changed to W. and J. Cole. W. Cole was probably William Cole, born 1817, the son of Joseph Cole.

The company produced five steam locomotives around 1840 and 1841, two of them for the Birmingham and Derby Junction Railway. Stationary steam engines were also built including, in 1845, a beam engine for Thomas Appleton and Company of Horrabin Mills, Turton, Lancashire.
