= Maxstoke railway station =

Closed railway station in Warwickshire, England

Maxstoke
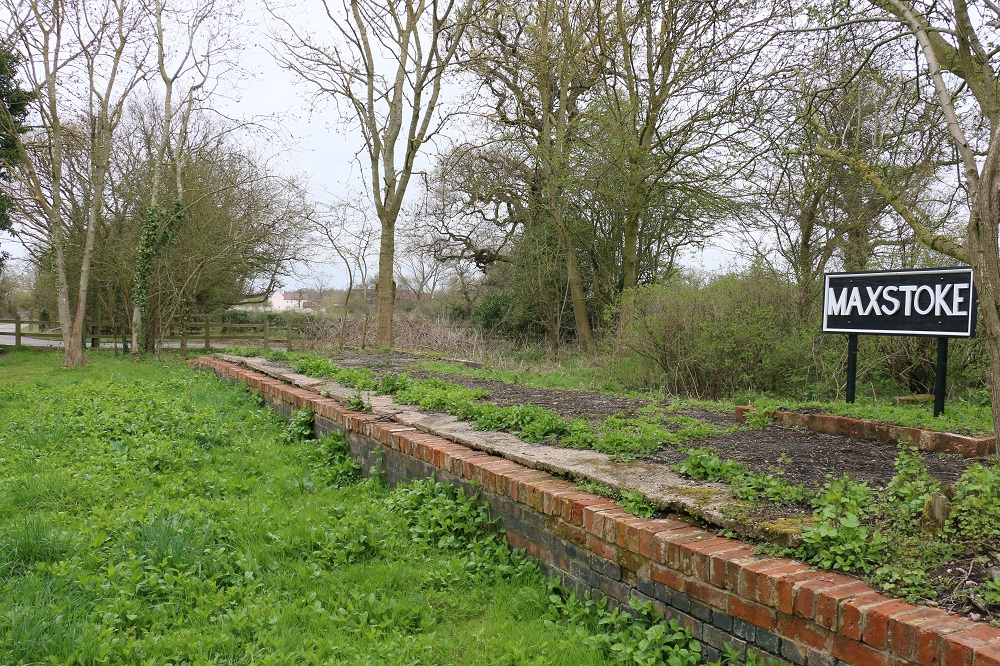
- Maxstoke station platform April 2015

General information
- Other names: Coleshill
- Location: England
- Coordinates: 52.4940°N 1.6884°W

Other information
- Status: Disused

History
- Original company: Birmingham and Derby Junction Railway
- Pre-grouping: Midland Railway
- Post-grouping: London, Midland and Scottish Railway

Key dates
- 1839: Station opens as Coleshill
- 1 January 1917: Closed to passenger traffic
- 1923: Renamed Maxstoke
- 30 April 1939: Station closes
Location

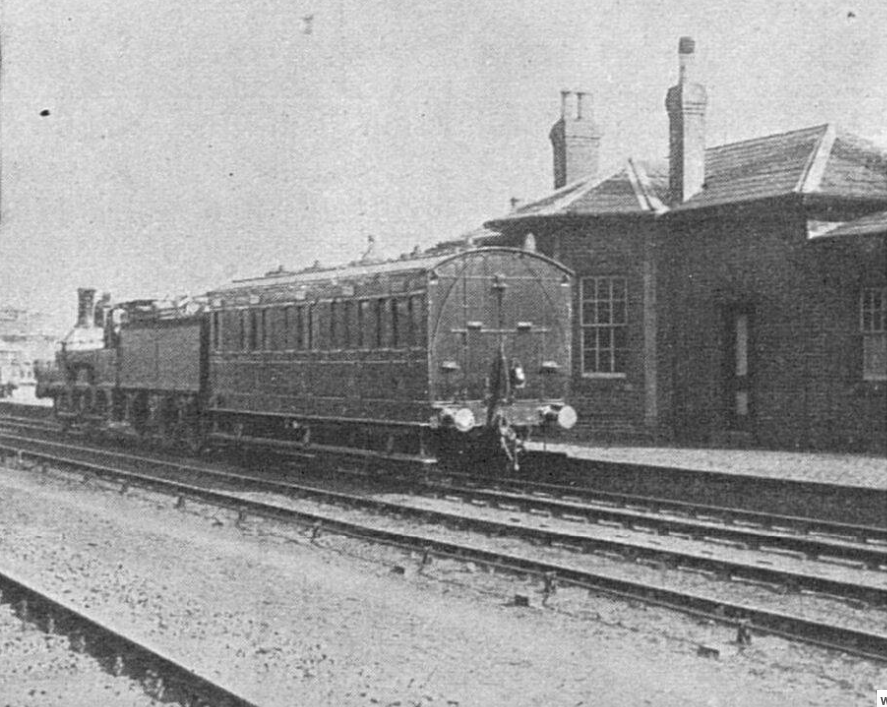
Coleshill (later Maxstoke) railway station from The Sketch 28 August 1907

Maxstoke railway station was a railway station opened in 1839 as Coleshill by the Birmingham and Derby Junction Railway on its original route from Derby to Hampton-in-Arden meeting the London and Birmingham Railway for London. The station served the village of Maxstoke and town of Coleshill in Warwickshire, England.

Lines around Whitacre Junction

== History ==
When the BD&JR built its alternative route in Lawley Street in 1842, the line, known as the Stonebridge Railway, lost its importance and the passenger service finished in 1917.

It was renamed Maxstoke in 1923 (while Forge Mills became Coleshill)

Freight services continued until 30 April 1939. The track was removed soon after and the station was demolished.

On 24 February 2014, a local volunteer from Birmingham, with the full permission of a local farmer, began uncovering the platform fascia and brickwork.

== Stationmasters ==
- P. Gibson ca. 1859, ca. 1866
- Frederick Freeman
- William Barber ca. 1868
- F. Turner until 1873
- F. Swinnerton 1873 - 1877
- William Reynolds 1877 - 1887 (formerly station master at Hellifield)
- Charles Wells 1887 - 1908
- William L. Leary 1908 - ca. 1912
