= Hams Hall =

Industrial estate in Warwickshire, England

Coordinates: 52.525°N 1.708°W

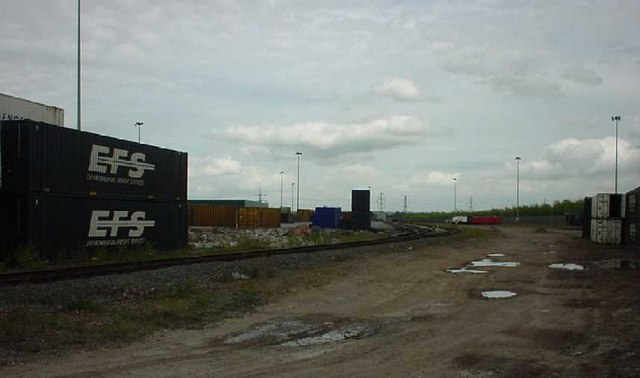
Hams Hall Rail Freight Terminal - geograph.org.uk - 2337896

Hams Hall is a place near Lea Marston in North Warwickshire, England, named after the former Hams Hall manor house. A power station at Hams Hall was constructed and operated in the late 1920s; a further two power stations began generating electricity in the 1940s and 1950s. By 1993 all three power stations had been closed and demolished and an industrial park, Hams Hall Distribution Park, was built. An intermodal rail terminal, Hams Hall Rail Freight Terminal, also operates at the site.

== Hams Hall Estate ==
The Hams Hall Estate and what is modern day Saltley was owned by the Adderley family for over 262 years. The name of the estate was derived from the fact that the land lay in a great hook (ham) of the River Tame.

As Birmingham and the Black Country developed, the estate faced two problems: loss of land to the west, and lack of water from the river due to industrial pollution. Thus, after Robert Rawlinson's report on the condition of Birmingham in 1848 suggesting the need for a public park, Charles Adderley, 1st Baron Norton donated 8 acres (0.032 km^{2}) of land to create Adderley Park, which he managed privately from 1855 to 1864. He also donated land for the construction of St Saviour's Church, St Peter's College, Saltley and the reformatory on the Fordrough, later called Norton Boys' Home. In 1879 Lord Norton sold Whitacre Lodge to the city for the construction of the 80 acres (0.32 km^{2}) Shustoke Reservoir, the largest single source of water for Birmingham until the Elan/Claerwen scheme was completed.

Following the death of Charles Adderley in 1905, the residual estate was put up for sale in 1911 to pay death duties. Initially purchased by an American shipping magnate, he dismantled the house in 1921. It was reassembled as Bledisloe Lodge, a hall of residence for students at the Royal Agricultural College, Cirencester at Coates, Gloucestershire.

== Hams Hall Power Station ==
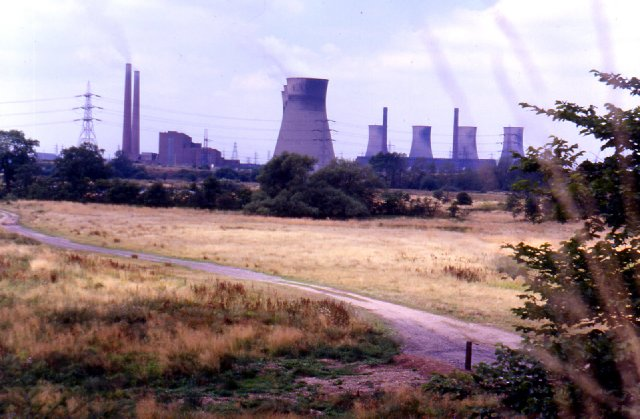
Hams Hall Power Station, 1984

The City of Birmingham bought land at Hams Hall, and built an electricity generating station (Hams Hall A), from 1928. Located north of Coleshill Parkway railway station, the location allowed easy access for coal supply trains from the London, Midland and Scottish Railway mainline. Built under the direction of Richard Alexander Chattock (1865–1936), Birmingham City Electrical Engineer.

Two more stations (Hams Hall B and C) were later built on the site, reputedly the largest in Europe at the time of their construction. The city's electricity generating and supply functions were nationalised in the late 1940s.

The Central Electricity Generating Board took over responsibility for the site from Birmingham and founded an environmental studies centre, re-erecting Lea Ford Cottage (a local medieval timber-framed building) there to preserve it. Still owned by site owner E.ON, it is now known as Hams Hall Environmental Studies Centre. The area alongside the confluence of the River Blythe and River Tame became the West Midland Bird Club's Ladywalk Reserve.

All three stations were closed and demolished in the 1990s. The land was cleared, on which was built Hams Hall Distribution Park, with only electrical sub-stations remaining.

== Hams Hall Distribution Park ==
After the Hams Hall Power station site was cleared, Powergen accepted various European Union and central government grants to allow a consortium of construction companies including Alfred McAlpine to construct a new industrial estate called Hams Hall Distribution Park,

The 430 acres (1.7 km^{2}) site includes road (M42) and rail access (through the Hams Hall Rail Freight Terminal).

In 2011 the site housed clients including E.ON, Sainsbury's, BMW (engine manufacturing plant), DHL, ABB, Chubb, Beko, Exel and Wincanton.

=== Hams Hall Rail Freight Terminal ===
The Hams Hall Channel Tunnel Freight Terminal was opened 11 July 1997 by the then deputy prime minister John Prescott. As of 2010 the site was one of the main international intermodal terminals in the UK.

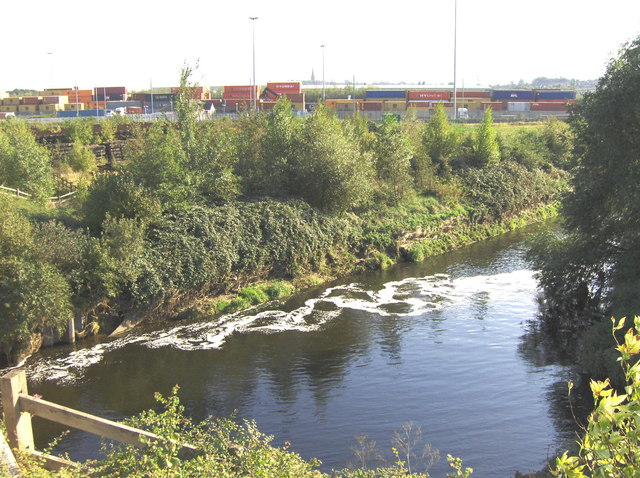
View of the freight terminal at Hams Hall, 2008

The site was originally operated by Parsec Europe Ltd.; in 2002 Associated British Ports acquired the site lease.

The 11 acres (0.045 km^{2}) terminal is sited on the southern edge of Hams Hall business park; since 2004 it has had customs clearance to handle international traffic via the Channel Tunnel; the site has storage for 6,000 TEU, and rail access is cleared to W10 vehicle gauge. There are also regular daily flows from Felixstowe. The area around Nuneaton and the Midlands has been referred to as the "Golden Triangle of Logistics". Hams Hall Rail Freight Terminal is in this Golden Triangle and one of the busiest intermodal terminals.

== See also ==
- Coleshill Parkway railway station opened 2007 close to the rail freight terminal, south of the main distribution park
