= Elford railway station =

Former railway station in England

Elford

General information
- Location: Elford, Lichfield; England
- Coordinates: 52.6959°N 1.7058°W
- Grid reference: SK199109
- Platforms: 2

Other information
- Status: Disused

History
- Original company: Midland Railway
- Pre-grouping: Midland Railway
- Post-grouping: London, Midland and Scottish Railway

Key dates
- 1 July 1850: Station opens as Haselour
- 1 November 1855: renamed Haselour and Elford
- 1 September 1864: renamed Elford and Haselour
- 1 April 1904: renamed Haselour
- 5 May 1914: renamed Elford
- 31 March 1952: Station closes
Location

Elford railway station was a railway station serving the village of Elford and the manor of Haselour Hall in Staffordshire.

== History ==
It was opened by the Midland Railway in 1850.

It was between Tamworth and Burton upon Trent on the line originally built by the Birmingham and Derby Junction Railway.

Originally, it was called Haselour and later either Elford and Haselour or Haselour and Elford.

It had two platforms on either side of the double track with conventional Midland buildings.

By 1951 the station was running at a loss of £400 per year (equivalent to £10,500 in 2023). Elford with a population of 500 only resulted in 5 people taking the train each day. It was reported that takings were not sufficient to cover a porter's wages. Due to subsidence on the main line, if it were to be retained, the main line would need raising and the buildings would need to be demolished at a cost of more than £2,000. (equivalent to £52,300 in 2023).

Despite a petition signed by over 100 residents it closed on 31 March 1952 but reopened for transporting goods in 1954 through 1973.

== Stationmasters ==
- Robert F. Sharpe ca. 1859 - 1891
- James Collins 1891 - 1895 (formerly station master at Branston, afterwards station master at Barton and Walton)
- Zachary Gilbert 1895 - 1902 (afterwards station master at Aldridge)
- W. Beasley 1902 - 1908 (formerly station master at Aldridge)
- Frederick Swain 1908 - 1914 (formerly station master at Croxall, afterwards station master at Desford)
- H. Salt from 1914
- John Molineux 1922 - 1940
- C.C. Clarke 1941 - 1943 (afterwards station master at Borrowash)
- J. Redmond 1943

== Route ==
Preceding station	Disused railways	Following station
Tamworth; Line and station closed	Midland Railway; Derby to Birmingham route	Croxall; Line and station closed
