= Water Orton railway station =

Railway station in Water Orton, Warwickshire, England

Water Orton
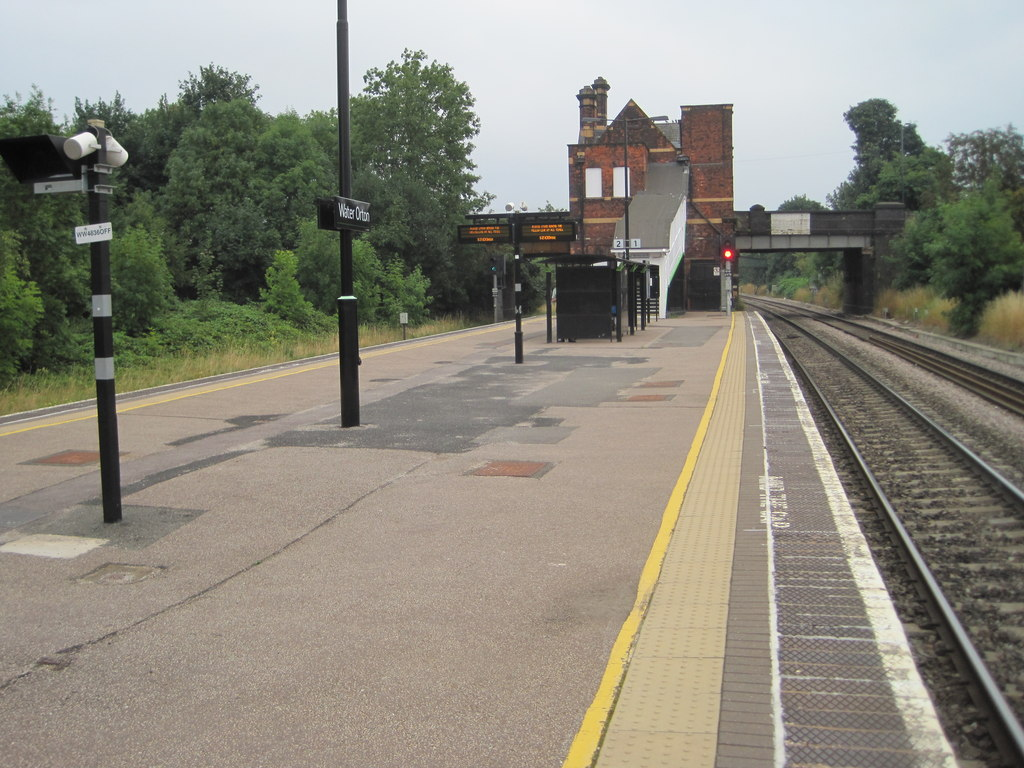
- The station in August 2013.

General information
- Location: Water Orton, North Warwickshire; England
- Coordinates: 52.518611°N 1.743889°W
- Grid reference: SP174912
- Manager: West Midlands Railway
- Platforms: 2
- Tracks: 3

Other information
- Station code: WTO
- Classification: DfT category F2

Key dates
- 10 February 1842: first station opened
- 1908: resited

Passengers
- 2021/22: ▲25,812
- 2022/23: ▲39,384
- 2023/24: ▲43,444
- 2024/25: ▲46,796
- 2025/26: ▲56,474
Location
Notes
- Passenger statistics from the Office of Rail and Road

Lines around Whitacre Junction

Water Orton railway station serves the village of Water Orton in Warwickshire, England. It is owned by Network Rail, and managed by West Midlands Railway. However, no West Midlands Trains stop there; it is only served by CrossCountry services.

== History ==
It was first opened in 1842 by the Birmingham and Derby Junction Railway on its line into Birmingham Lawley Street from Whitacre Junction.

However the Midland Railway built a cutoff line from slightly further west to a junction at Kingsbury between 1908 and 1909. The station was resited in August 1908. Although the distance saved was only a mile-and-a-quarter, the junctions at Water Orton and Kingsbury could be taken at a much higher speed than the original one at Whitacre. The line from Whitacre to Kingsbury is used by only a few trains a week.

== Facilities ==
The station is unstaffed and has no ticketing facilities, so passengers requiring a ticket must purchase one in advance or from the conductor on the train.

== Platform layout ==
The station is known to be a bottleneck for many CrossCountry services, with stopping Leicester to Birmingham, all Birmingham to Leicester and services from the North east to Birmingham all using one platform. However, resolving this is not easy and proposals have been put forward to build a new station at Water Orton to relieve capacity constraints through the station.

Platform 1 is used for stopping trains to Leicester and Birmingham, whilst platform 2 is used for trains towards Derby, of which only one calls per day.

== Services ==
CrossCountry serves the station with services every two hours off-peak westbound to Birmingham New Street and eastbound to Leicester, with 1tph in each direction in the peaks. The last train to New Street of the day departs at 16:02.

There is generally one train a day Monday-Friday evenings to Nottingham via Derby and Tamworth. There is no Sunday service.

Preceding station	National Rail	Following station
Birmingham New Street	CrossCountry Birmingham – Leicester – Stansted Airport Mondays–Saturdays only	Coleshill Parkway
Birmingham New Street	CrossCountry Cardiff – Birmingham – Nottingham Mondays–Fridays only	Wilnecote
	Historical railways	
Castle Bromwich	Midland Railway; Birmingham–Peterborough line	Forge Mills
