= Birmingham and Derby Junction Railway =

Former British railway company

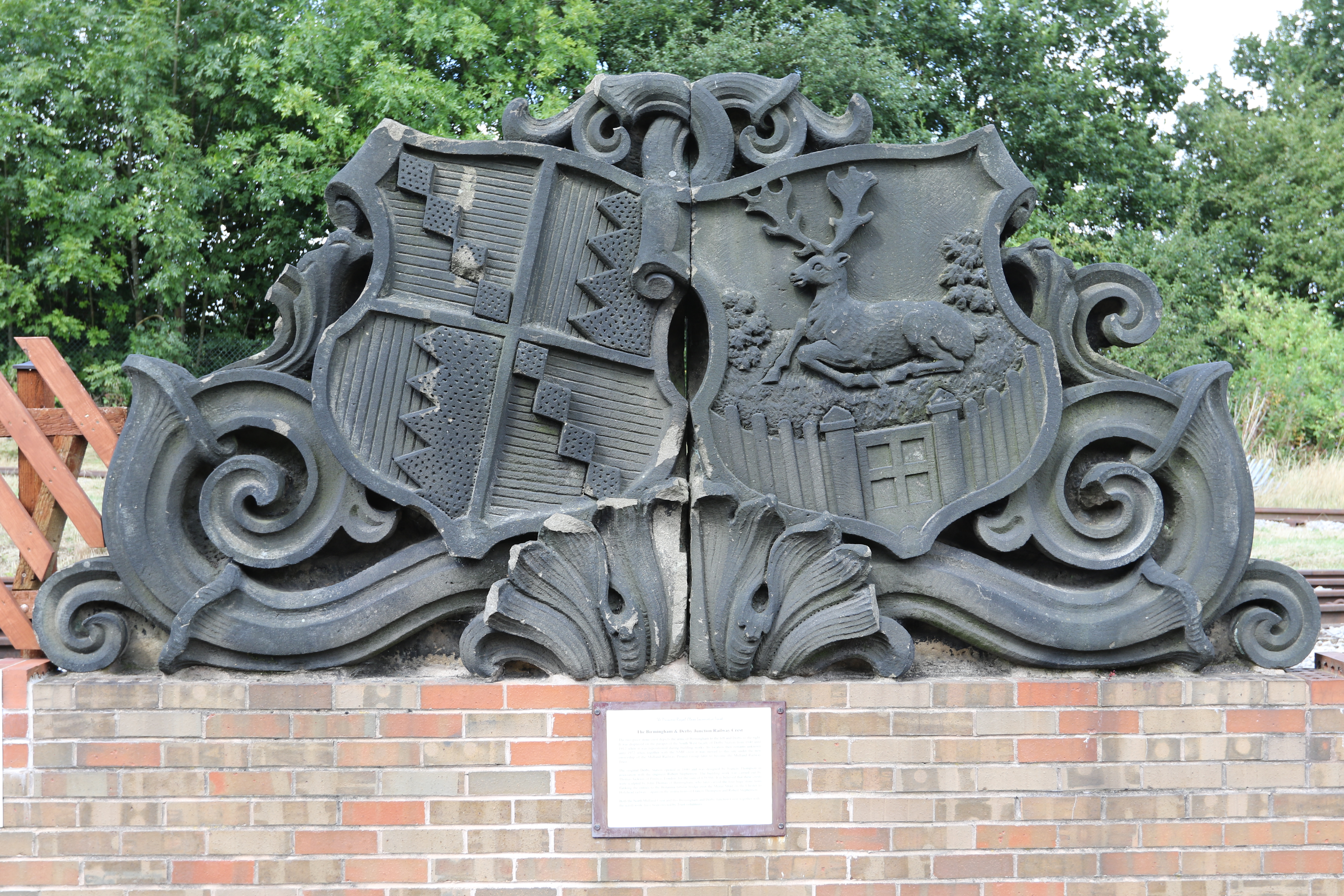

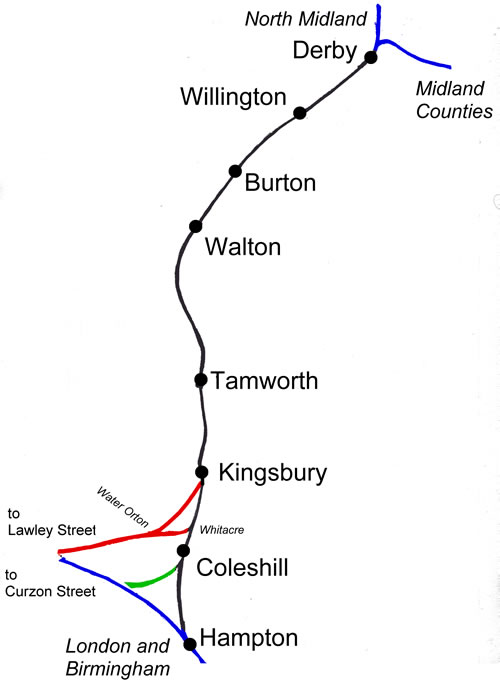
- Map of the route of the Birmingham and Derby Junction Railway

Overview
- Headquarters: Derby
- Reporting mark: BDJR
- Dates of operation: 1839–1844
- Successor: Midland Railway

Technical
- Track gauge: 4 ft 8 1/2 in (1,435 mm) standard gauge
- Length: 42 miles (68 km)

Stations and landmarks

Original stations shown in bold type
**Hampton-in-Arden**
**Coleshill**
1842 Birmingham Lawley Street
1842 Birmingham Curzon Street
1854 Birmingham New Street
1854 Saltley
1896 Bromford Bridge
1842 Castle Bromwich
1842 Water Orton
1842 Forge Mills
1864 Whitacre Junction
**Kingsbury**
1842 Wilnecote
**Tamworth**
1850 Elford
1840 Croxall
1855 Wichnor Junction
**Barton and Walton**
1889 Branston
**Burton upon Trent**
**Willington**
Peartree
**London Road**
**Derby**

The Birmingham and Derby Junction Railway (B&DJR) was an early British railway company, from 1839 to 1844.

It originally opened in 1839 from Derby to the London and Birmingham Railway at Hampton-in-Arden. In 1842, it opened a direct branch of its own to Birmingham, with a terminus at Lawley Street. At Derby, it connected with the North Midland Railway and the Midland Counties Railway at what became known as the Tri Junct Station. The three companies later merged to become the Midland Railway

The line now forms part of the Cross Country Route, the main route between the West Country and the North East.

== Origins ==
Although Birmingham was served by an extensive canal network (indeed, it is suggested they were a factor in its growth as an engineering centre), there were technical problems since Birmingham was on rising ground.

As early as 1824, Birmingham businessmen had been looking at the possibilities of the railway. The London and Birmingham Railway and the Grand Junction Railway had obtained their necessary Acts of Parliament in 1833 and a scheme for a line to Gloucester and Bristol was in the air. The North Midland had been floated in 1833 and a proposal was made to connect to its terminus at Derby

George Stephenson surveyed the route in 1835. The bill envisaged the line as running through Whitacre to meet the London and Birmingham Railway with a junction at Stechford to travel into the latter's terminus at Curzon Street. It would also run from Whitacre to Hampton-in-Arden, where it would join the L&B for connections to London.

The promoters came into conflict with those of the Midland Counties Railway even before the bills were presented to Parliament since the lines would compete with each other. In the end, the Birmingham and Derby line agreed to withdraw its branch to Hampton if it the Midland Counties withdrew its line along the Erewash valley.

Birmingham and Derby Junction Railway Act 1836
- Act of Parliament
- Parliament of the United Kingdom
- Long title: An Act for making a Railway from the London and Birmingham Railway near Birmingham, to Derby, to be called "The Birmingham and Derby Junction Railway," with a Branch.
- Citation: 6 & 7 Will. 4. c. xxxv

Dates
- Royal assent: 19 May 1836

Text of statute as originally enacted

The Hampton branch was removed, but when the Midland Counties presented its bill, it still contained the Erewash line (although it was later dropped on the insistence of the North Midland Railway). Samuel Carter, the Birmingham and Derby solicitor, immediately issued the statutory notices for its branch and was able to incorporate it in the act. Royal assent for the Birmingham and Derby Junction Railway Act 1836 (6 & 7 Will. 4. c. xxxv) was given on 19 May 1836 with the active support of the prime minister Robert Peel, the member for Tamworth. The branch later became known as the Stonebridge Railway.

== Construction ==
George's son Robert Stephenson took on the post of engineer, with an assistant, John Cass Birkinshaw. Some 42 miles (68 km) long, there was no gradient steeper than 1 in 339. The design included two viaducts (the Anker Viaduct, now known as the Bolehall Viaduct) and the Wichnor Viaduct (also known as the Croxall Viaduct), seventy eight bridges and a cutting at the approach to Derby, consideration being given to the danger of flooding by the River Trent.

The Anker Viaduct is 807 feet (246 m) long, and the Croxall Viaduct is 1,310 feet (400 m) long.

The rails were single parallel form, 56 pounds per yard (28 kg/m), set in chairs upon cross sleepers. Although the standard gauge was used to match the other railways it was associated with, the rails were actually set at 4 ft 9 in (1,450 mm) apart to allow extra play.

== History ==
Birmingham and Derby Junction Railway Act 1837
- Act of Parliament
- Parliament of the United Kingdom
- Long title: An Act to rectify a Mistake in an Act of the last Session of Parliament[n] for making a Railway from the London and Birmingham Railway near Birmingham to Derby, to be called the Birmingham and Derby Junction Railway, with a Branch.
- Citation: 7 Will. 4 & 1 Vict. c. lxv

Dates
- Royal assent: 30 June 1837

Birmingham and Derby Junction Railway Act 1838
- Act of Parliament
- Parliament of the United Kingdom
- Long title: An Act to alter the Line of the Birmingham and Derby Junction Railway.
- Citation: 1 & 2 Vict. c. lxxxii

Dates
- Royal assent: 27 July 1838

Text of statute as originally enacted

Birmingham and Derby Junction Railway Act 1840
- Act of Parliament
- Parliament of the United Kingdom
- Long title: An Act to make a further Alteration in the Line of the Birmingham and Derby Junction Railway, and an Approach thereto at Tamworth, and to amend the Acts relating to the said Railway.
- Citation: 3 & 4 Vict. c. li

Dates
- Royal assent: 4 June 1840
Other legislation
Repealed by	Midland Railway Consolidation Act 1844

Status: Repealed

Birmingham and Derby Junction Railway Act 1842
- Act of Parliament
- Parliament of the United Kingdom
- Long title: An Act to enable the Birmingham and Derby Junction Railway Company to raise a further Sum of Money.
- Citation: 5 & 6 Vict. c. xvi

Dates
- Royal assent: 13 May 1842

Text of statute as originally enacted

=== Competition ===
The B&DJR opened on 12 August 1839 with the line into Hampton, where the trains would reverse for Birmingham. There were six stations in addition to Hampton and Derby. These were Coleshill (later renamed Maxstoke), Kingsbury, Tamworth, Walton, Burton and Willington.

From the start the joint use of Curzon Street terminus, with the London and Birmingham, gave problems. On 10 February 1842 a new line was opened with a new terminus at Lawley Street. This proceeded to Whitacre via Castle Bromwich, Water Orton and Forge Mills (later renamed Coleshill). The line from Whitacre to Stechford which had not been built, was abandoned, and that to Hampton was reduced to single track.

Strong competition between the line and the Midland Counties Railway (MCR) for transport, particularly of coal, to London, almost drove both of them out of business.

The B&DJR offered a time from Derby to London of around seven hours, but when the MCR began operating it was able to make the journey in an hour less. The B&DJR lowered its fares but this simply resulted in a price war. In a war of "dirty tricks", the MCR made an agreement with the North Midland for exclusive access to its passengers. In retaliation the Birmingham board opposed a bill that the MCR had submitted to Parliament. Both lines were in dire straits and paying minuscule dividends.

The North Midland Railway (NMR) was also suffering severe financial problems arising from the original cost of the line and its buildings. At length George Hudson took control of the NMR and adopted Robert Stephenson's suggestion that the best outcome would be for the three lines to merge.

Hudson foresaw that the directors of the MCR world resist the idea and made a secret agreement with the B&DJR for the NMR to take it over. This would of course take away the MCR's customers from Derby and the North and, when news leaked out, shares in the B&DJR rose dramatically.

Hudson was able to give the MCR directors an ultimatum, and persuaded the line's shareholders to override their board and the stage was set for amalgamation.

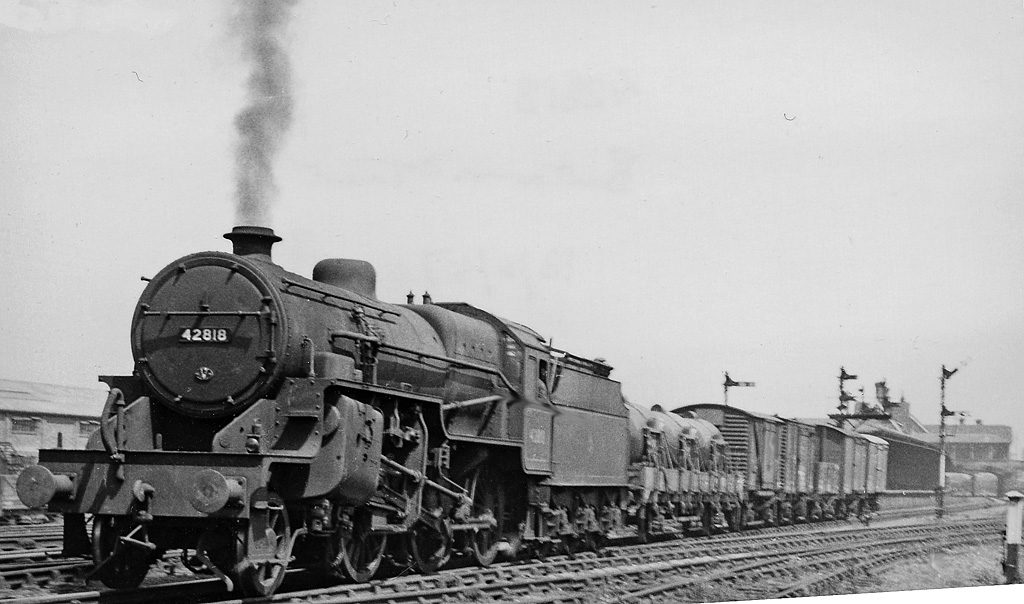
Transfer freight near Burton-on-Trent in 1957

=== Midland Railway ===
In 1844, the Birmingham and Derby Junction Railway, the Midland Counties and the North Midland Railway merged to form the new Midland Railway.

The route to Hampton-in-Arden immediately lost all importance when the companies merged, since London traffic was redirected through the shorter Midland Counties route via Rugby. Known as the Stonebridge Railway, it became a minor branch line, and struggled on as such with only one daily passenger train until 1917, when this train was withdrawn as a wartime economy measure. The line remained open until 1935 for freight-only closing when one of the original timber bridges failed. The old Birmingham and Derby Junction station building at Hampton can still be seen.

The line into Lawley Street remained important, however, for passengers to the South West, who would join the Birmingham and Gloucester Railway at Camp Hill station or, from 1841, Curzon Street.

=== Present day ===
It is now part of the main line from the North East and Newcastle, via Derby and Birmingham New Street, to the south West at Bristol Temple Meads. CrossCountry is now the principal operator on the line.

=== See also ===
- Birmingham and Derby Junction Railway Locomotives
