= Hampton-in-Arden railway station =

National railway station in England

Coordinates: 52.429°N 1.700°W

Hampton-in-Arden
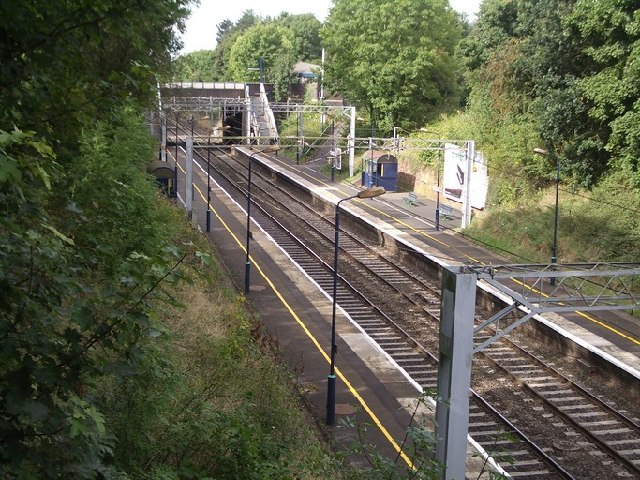

General information
- Location: Hampton-in-Arden, Solihull; England
- Grid reference: SP205812
- Manager: West Midlands Railway
- Transit authority: Transport for West Midlands
- Platforms: 2

Other information
- Station code: HIA
- Fare zone: 5
- Classification: DfT category E

History
- Original company: London and Birmingham Railway and Birmingham and Derby Junction Railway
- Pre-grouping: London and North Western Railway
- Post-grouping: London, Midland and Scottish Railway

Key dates
- 1838: Opened as Hampton
- 12 August 1839: Joint station opened
- 1 November 1849: Renamed Hampton Junction
- 1 December 1872: Renamed Hampton
- 1 September 1884: LNWR platforms resited
- July 1886: LNWR station renamed Hampton-in-Arden
- 1 January 1917: MR platform closed

Passengers
- 2021/22: ▲93,660
- 2022/23: ▲131,182
- 2023/24: ▲175,940
- 2024/25: ▲210,864
- 2025/26: ▲240,356
Location
Notes
- Passenger statistics from the Office of Rail and Road

Hampton-in-Arden railway station serves the village of Hampton-in-Arden in the West Midlands of England. It is situated on the West Coast Main Line between Coventry and Birmingham. The station, and all trains serving it, are operated by West Midlands Trains.

== History ==
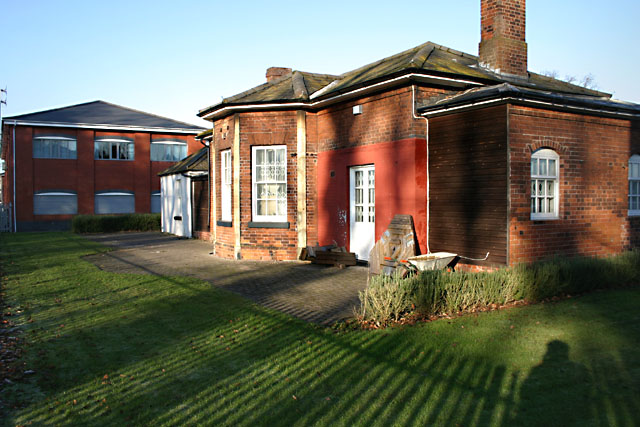
The old Hampton-in-Arden joint station building (1839)

The first station was built in 1838 as one of the original stations on the London and Birmingham Railway, and was primarily sited to serve the upcoming Birmingham and Derby Junction Railway connection to Derby. The B&DJR line arrived in 1839, and a joint junction station with the L&BR was established.

The B&DJR line, subsequently known as the Stonebridge Railway, connected with the Birmingham-Derby line at Whitacre Junction. However, the B&DJR soon became embroiled in a bitter price war with the rival Midland Counties Railway line from Derby to Rugby, culminating in the amalgamation of the rivals to form the Midland Railway in 1844, which prioritized the shorter Derby-Rugby route for traffic to London. As a result, the Stonebridge line lost much of its traffic, which was reduced to a parliamentary service by 1877. The line closed to passengers in 1917 and to all traffic in 1935, following a bridge at Packington failing its safety inspection. A small section of the line to Whitacre remained at the Hampton-in-Arden end for use as a storage siding until it was officially closed in 1952, with the track finally being lifted in early 1963.

In 1884, the London and North Western Railway (successors of the L&BR) resited their platforms to the present-day station site, located approximately 30 chains southeast of the original site. The Midland Railway platform remained at the original site to serve their parliamentary trains until their discontinuation in 1917.

Prior to the opening of nearby Birmingham International station in 1976, express electric trains took just 90 minutes to run between Birmingham New Street and London Euston and called at Hampton-in-Arden, providing not only an extra commuter stop between Birmingham and Coventry but also served passengers using Birmingham Airport. The exceptionally long platforms at the current station are all that remains to show that these express services once stopped there.

The original B&DJR station house and separate ticket and parcels building still stand in Old Station Road and are used as offices. They are separately Grade II listed buildings, protecting them from unauthorised alteration or demolition. Together, they comprise a rare surviving example of architecture from the beginning of the railway age, and one of two remaining intermediate station buildings in Britain from the early days of railways, the other being the original Watford station in Hertfordshire.

After the original station's closure, much of the site was reclaimed for use as a sawmill, owned by Messrs Blackwell & Co.

== Facilities ==
The station has a ticket office located by the station entrance on High Street which is open Monday-Friday 07:00-10:00 and Saturday 09:00-14:00. When the ticket office is open tickets must be purchased before boarding the train. Outside of these times there is a ticket machine outside the ticket office which accepts card payments only - cash and voucher payments can be made to the senior conductor on the train.

Step free access is only available on the Coventry bound platform. The nearest station with full step free access is Berkswell.

== Services ==
Hampton-in-Arden is served by two trains per hour each way, to Birmingham New Street northbound and to London Euston via Northampton southbound. Some services to/from London Euston are split at Northampton with one service running between Birmingham New Street and Northampton and another between Northampton and London Euston. The evening service towards London Euston is reduced to one train per hour.

On Sundays there is an hourly service each way between Birmingham New Street and London Euston via Northampton. There are some longer gaps of over 2 hours in services towards Coventry.

All services are operated by West Midlands Trains. Most services are operated under the London Northwestern Railway brand but some services (mainly early morning and late night services which start/terminate at Coventry) operate under the West Midlands Railway brand.

Preceding station	National Rail	Following station
Birmingham International towards Birmingham New Street	London Northwestern Railway London–Birmingham	Berkswell towards London Euston
Birmingham International	West Midlands Railway West Coast Main Line Coventry - Birmingham New Street / Wolverhampton Limited service	Berkswell
	Disused railways	
Terminus	Midland Railway; Birmingham and Derby Junction Railway	Maxstoke; Line and station closed
