= Stonebridge Railway =

Railway line in England

The Stonebridge Railway was a railway line between Whitacre Junction and Hampton-in-Arden in Warwickshire, England, passing through Stonebridge. It had an intermediate station at Coleshill, which was renamed Maxstoke in 1923.

== History ==
The railway opened on 12 August 1839 as part of the Birmingham and Derby Junction Railway (B&DJR). It was a key part of that company's route from the North Midlands and Yorkshire, to connect with the London and Birmingham Railway (L&BR) and the South East. The line to Birmingham Lawley Street opened on 10 February 1842.

After a period of fierce competition between the B&DJR and the Midland Counties Railway (MCR) for the coal traffic to London (the MCR had a shorter route that joined with the L&BR at Rugby), the two merged, with the North Midland Railway, to form the Midland Railway. As all the London traffic was now diverted on the former MCR route, the Stonebridge Railway lost all strategic importance and became in effect a minor branch line. When originally opened, the Stonebridge Railway was a double tracked main line, though the second running line was removed in 1843. This is believed to be the first "singling" (downgrading a railway to single track operation) in railway history.

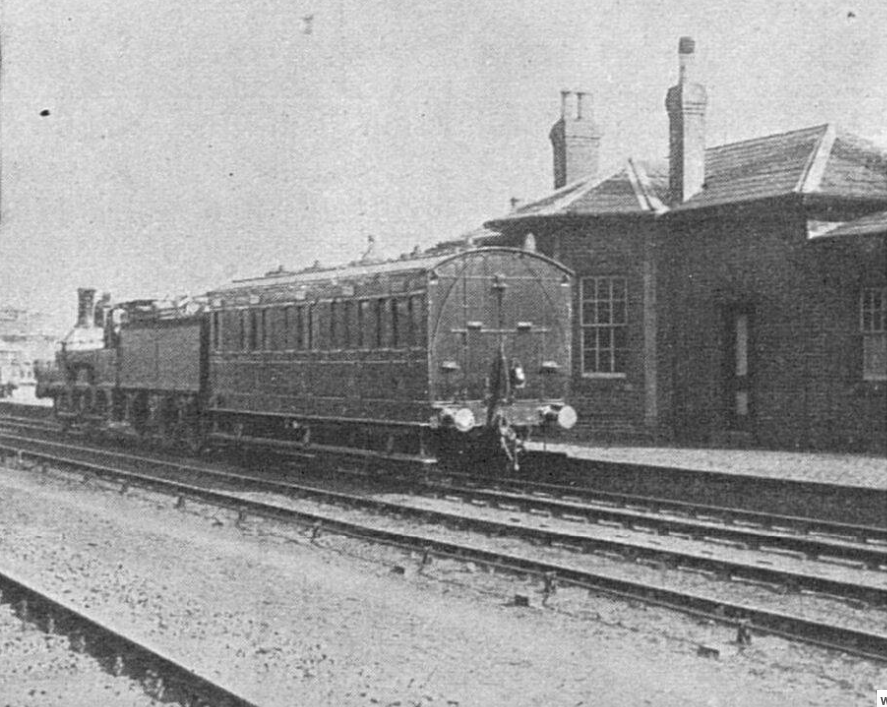
The single daily passenger train calling at Maxstoke in 1907

Even after the line was singled, until February 1845, two of the three daily services each way carried through coaches to London. The daily service was reduced from three trains to two in 1859, and from May 1877 the service was reduced to a Parliamentary train service of a single morning train in each direction. This being the minimum level of service required by law. This lasted until 1917, when the passenger service was finally withdrawn as a wartime economy measure, while under government control (but not ownership) during the First World War. The line continued in use for freight until 1935 when it was officially closed, following a bridge failure in Packington. However, the track at the northern end remained in place, and was used as a siding for the storage of disabled wagons between the mid 1930s and 1951, when the track was finally removed. The Hampton end track had become a minor siding, and was lifted in 1963.

Two of the most famous men in the history of the Midland Railway were associated with this line - Sir James Joseph Allport (who started his career as a traffic agent in Hampden in Arden), and Matthew Kirtley (who was once the locomotive superintendent of the B&DJR). Samuel Carter was solicitor.

== Proposed reopening ==
In June 2013 a £240 million to £280 million plan was proposed to re-open the Stonebridge Railway in order to link Coventry and Birmingham Airport to an interchange station on the proposed High Speed 2 London-Birmingham line. As of January 2014, the proposal has the support of Bob Ainsworth and Christopher Pincher (Members of Parliament for Coventry North East and Tamworth), Paul Kehoe (chief executive of Birmingham Airport), Geoff Inskip, (chief executive of Centro), Birmingham City Council and Transport Minister Stephen Hammond.

The Chinese premier, Li Keqiang, also pledged in January 2014 to invest directly in the £50b billion HS2 project. China Railway Group had offered to build the connections from the proposed interchange in Birmingham to the city's airport and along to cities including Coventry and Peterborough. The 7.3-mile (11.7 km) link would run from Hampton-in-Arden, near Solihull to Whitacre Junction, in North Warwickshire. The 15-mile (24 km) journey between Tamworth and Birmingham Airport takes 45 minutes by rail, but the "Whitacre rail link" would in theory reduce the journey time to 18 minutes. As of 2014, no further development has been made.

In January 2019, Campaign for Better Transport released a report identifying the line which was listed as Priority 2 for reopening. Priority 2 is for those lines which require further development or a change in circumstances (such as housing developments).
