= Cross Country Route =

Railway line from Bristol to York, England

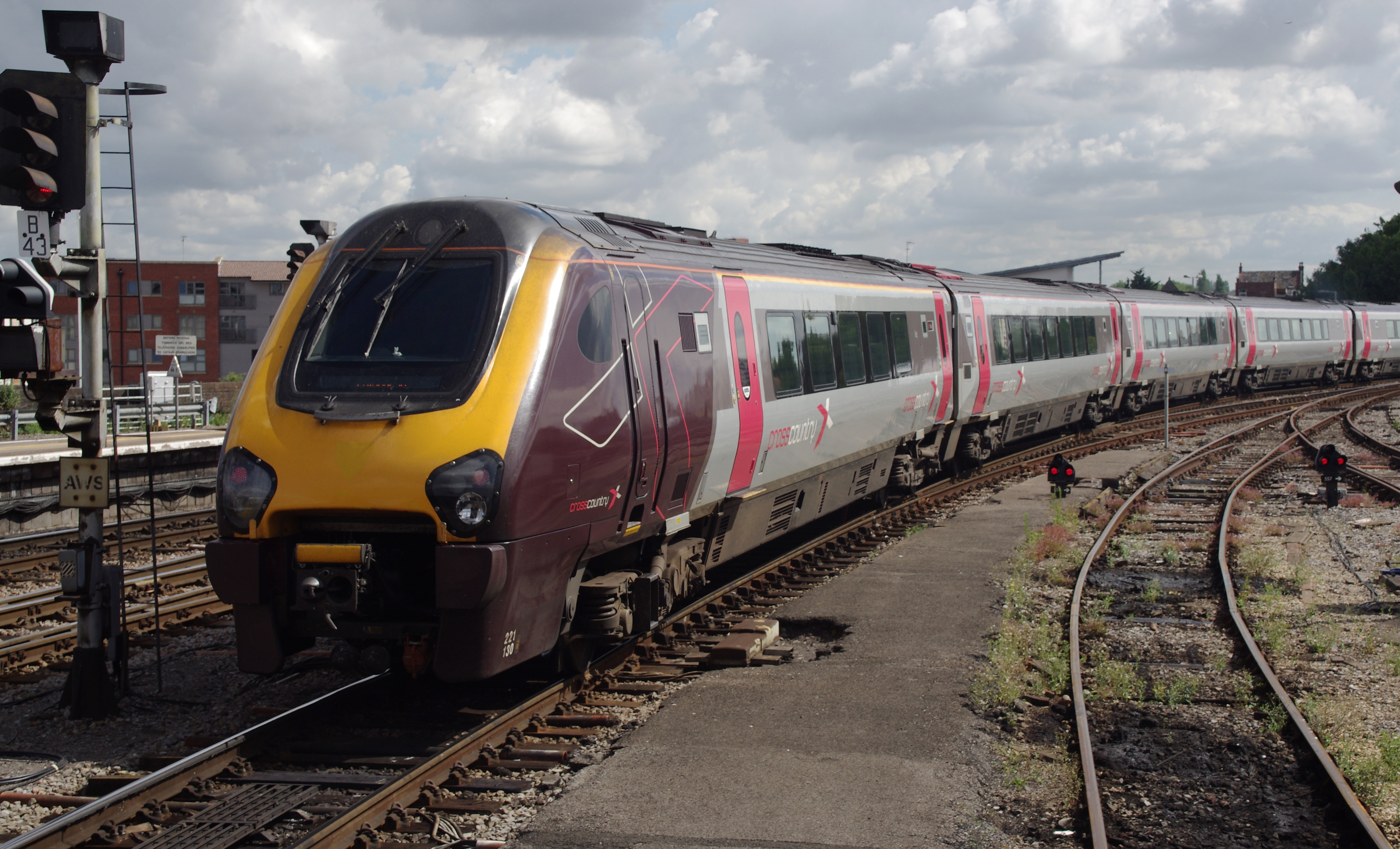
- A CrossCountry Class 221 Super Voyager departing from Bristol Temple Meads in 2010

Overview
- Status: Operational
- Owner: Network Rail
- Termini: York; Bristol Temple Meads
- Stations: 48

Service
- Type: Suburban rail, Heavy rail, Inter-city rail
- System: National Rail
- Operator(s): CrossCountry (principal operator); East Midlands Railway; Great Western Railway; Northern Trains; TransPennine Express; West Midlands Trains
- Rolling stock: Class 170 Turbostar; Class 220 Voyager; Class 221 Super Voyager

Technical
- Track gauge: 1,435 mm (4 ft 8 1/2 in) standard gauge
- Electrification: Partial 25 kV AC OHLE, from Bromsgrove to Birmingham New Street, Doncaster and Wakefield Westgate to Neville Hill TMD, Colton Junction to York; In progress: Colton Junction to Church Fenton
- Operating speed: Up to 125 mph (200 km/h) maximum, some sections limited to 100 mph (160 km/h)
Route map
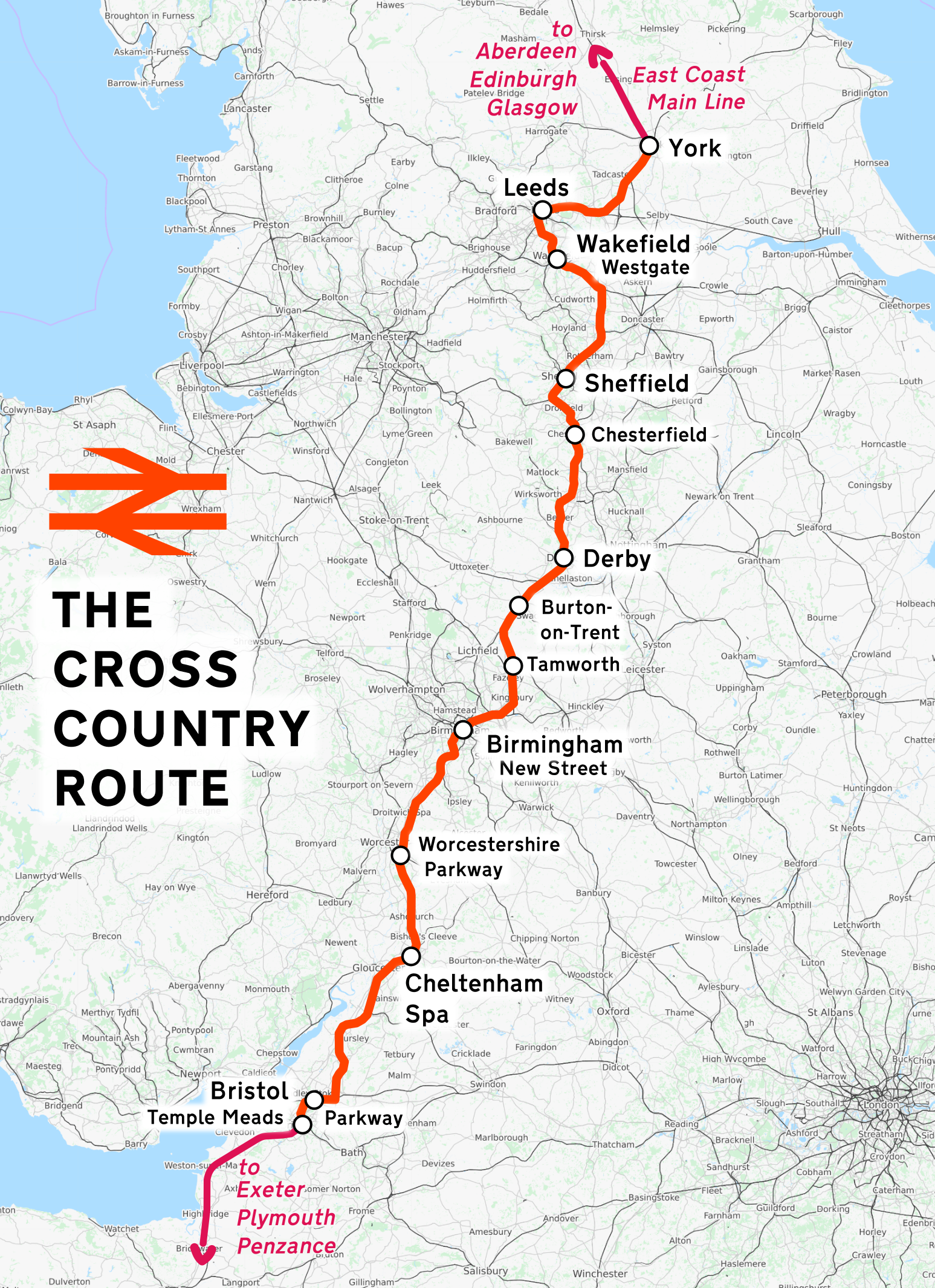
(Click to expand)

The Cross Country Route is a long-distance railway route in England, which runs from Bristol Temple Meads to York via Birmingham New Street, Derby, Sheffield and Leeds or Doncaster. Inter-city services on the route, which include some of the longest passenger journeys in the UK such as Aberdeen to Plymouth, are operated by CrossCountry.

It is classed as a high-speed line because its sections from Birmingham to Wakefield Westgate and from Leeds to York have a speed limit of 125 mph (200 km/h); however, the section from Birmingham to Bristol is limited to 100 mph (160 km/h) because of numerous level crossings, especially half-barrier level crossings, and the section from Wakefield to Leeds has the same limit because of a number of curves.

== History ==
The Birmingham–Bristol section was built as the Birmingham and Gloucester and Bristol and Gloucester Railways (Note: Briefly amalgamated as the Birmingham and Bristol Railway) before joining the Midland Railway, the southern forerunner to the cross-country route. From Birmingham to the north-northeast, the line had three separately owned sections, namely the:

- Birmingham and Derby Junction Railway to Derby, thence the
- North Midland Railway to Leeds, thence the
- York and North Midland Railway.

From the Labour Government's nationalisation in 1948 until privatisation in 1990, the route ran through all six regions of British Rail but did not have timetabling priority in any of them. Therefore, the services were poorly promoted and thus not always well-patronised.

Most Derby–Nottingham local passenger trains were taken over by diesel units from 14 April 1958, taking about 34 minutes between the two cities.

In the 1990s most services were operated by British Rail's InterCity business unit. As part of the privatisation of British Rail, these were taken over by Virgin CrossCountry in 1997, with the Class 47 hauled Mark 2 and High Speed Train sets replaced by Class 220 and Class 221 diesel multiple units in the early 2000s.

The use of the route for freight has decreased, because of the bulk of haulage switching to roads and the building of the M5, M6 and M1 motorways.

=== Abortive British Rail proposals for complete electrification ===
In the 1960s the route was considered for electrification. In the early 1980s, electrification was again discussed at length and documentation for various proposals was produced in 1981. This would have been particularly beneficial for climbing the Lickey Incline between Cheltenham and Birmingham, as many of the early diesels were under-powered. In 1977 the Parliamentary Select Committee on Nationalised Industries recommended considering electrification of more of Britain's rail network, and by 1979 BR presented a range of options that included electrifying the Cross Country Route by 2000. Under the governments that succeeded the 1976–79 Labour government, the proposal was not implemented.

== Route ==
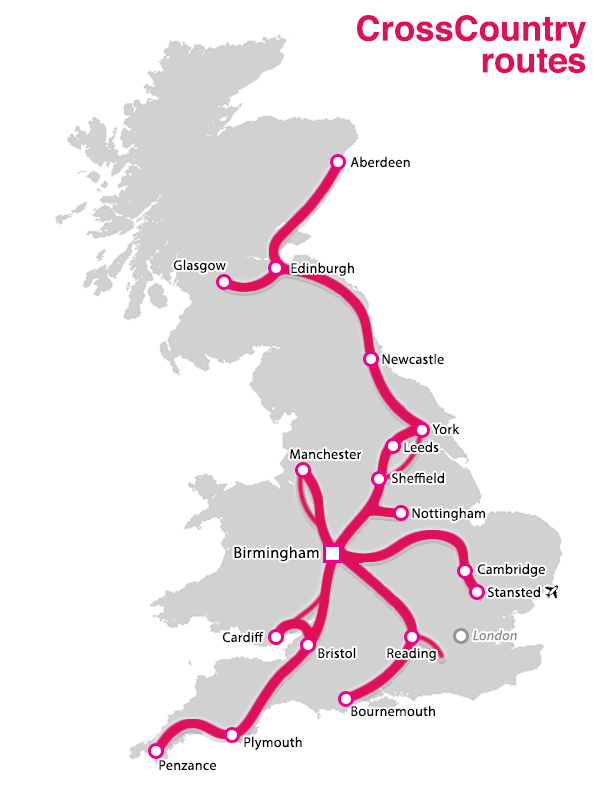
Map of Cross Country network. The core Cross Country Route is between Bristol and York

The route is well connected, and shares substantial portions of its route with other lines:

- The Severn Beach line in Bristol between Temple Meads and Stapleton Road
- The South Wales Main Line around Bristol Parkway
- The Birmingham to Worcester via Bromsgrove line between Bromsgrove and Birmingham New Street
- The Cross-City Line between Barnt Green and New Street
- The Birmingham-Peterborough line between New Street and Water Orton
- The Birmingham and Derby Junction Railway between Derby and Tamworth
- The Midland Main Line between Derby and Sheffield
- The Wakefield line between Sheffield and Leeds
- The Hallam and Penistone lines between Sheffield and Meadowhall
- The Dearne Valley line between Sheffield and Moorthorpe, and between Church Fenton and York
- The Selby Line between Leeds and Micklefield

Major cities and towns served along the route include:

- Bristol
- Cheltenham
- Worcester, England
- Birmingham
- Tamworth, Staffordshire
- Burton-upon-Trent
- Derby
- Chesterfield, Derbyshire
- Sheffield
- Wakefield
- Leeds
- York

Nominal start-point at Derby

Milepost zero for the main predecessor Derby to Bristol route has always been Derby, hence a train travelling the whole route starts out going "up" then becomes "down". The Birmingham to Derby section of the route has a line speed of 125 mph (200 km/h), while Birmingham to Bristol is restricted to 100 mph (160 km/h) because of a number of half-barrier level crossings.

=== Electrification ===
The line is not fully electrified, but some sections are overhead electrified at 25 kV AC such as Bromsgrove to Grand Junction, with further electrified sections around Leeds and the East Coast Main Line near York. Network Rail stated in 2014 that the line between Derby and Sheffield would be electrified as part of the Midland Main Line upgrade. However, the electrification programme was severely cut back in July 2017. As of 2023, Network Rail is working on the section between York and Church Fenton. The rest of the section between Leeds and York has electrification planned as part of the Transpennine Route Upgrade, which itself is part of the Integrated Rail Plan for the North and Midlands. This plan also includes full Midland Main Line electrification and upgrades.

Electrification between Westerleigh Junction (near Yate, Gloucestershire) and Bristol Temple Meads was planned as part of the 21st-century modernisation of the Great Western Main Line, but as of 2024 work has yet to progress beyond Filton East Curve, south-west of Bristol Parkway.

== Services ==
Most long-distance services on the route are operated by Class 220/221 Voyagers, although a few services, until recently, operated using InterCity 125 High Speed Trains. These trains are capable of achieving 125 mph (200 km/h), compared to the previous Class 47s and Mk 2 coaching stock, which had a top speed of 95 mph (150 km/h).

== See also ==
- CrossCountry
- Rail services in the West of England
- Tees–Exe line
- Transport in Wales
- Virgin CrossCountry
