= Lawley Street railway station =

Disused railway station in Birmingham, West Midlands

Lawley Street
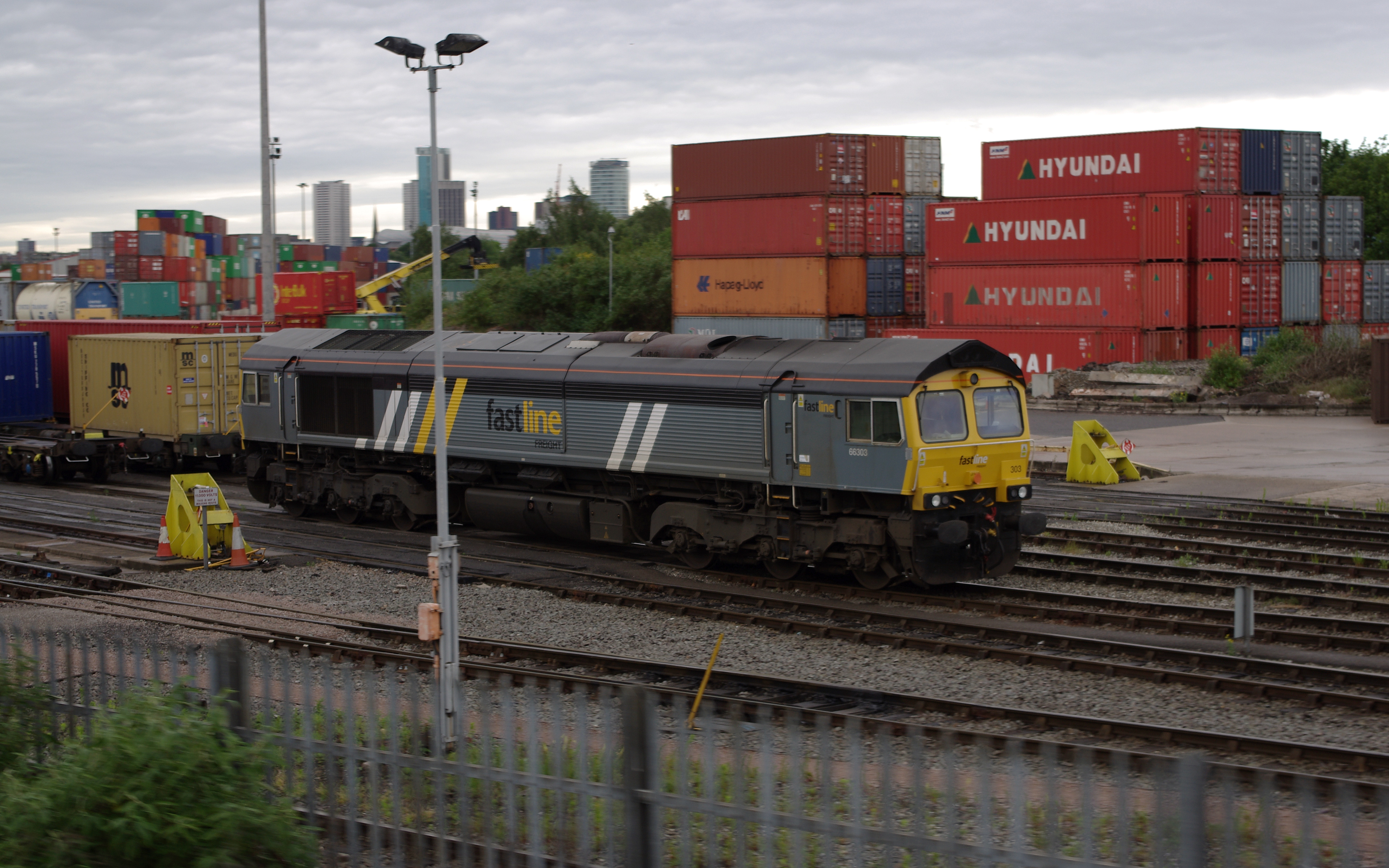
- An ex-Fastline Class 66 locomotive stands in the Lawley Street Freightliner Terminal, on the site of the old station.

General information
- Location: Bordesley, Birmingham; England
- Coordinates: 52.4826°N 1.8750°W
- Grid reference: SP085871

Other information
- Status: Disused

History
- Original company: Birmingham and Derby Junction Railway
- Pre-grouping: Midland Railway

Key dates
- 10 February 1842: Opened
- 1 March 1851: Closed to passengers
Location

Lawley Street railway station was opened in Birmingham, England on 10 February 1842, by the Birmingham and Derby Junction Railway.

The B&DJR had opened on 12 August 1839 with a line to Hampton, where it met the London and Birmingham Railway for passengers from Derby and the North East. Trains would reverse for Birmingham and travel into Curzon Street.

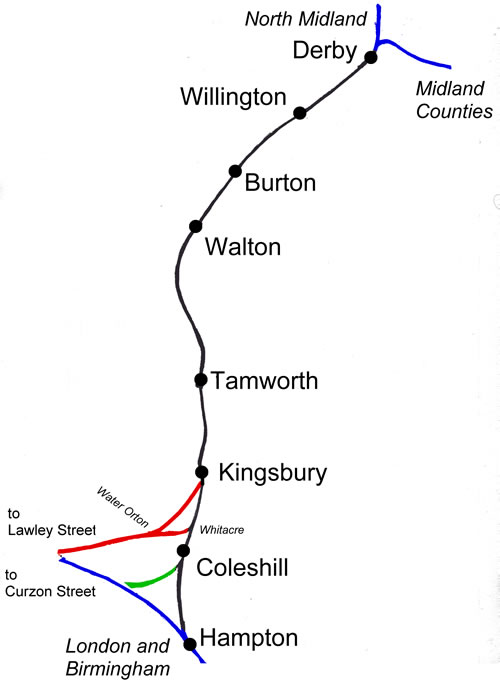
Sketchmap of Birmingham and Derby Junction Railway

This gave problems from the start and, although it had been planned to run direct through a junction near Stechford, this was not proceeded with. Permission was sought for a new line, via the Tame valley, to a new station nearby.

In 1842, a new line was opened with a new terminus at Lawley Street. This proceeded from a junction at Whitacre with stations at Forge Mills (later renamed Coleshill), Water Orton and Castle Bromwich.

In 1851, the Midland Railway once more began to use Curzon Street with a new spur between Landor Street Junction and Derby Junction. Lawley Street then became a goods depot.
