= Sentinel (sculpture) =

2000 sculpture in Birmingham, UK

Coordinates: 52.5134°N 1.7981°W

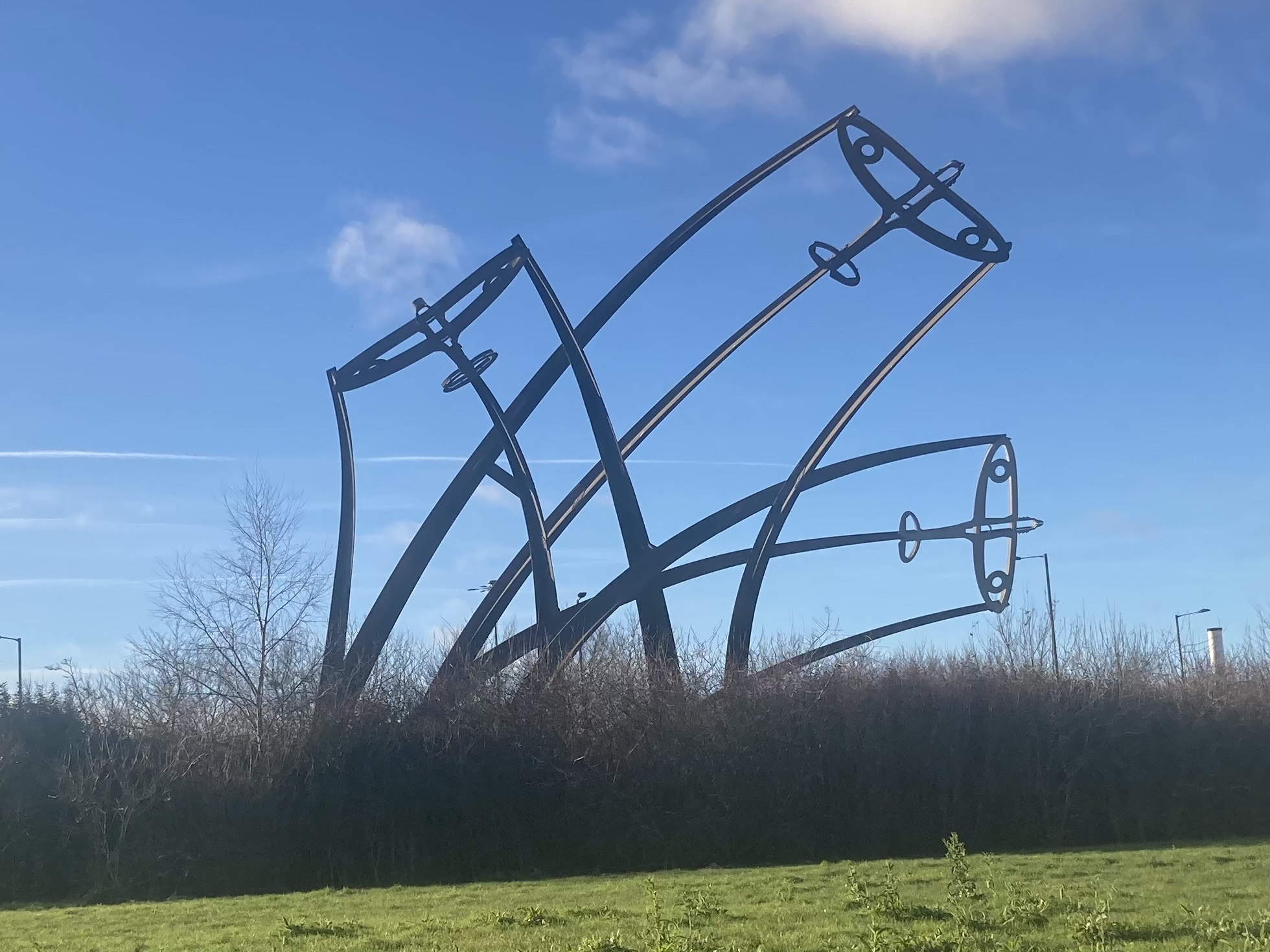
- Interactive map of Sentinel
- Designer: Tim Tolkien
- Completion date: 2006

Sentinel (grid reference SP13789065) is a 16-metre-high (52 ft) sculpture by Tim Tolkien, installed upon Spitfire Island, a roundabout at the intersection of the Chester Road and the A47 Fort Parkway at the entrance to the Castle Vale estate in Birmingham, England.

It is near Junction 5 of the M6 motorway and the present day Jaguar Cars plant (the former Castle Bromwich aircraft factory). It shows three Supermarine Spitfires peeling off up into the air in different directions. The half-scale Spitfires are made of aluminium, with curving steel supporting beams which act as vapour trails. It captures the dynamics of the Spitfire in flight and commemorates the nearby Castle Bromwich factory where most of Britain's wartime Spitfires were built.

There are proposals to move the sculpture to a new site, near its current location, to allow for road widening.

== History ==
The award-winning project began in 1997 as part of the regeneration of Castle Vale estate. Using National Lottery funding, Tolkien was appointed as artist in residence. He consulted with Castle Vale residents about an art feature and found that they were inspired above all else by the area's air history, during World War II, and favoured a sculpture featuring Spitfires. The sculpture was opened on 14 November 2000. The sculptor is the great-nephew of J. R. R. Tolkien (the author of The Lord of the Rings, who grew up in Birmingham).

The main commercial sponsors of the spitfire sculpture were from Jaguar, Rubery Owen Holdings and Cincinnati. Both Cincinnati and Rubery Owen Holdings made component parts for the Spitfires which were assembled by Jaguar at their factory, the former Castle Bromwich Spitfire and Avro Lancaster bomber factory.

The Castle Bromwich Aerodrome Factory was built in 1940 to produce planes for the war effort. These were mostly Spitfires (almost 12,000 were made there, from 1940 to 1945) and Lancaster bombers. Over 37,000 test flights were made from Castle Bromwich Aerodrome, the planes being towed across the road from the factory to the Aerodrome when completed. The Chief Test Pilot throughout this period, Alex Henshaw, unveiled the sculpture.

The aerodrome site and the adjacent British Industries Fair site (forerunner of the nearby National Exhibition Centre) are now wholly taken up by the Castle Vale estate.
