= Castle Bromwich Aerodrome =

- IATA: none; ICAO: none

Summary
- Airport type: Aircraft manufacture
- Operator: Vickers-Armstrongs
- Location: Castle Bromwich
- Built: 1914
- In use: 1914-1958
- Coordinates: 52°31′02″N 001°47′12″W

Map
- Location in Birmingham Castle Bromwich Aerodrome (Warwickshire) Castle Bromwich Aerodrome (West Midlands (region))

Runways
| Direction | Length | | Surface |
| Direction | ft | m | Surface |
|---|---|---|---|
| 05/23 | 1,500 | 594 | Asphalt, and Grass (Note: Originally all grass approx 3,000 ft length, but later aerial images show a short length (594m) of asphalt, continuing onto an unspecified length of grass) |

Castle Bromwich Aerodrome was an early airfield, situated to the north of Castle Bromwich in the West Midlands of England. The site now falls within the City of Birmingham.

== History ==
=== The early years; 1909 to 1937 ===
A large piece of Warwickshire grassland (Castle Bromwich playing fields) became the privately owned Castle Bromwich aerodrome, when Alfred P Maxfield flew the first aeroplane in the Birmingham area in September 1909. In 1911, Bentfield C Hucks flew a Bleriot monoplane and gave passenger flights. The Midland Aero Club established itself, and a hangar was built for the aeroplanes. It became a stopping place during early air races. At the start of World War I the War Office requisitioned the airfield for use by the Royal Flying Corps and flying schools in 1914, when proper roads and buildings were established.

In 1915 No. 5 Reserve Aeroplane Squadron was formed, later becoming the No 5 Training Squadron. Nine other Royal Flying Corps and Royal Air Force squadrons resided at the airfield during and just after World War I:

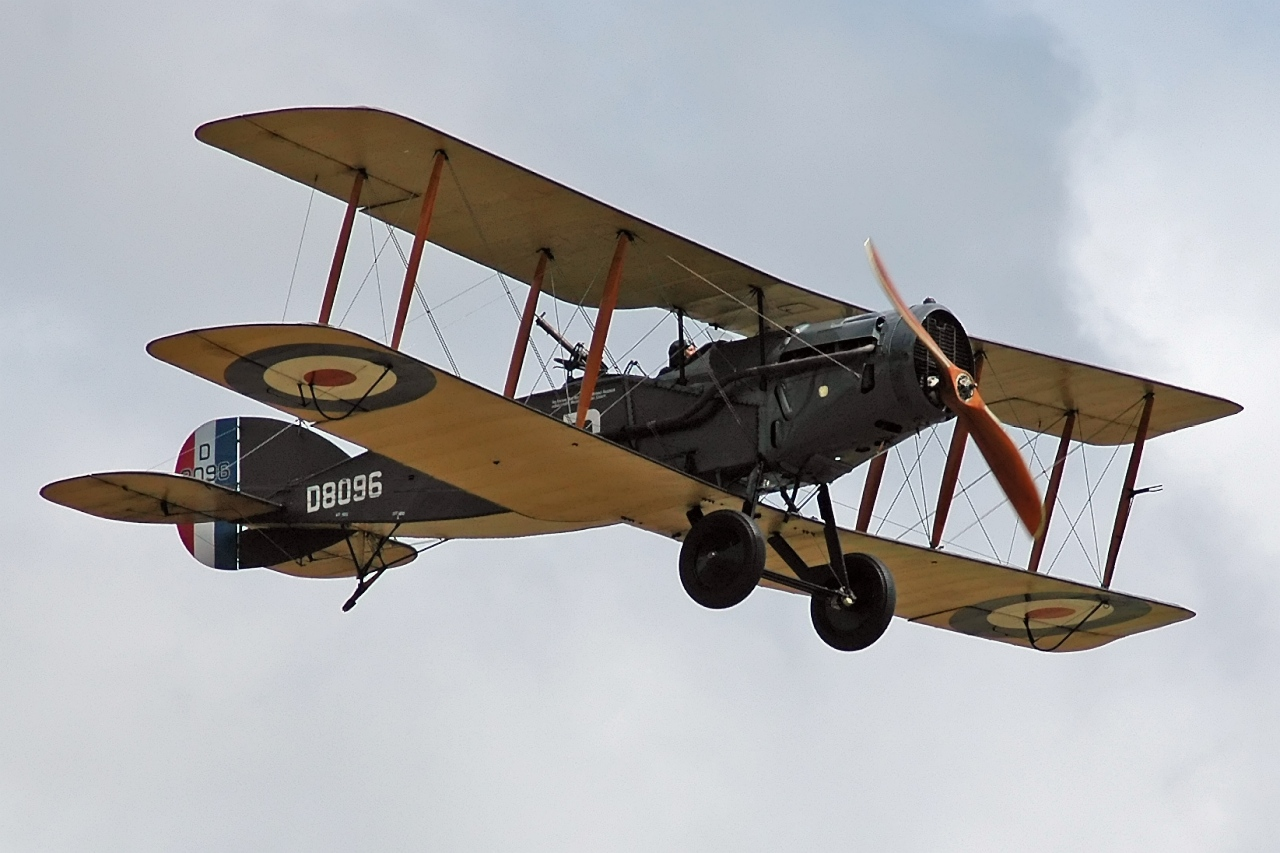
A Bristol F.2 Fighter

- No. 9 Squadron RAF between 30 July 1919 and 31 December 1919 flying the Bristol F.2 Fighter before it was disbanded.
- No. 19 Squadron RFC formed on 1 September 1915 before leaving on 31 January 1916 which flew the Avro 504 then Royal Aircraft Factory R.E.7.
- No. 34 Squadron RFC formed on 7 January 1916 before moving to Beverley in March 1916. The squadron flew the Royal Aircraft Factory B.E.2c/e.
- No. 38 Squadron RFC Reformed at the airfield on 14 July 1916 before moving to Melton Mowbray on 1 October 1916. The squadron flew the B.E.2e then the Royal Aircraft Factory B.E.12.
- No. 54 Squadron RFC formed at the airfield on 15 May 1916 flying the B.E.2c, Avro 504 and the Sopwith Pup before moving to London Colney on 22 December 1916.

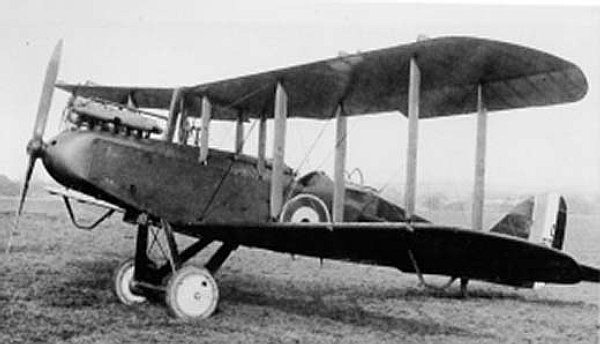
A Airco D.H.9

- No. 55 Squadron RFC formed on 27 April 1916 before moving to RFC Lilbourne on 10 June 1916. The squadron flew various aircraft including the B.E.2c/e, the Armstrong Whitworth F.K.8 and the Avro 504.
- No. 71 Squadron RFC was formed on 2 April 1917 before being moved to Saint-Omer on 18 December 1917.
- No. 115 Squadron RAF moved from RAF Netheravon on 17 July 1918 and stayed until 29 August 1918 before moving to Roville-aux-Chênes.
- No. 132 Squadron RAF moved from Ternhill on 19 August 1918 and stayed until 23 December 1918 when it was disbanded.
- No. 605 (County of Warwick) Squadron AAF formed at Castle Bromwich on 5 October 1926 and remained until 27 August 1939 when the squadron moved to RAF Tangmere. A small number of aircraft were used like Airco DH.9As, Westland Wapiti IIAs, Hawker Harts and Hawker Hinds.

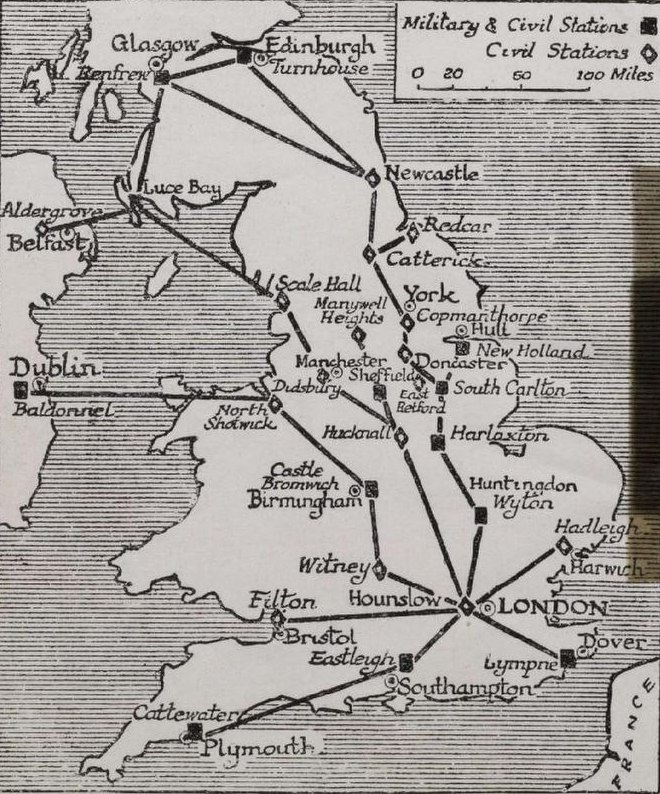
"Map of Air Routes and Landing Places in Great Britain, as temporarily arranged by the Air Ministry for civilian flying", published in 1919, showing Castle Bromwich as a "military and civil station", and as a stop on the route between Hounslow, near London, and Baldonnel, near Dublin.

After the war, Imperial Airways started a service from Hendon Aerodrome, London. The aircraft used initially carried four passengers. In the inter war years, the aerodrome had a dual military and civilian function. In September 1922 the airfield was used as a staging point for the first round of the King's Cup air race. Air pageants were held in the 1920.

In 1930 the first scheduled airmail service was operated by Imperial Airways. During the rail strike in 1919, the RAF and Vickers Ltd had flown mail and newspapers from London to Castle Bromwich aerodrome. After World War I, workers from Fort Dunlop, the Dunlop factory on the other side of the Chester Road, used some of the bungalows at the airfield due to a housing shortage.

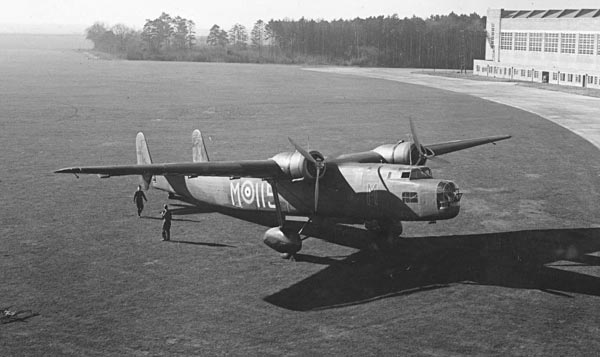
A Handley Page H.P.54 Harrow

From 1920, and every year into the 1930s, the British Industries Fair (the forerunner of the National Exhibition Centre), was held in buildings built on land adjacent to the aerodrome and Castle Bromwich railway station.

In 1934, the Air Ministry stated that Castle Bromwich aerodrome could not be used for civil purposes indefinitely, so a new airport was built at Elmdon (some five miles (8.0 km) away), that is just outside the Birmingham city boundary. It opened in 1939, and is now the present Birmingham Airport.

In 1937, more hangars and a squadron headquarters were built for the Royal Air Force. In 1939, it was extended further to become a fighter station and a base for other units. The airfield was also used for experimental purposes, including the Handley Page H.P.54 Harrow, an early twin-engined heavy bomber.

=== 1937-1945 ===
As the Second World War approached, the Air Minister, Kingsley Wood, asked Lord Nuffield if he would establish a new shadow factory to produce aeroplanes. This was to be built between Fort Dunlop and the airfield. Construction commenced on 14 July 1938 and an initial order for 1,000 Spitfires was placed on 12 April 1939. Castle Bromwich Aeroplane Factory was then the largest of its kind in Britain; it covered 345 acres (1.40 km^{2}) and employed 12,000 people. The site plan shows main offices, drawing offices, tool rooms, stores for finished parts, areas for the assembly of wings and fuselages, and covering of tailplanes and fins, drape shops (for covering of parts including petrol tanks), canteens, surgeries, sports and social clubs, and power-generating plants.

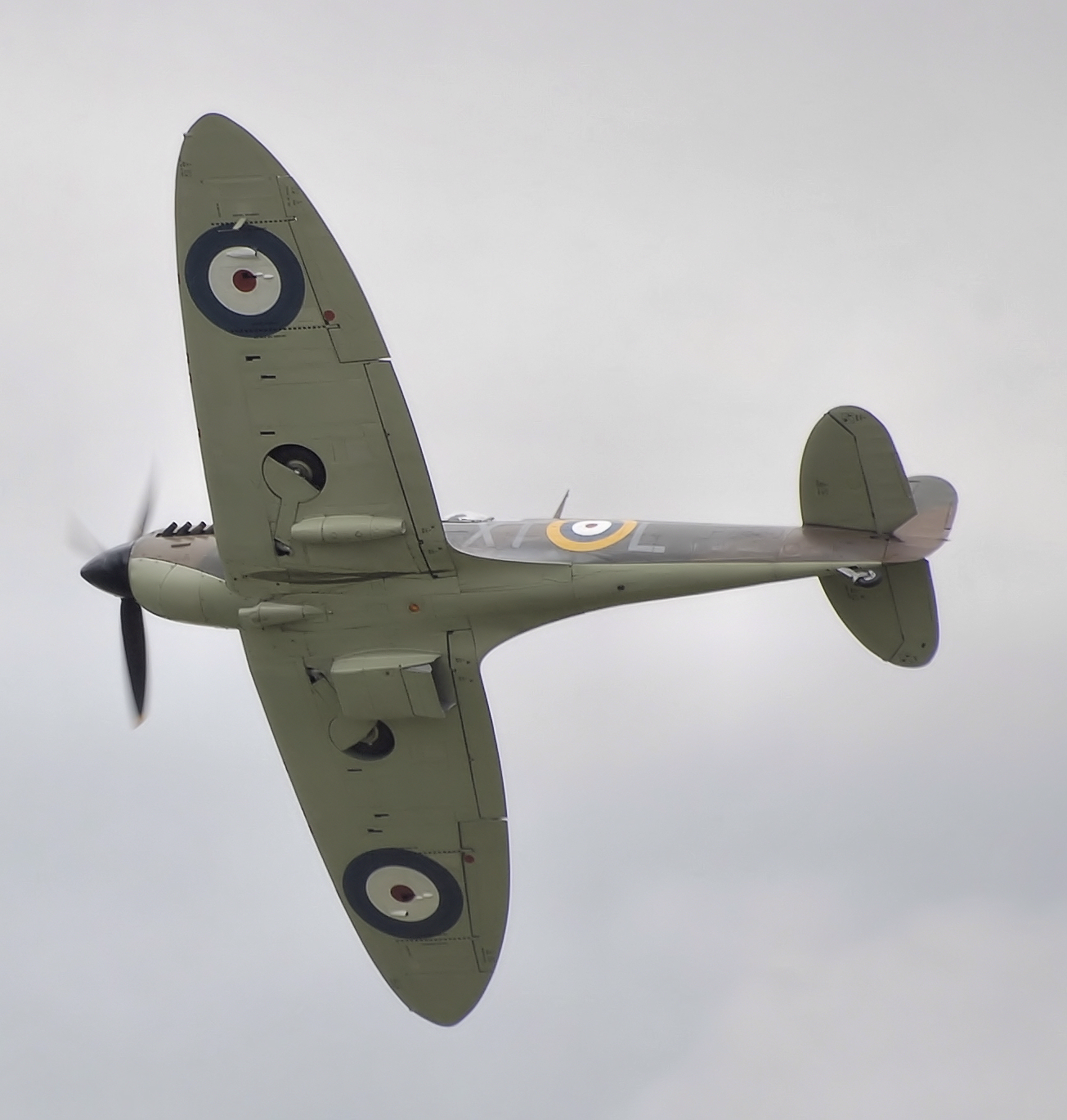
This Spitfire Mk IIA, now owned by the Battle of Britain Memorial Flight, was built at Castle Bromwich

During March 1940, Vickers-Armstrongs was placed in charge of the factory. The factory built somewhere between 11,555 and 11,939 Spitfires, over half of the total number produced. Often fifty Spitfires a week were made with a peak of 320. In 1941, 200 Avro Lancaster Mk II bombers were ordered, by the end of the war 300 Lancaster of various marks had been built. Fifty Seafire 45s were also made. In 1943, a bomb was dropped on the factory, causing some production to be dispersed to other sites around the Midlands. There had been a fatal bombing at the factory on 13 August 1940, in which six workers were killed.

When aircraft were completed, they were towed across the main Chester Road to the airfield where they were flown by test pilots and delivered to the RAF by Air Transport Auxiliary pilots. Alex Henshaw was Chief Test Pilot from 1940 to 1945, personally putting more than 10% of the aeroplanes produced through their paces, and providing some spectacular air displays with Spitfires. Henshaw became a celebrated flyer before the war by winning the King's Cup Air Race, and also by completing a record breaking solo flight to Cape Town and back.

The airfield was only used by one squadron which was No. 577 Squadron RAF which formed on 1 December 1943 and used the airfield until 15 June 1946 when it was disbanded. A variety of aircraft were used but the main aircraft were the Hawker Hurricane IIC/IV and the Airspeed Oxford I/II before being replaced by Supermarine Spitfires VB/IX/XVI.

The airfield was visited by many famous people. Winston Churchill (Prime Minister) and Mrs Eleanor Roosevelt (wife of Franklin D Roosevelt – President of the United States) visited on 26 September 1941. The King of Norway also visited during the war.

=== After World War II ===
Postwar, the airfield reverted to being a training station. Various units used it and there was an annual display to mark the anniversary of the Battle of Britain. Civilian flights returned, including the first scheduled helicopter service from London. The aeroplane factory was closed in 1945 and became a car factory. It was first sold to Fisher & Ludlow, which was acquired by the British Motor Corporation in 1953. Later, it became part of Jaguar. Part of the original site was also bought by Dunlop to extend its premises, and house its research programme.

The aerodrome was also used by the following units:

- No. 5 Reserve Flying School RAF
- No. 5 Reserve Squadron
- No. 6 Anti-Aircraft Co-operation Unit RAF
- No. 7 Anti-Aircraft Co-operation Unit RAF
- No. 8 Anti-Aircraft Co-operation Unit RAF
- No. 9 Maintenance Unit RAF
- No. 14 Aircraft Acceptance Park
- No. 14 Elementary and Reserve Flying Training School RAF
- No. 14 Elementary Flying Training School RAF
- No. 16 Maintenance Unit RAF
- 25th (Training) Wing
- No. 28 Reserve Squadron
- No. 28 Training Squadron
- No. 38 Squadron RAF
- No. 43 Reserve Squadron
- No. 48 Gliding School RAF
- 49th Aero Squadron
- No. 54 Training Squadron
- No. 55 Training Squadron
- No. 67 Training Squadron
- No. 74 Training Squadron
- No. 577 Squadron RAF
- No. 663 Squadron RAF
- 827 Defence Squadron
- No. 1954 Reserve Air Observation Post Flight RAF
- No. 2827 Squadron RAF Regiment
- Station Flight, Castle Bromwich

== Closure ==
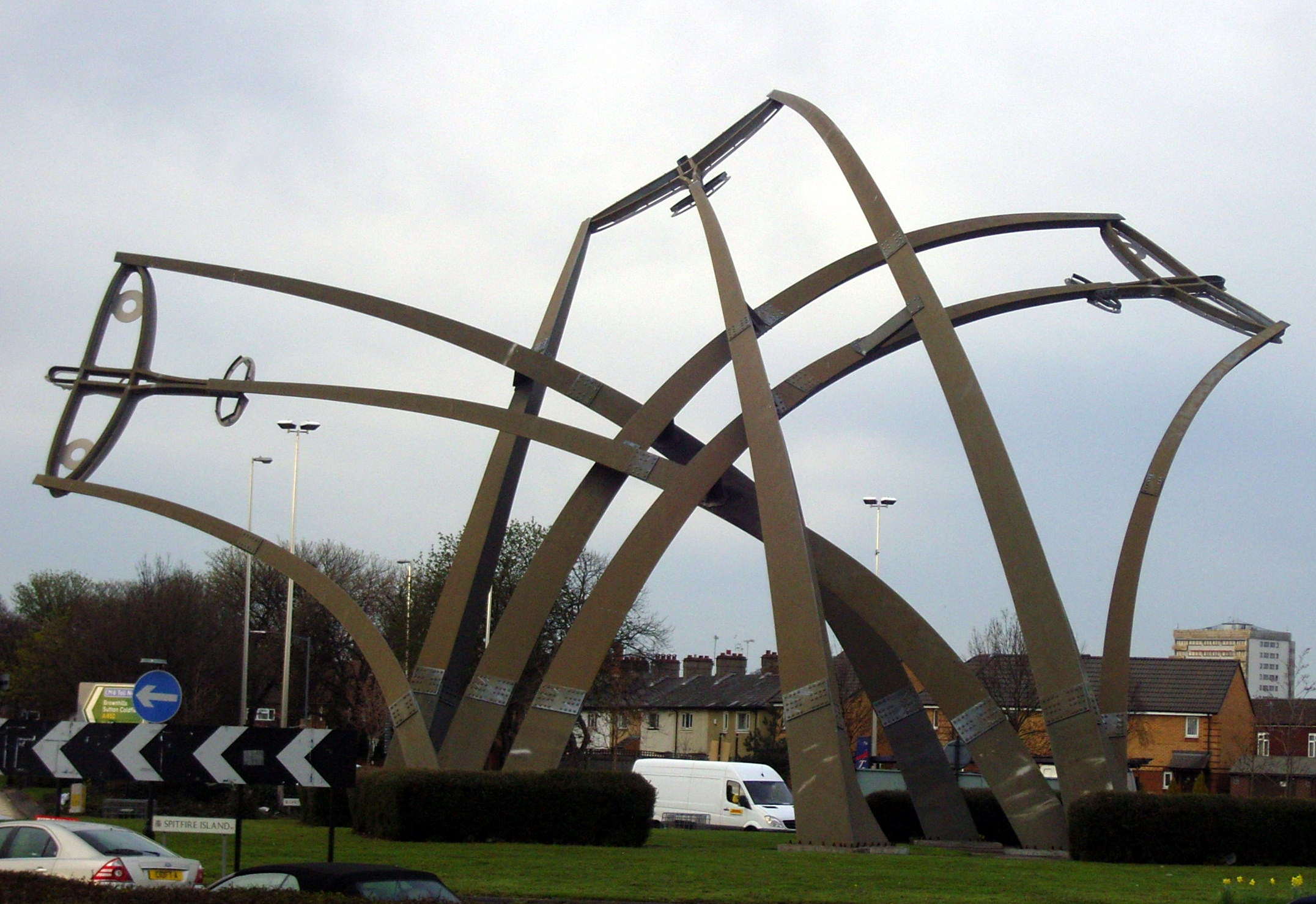
The Sentinel sculpture

The airfield closed in 1958, and in 1960 the site and that of the British Industries Fair, plus nearby farmland, was sold for housing. The runway was broken up, the buildings were demolished, and construction of a Birmingham overspill estate (Castle Vale) started in 1964, and completed in 1969. All that remains today are, a stained glass window in the estate's church, streets and housing blocks with aviation names, a row of ex-RAF houses along the Chester Road, and a Spitfire Memorial. This is a large steel sculpture called Sentinel designed by Tim Tolkien which was erected in 2000 on the roundabout (island) where the road to the estate joins the Chester Road. The roundabout was subsequently renamed Spitfire Island.
