= Norah Wellings =

British toymaker

Norah Wellings (1893 — 1975), British toymaker and designer. Known for her work at Chad Valley Co Ltd and later in her own factory, Victoria Toy Works.

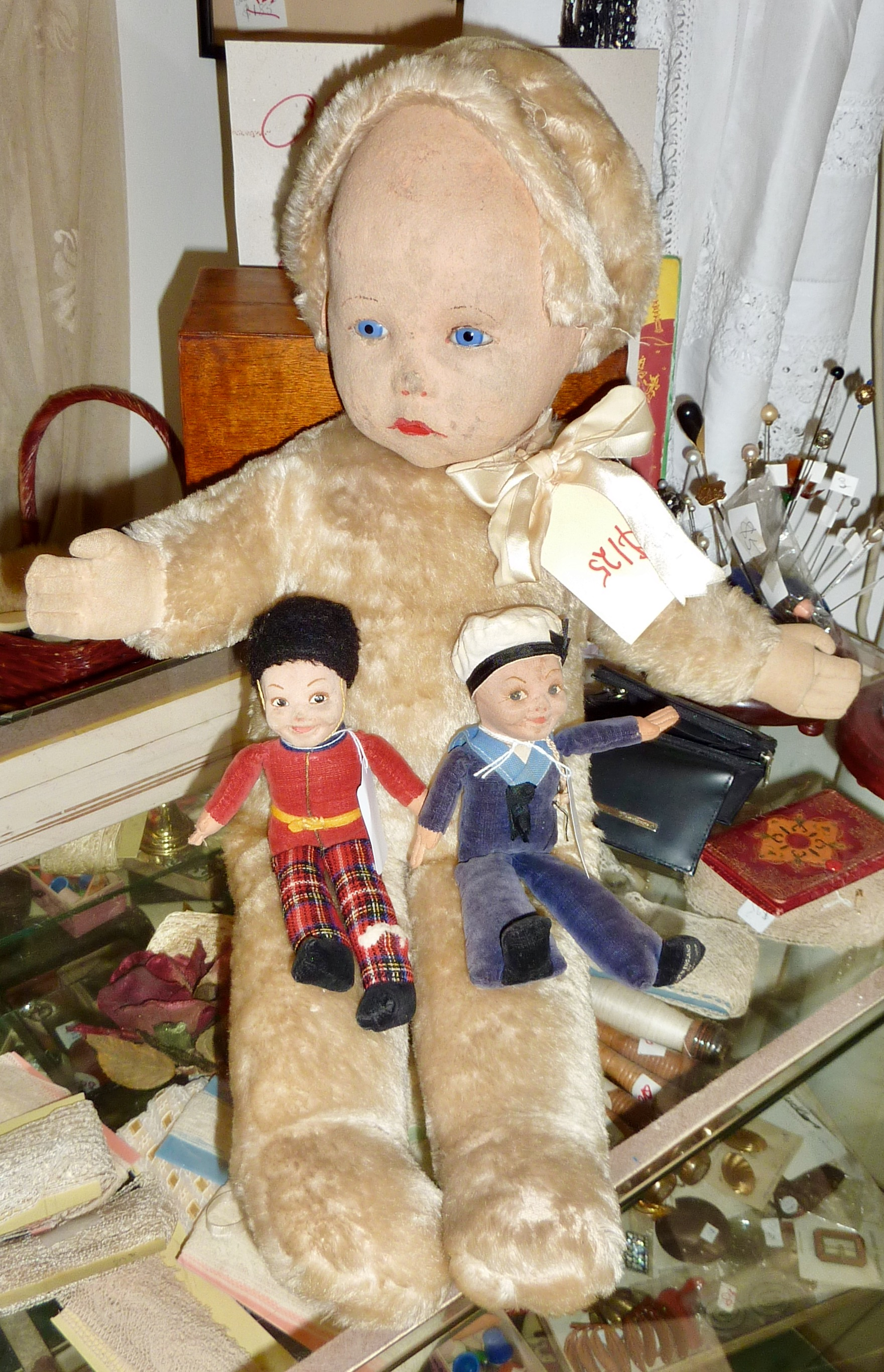
Large Norah Wellings doll and smaller dolls on lap.

== Life and career ==
Norah Wellings was born in 1893 in Shropshire. Her father Thomas was a master plasterer, her mother was named Sarah, and Norah had a brother called Leonard. Norah had a good education and excelled in botany and art.

Norah Wellings started working at Chad Valley Co Ltd in 1919.

In 1926, she established Victoria Toy Works in Wellington, Shropshire, England. The factory had six employees, including some family members. As well as her own brand dolls, Wellings continued to make Chad Valley dolls in similar style. Wellings' dolls are often made of cloth (felt, velvet and velveteen), and represent children and adults, as well as storybook characters. The manufacturing process involved moulding buckram over a layer of plastic wood, overlaid with steamed felt. The faces were then handpainted on, with a waterproof coating to make them washable.

Wellings exhibited at the British Industries Fairs in 1927 and 1929. She was listed as a 'Manufacturer of Soft Fabric Toys of Distinction' and the range included dolls, plush novelties, and mascots.

During World War Two, Wellings made dolls representing characters from the Army, Royal Navy and Royal Air Force, including Harry the Hawk, which was sold to raise money for the Royal Air Force Comforts Fund. She also made a number of 'Jolly Boy' felt sailor figures, which were sold as souvenirs aboard cruise liners.

In 1959, some months after the death of her brother, Leonard, Wellings closed the business, destroyed her designs, tools and unfinished dolls, and retired. She died in February 1975 at the age of 82.
