= Peter Ayerst =

British WWII flying ace

Peter Vigne Ayerst
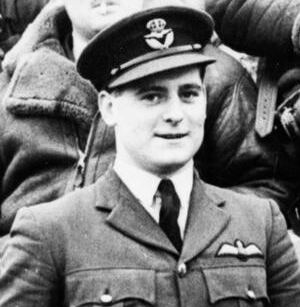
- Ayerst in 1939
- Born: 4 November 1920; Westcliff-on-Sea, Essex
- Died: 15 May 2014 (aged 93)
- Burial place: Canterbury, Kent
- Military career
- Allegiance: United Kingdom
- Branch: Royal Air Force
- Rank: Wing Commander
- Unit: No. 73 Squadron
- Conflicts: Second World War
- Awards: Distinguished Flying Cross

Peter Vigne Ayerst, DFC (4 November 1920 – 15 May 2014) was a Royal Air force officer and flying ace of the Second World War. He was the last surviving No. 73 Squadron pilot and test pilot from Castle Bromwich Aerodrome.

== Early life ==
Peter Vigne Ayerst was born on 4 November 1920 in Westcliff-on-Sea, Essex, England. He was educated at Westcliff High School for Boys, a state grammar school in his home town. He joined the Royal Air Force in 1938 and was granted a short service commission on 14 December 1938 that year as an acting pilot officer on probation. In August 1939, he was posted to No. 73 Squadron to fly Hurricanes.

== Second World War ==
On 24 August 1939, as tensions escalated between Britain and Germany, No. 73 Squadron was mobilised for war. It was intended to send the squadron to France as the Air Component of the British Expeditionary Force (BEF), designated as part of No. 60 Mobile Wing along with No. 1 Squadron. On 8 September 1939, the Second World War now underway, it deployed to France. By this time Ayerst had been regraded to pilot officer on probation and his commission was confirmed on 6 October 1939.

He scored his first victory in April 1940. After a spell instructing, when he shared in the destruction of a Heinkel He 111 medium bomber with two other pilots, he had postings with both Nos. 145 and 243 Squadrons.

In July 1942 he went to North Africa with No. 33 Squadron, before being promoted to flight commander with No. 238 Squadron, both postings with further combat success. After a period in South Africa, he returned to the UK, joining No. 124 Squadron flying Spitfire Mk VIIs in defence of the invasion ports, where he scored his final victory; then flew Spitfire Mk IXs on bomber escorts to Germany. He later became a Spitfire test pilot at Castle Bromwich with the instruction of Alex Henshaw. In November 1944, he was awarded the Distinguished Flying Cross.

Ayerst's final victory tally stood at five aircraft destroyed, two of which were shared with other pilots, one aircraft probably destroyed, three damaged and two further destroyed on the ground. After the war, Ayerst became one of the most highly regarded wartime instructors in the RAF. He was promoted to squadron leader in January 1954.

== Later life ==
Ayerst retired from the RAF in May 1973 as a wing commander.

In later life Ayerst established a company working in the construction sector to deal with the removal of asbestos materials from buildings. He was involved in a biography about his military experience tilted Spirit of the Blue: A Fighter Pilot's Story. It was published 2004. He died on 15 May 2014 at the age of 93, and is buried in Canterbury, Kent.

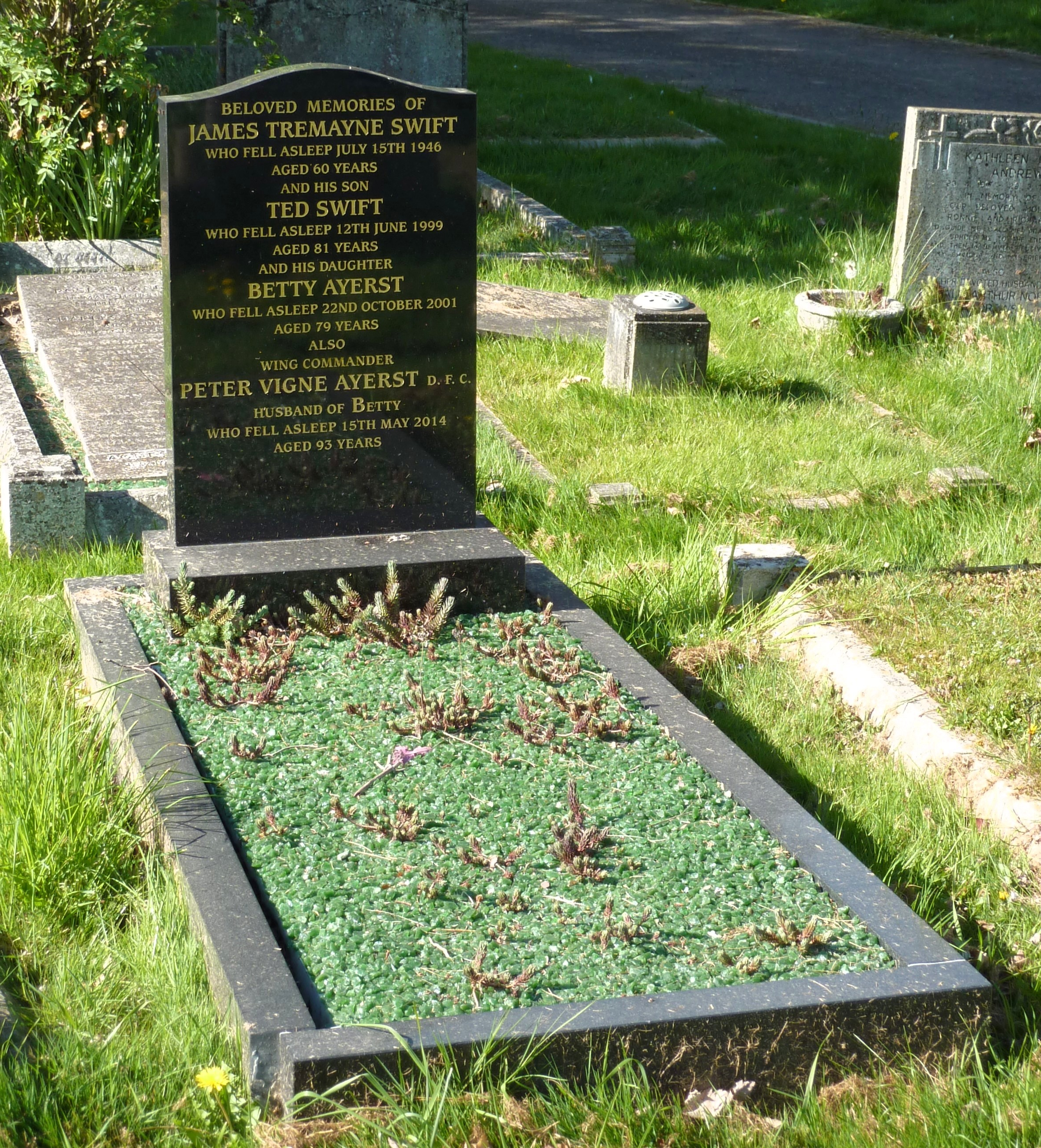
Ayerst's grave at Canterbury City Cemetery in 2017
