= Castle Vale =

Housing estate in West Midlands, England

Coordinates: 52.521085°N 1.784715°W

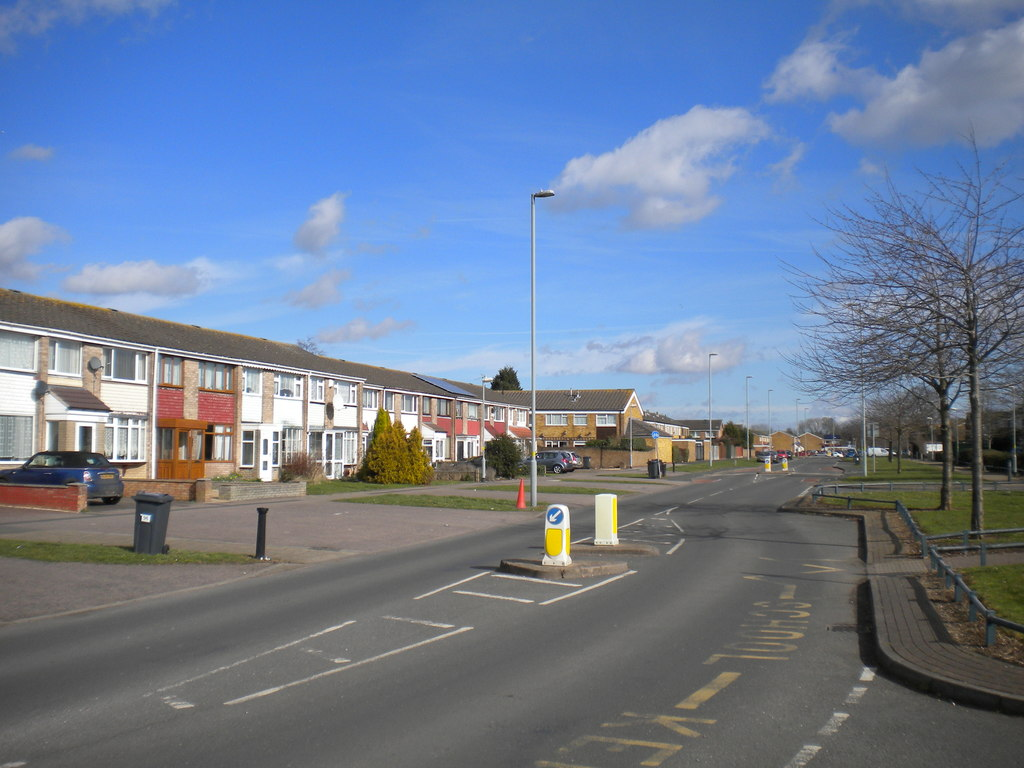
- Turnhouse Road, Castle Vale

- Location within the West Midlands
- Area: 2.5 km^{2} (0.97 sq mi)
- Population: 10,000
  - Density: 4,000/km^{2} (10,000/sq mi)
- OS grid reference: SP147915
- Metropolitan borough: Birmingham
- Metropolitan county: West Midlands
- Region: West Midlands
- Country: England
- Sovereign state: United Kingdom
- Post town: BIRMINGHAM
- Postcode district: B35
- Dialling code: 0121
- Police: West Midlands
- Fire: West Midlands
- Ambulance: West Midlands
- UK Parliament: Birmingham Erdington

Castle Vale is a housing estate located between Erdington, Minworth and Castle Bromwich. Currently Castle Vale makes up the Castle Vale Ward of Birmingham City Council which is part of Erdington constituency (having previously been part of Hodge Hill constituency until recent times), 6 miles (9 km) northeast of Birmingham city centre in England. The area has an approximate population of 10,000 people and has a distinctly modern residential character stemming from its history as a postwar overspill estate.

The area was originally known as Berwood, from the Saxon 'Bearu' meaning 'the woods'. Historically being a boggy and wooded area, the area remained undeveloped for most of its history until the deforestation practices of Edward Darcy in the 17th century and the construction of the Birmingham and Fazeley Canal in the 18th century. In the 20th century, the land became the site for the first aeroplane take-off in Birmingham which led to a long aviation history being associated with the area. Castle Bromwich Aerodrome was established on the site and operated from 1914 to 1960, being a major airfield in both World Wars and also having industrial importance as the testing facility for locally manufactured aeroplanes and the location for the British Industries Fair. Despite being steeped in aviation history, Castle Vale became infamous from the 1970s onwards as a large scale example of a failed postwar overspill estate, which suffered from poor construction and maintenance, social deprivation and high levels of crime. The area became the focus of a targeted regeneration initiative, led by the Castle Vale Housing Action Trust (CVHAT) from 1993 to 2005, where the estate witnessed the demolition of much of its housing stock and facilities, the refurbishment of remaining properties, and the construction of new housing and facilities along with the remodelling of the estate, funded both privately and publicly.

== History ==
=== Origins ===
The site has historically been a wooded area with a post-Domesday manor, although its construction date is not known. In 1160, the Manor of Berwood was given to the Abbey of St. Mary de Pratis at Leicester by the Arden family. A moated house, St Mary's Chapel, a hermitage, a bake house and farm buildings were built for them, although St Mary's Chapel was demolished in the 15th century after it fell into disrepair. Under the ownership of Leicester Abbey, the Arden family became tenants, despite having owned the land previously. In 1356–7, Sir John de Arderne briefly gained ownership of the property but the abbey regained it in 1360. Donations were made by the Arden family to the clergy and in 1244, a donation of land resulted in two priests being sent to the manor to maintain a shrine, pray for Sir William Arden and to assist travellers through the area. During the Dissolution of the Monasteries in 1536, Thomas Arden purchased the property from King Henry VIII for £272 10s. The hall fell into disrepair and when it remained as just a shell, the property was confiscated by the Crown and given to Edward Darcy after the previous owner, Edward Arden, was convicted of treason and hanged. The son of Edward Arden started studying law and commenced several court cases to regain control of the land from Edward Darcy. When Darcy learned of a case to regain half of the land, he deforested it and moved the valuable timber to his land in Minworth, leaving a swampy area which was prone to flooding and with poor quality soil for agriculture. The hall was eventually demolished although the moat still remained into the 20th century. A later house (Berwood Hall) was built outside the moat, which was eventually the site of Berwood Hall Farm. A mill stood in Berwood on Plants Brook in the 15th century.

In 1789, the Birmingham and Fazeley Canal was completed to the north of the area which gradually encouraged an industrial presence along it. In 1881, W. W. Bagot sold 344 acres (1 km^{2}) of land in Berwood to the Birmingham, Tame and Rea District Drainage Board, and a further 358 acres (1 km^{2}) were sold to the Board on 29 September 1888. Home Farm was in the north west corner, near Tyburn House, and the land consisted of a large orchard, however its main function was to spread sewage brought from the City of Birmingham over the rest of the land. In 1898, filter beds were constructed as the volume of sewage was becoming too much with the rest of the land becoming farmland or swamp, surrounded by forest.

In 1842, the Birmingham and Derby Junction Railway was completed to the southeast of Castle Vale with a railway station serving the area on the line. Another railway branch, the Sutton Park Line was completed in 1879 and formed the eastern boundary of the area, roughly marking the boundary of the land in the Arden/Darcy dispute.

In 1900, John Dunlop opened a tyre factory on the opposite side of the Chester Road to where the Castle Vale housing estate now stands and gradually expanded over the next few decades to become one of the largest and most recognisable tyre factories in the world. The name of St. Mary was revived in Berwood upon the construction of the Church of St. Mary to serve people housed in nearby Nissen huts. It was dedicated on 17 December 1923 but was destroyed by fire in 1926, only to be rebuilt soon after and fall into disuse.

=== Castle Bromwich Aerodrome ===
The area was a flat plain when it became the Berwood Playing Fields. In 1909, local mechanic Louis Maxfield assembled a flying machine in Berwood Playing Fields. The plane took off and is said to have reached a height of 50 ft (15 m), making it the first flight in Birmingham. The site's suitability was investigated and it soon became the Castle Bromwich private aerodrome. By 1911, a pilot was giving demonstration flights in a Bleriot monoplane. In the London to Manchester air race of 1914, competitors stopped at the aerodrome for refuelling.

The start of World War I meant a change at Castle Bromwich Aerodrome and it was requisitioned by the War Office for use by the Royal Flying Corps and flying schools in 1915. No. 5 Flying School was established at the aerodrome in the same year. Pilots were accommodated in tents and huts located around the site and on 1 September 1915, 19 Squadron was established at the aerodrome.

In the interwar years, the aerodrome had a dual military and civilian function. In these early days, it was the busiest airport in the area due to its passenger, post and railway air business. A large tract of land adjacent to the airfield was marked out for the British Industries Fair (BIF) in 1920, which was advertised nationally. In 1937, more hangars and a Squadron Headquarters were built for the Royal Air Force and in 1939, it was extended further to become a fighter station, a base for other units and a dispatch site for aeroplanes built at Castle Bromwich Aircraft Factory on the other side of the Chester Road. At its peak, the airfield would be used for testing 300 Supermarine Spitfires per month for World War II.

Various units used the airfield following the war and there was an annual display to mark the anniversary of the Battle of Britain held at the airfield. Civilian flights returned, including the first scheduled helicopter service from London. The buildings that were used for the BIF were sold as storage units for various companies. In March 1960, the airfield was closed as a result of the impending expansion of the airport at Elmdon and in 1962, the airfield site, the BIF site and nearby farmland was sold for construction of the overspill estate which started in 1964. The last hangars were demolished in 1992 for an industrial site.

There are some strong symbolic links to these times in the shape of the Sentinel sculpture, a stained glass church window, and the names of tower blocks and streets on the estate. Remnants of the airfield also exist such as a row of ex-RAF housing along Church Road. It is often said that the three main roads on the estate were the original runways on the airfield, but this is not true. Aerial photographs from the Second World War and afterwards clearly show a triangular runway layout typical of British military airfields of that era, with none of them aligned to the modern day roads.

=== Castle Vale estate ===
==== Planning ====
At the end of World War II, one third of housing within Birmingham was declared unfit for habitation and a major construction programme was needed to deal with the problem. By 1950, Birmingham City Council had been constructing municipal housing to accommodate the rising population of Birmingham and to accommodate those who had been displaced by the slum clearances in the inner-city areas of the city, similar to the process which had started some 30 years earlier when the first council houses were built. Municipal house construction developed into high-rise construction in the mid-1950s with the guidance of Alwyn Sheppard Fidler, the City Architect of Birmingham. By 1962, however, the city council was demolishing more houses than it was constructing and Fidler urged the council to adopt the French Camus system which consisted of housing at a density of approximately 50 houses per hectare and 80 people per acre. The council refused this and demanded 48 homes per hectare with 75 people per acre. In a final attempt to convince the council, he proposed a 'garden city' layout for the Castle Bromwich Airfield site in 1963. This too was rejected and, as a result, Fidler resigned from his position. He was quickly succeeded by J. R. Sheridan-Shedden, the deputy City Architect who held the position temporarily. Upon taking the position, he designed a revised masterplan for the Castle Bromwich Airfield estate. The new masterplan used the Radburn Layout which consisted of super-blocks of housing, schools, retail and offices around a communal open space, a concept which was created by Clarence Stein in Radburn, New Jersey in 1929.

The council attempted to limit the damage caused to their reputation as a result of the scandal surrounding the resignation of Fidler by agreeing to embark on the major building project at Castle Bromwich with five new goals. These were increasing housing output at the estate by a further 4,000 homes, which was aimed to reduce the cost of dwellings, introducing industrialised forms of construction to save labour, attracting new national contractors to work in Birmingham, and increase capacity by providing continuous work for contractors.

==== Construction ====
At a time when major housebuilding firms were receiving large subsidies from the Government for the construction and pioneering prefabricated, system-built tower blocks, there was major competition between companies who offered various construction systems. Concrete Ltd. had developed a system called the Bison Wall Frame system which was offered to the council who then accepted it and commissioned Bryants as the contractor.

Construction of the layout designed by J. R. Sheridan-Shedden, which consisted of housing for 5,000 housing units along two spines of housing running along the length of the estate, commenced in 1963 and the first residents moved in a year later. The estate was completed in 1969. Reinforced concrete was the main material used due to its low cost and ease of use. 30% of the houses constructed were intended for private sale, an unusually high percentage, with most of the privately sold houses being around the Park Lane area of the estate. As well as residential properties, there was also a shopping centre in the eastern part of the estate, five schools, two churches and a swimming pool. There were some clear links to the aviation heritage of the site within the names of the roads, with the three main roads running the length of the estate being constructed on the runways of the airfield, and the 34 tower blocks that contained 2,000 flats. There were two major concentrations of tower blocks within the estate: fourteen along Farnborough Road, and the 'Centre 8', a group of eight large tower blocks in the centre of the estate. The following is a list of the tower blocks constructed on the estate.

Name	Location	Number of flats	Number of floors	Additional notes	References
Abingdon Tower	Yatesbury Avenue	92	16	One of the 'Centre 8' tower blocks.	
Albert Shaw House	Longcroft Close	60	16	Built next to the main shopping centre.	
Andover House	Padgate Close	42	12		
Argosy House	Farnborough Road	42	12		
Auster House	Farnborough Road	42	12		
Avro House	Farnborough Road	42	12		
Bovingdon Tower	Yatesbury Avenue	92	16	One of the 'Centre 8' tower blocks.	
Chivenor House	Drem Croft	42	12	Built on top of Chivenor Primary School. Still standing.	
Comet House	Farnborough Road	41	12		
Concorde Tower	Hawker Drive	116	20	The tallest tower on the estate.	
Cosford Tower	Yatesbury Avenue	92	16	One of the 'Centre 8' tower blocks.	
Cranwell Tower	Yatesbury Avenue	92	16	One of the 'Centre 8' tower blocks.	
Ensign House	Donibristle Croft	50	13		
Hampden House	Farnborough Road	41	12		
Hawker House	Farnborough Road	41	12		
Hercules House	Rawlins Croft	42	12		
Hermes House	Innsworth Drive	50	13		
Javelin House	Farnborough Road	42	12		
Kemble Tower	Yatesbury Avenue	92	16	One of the 'Centre 8' tower blocks.	
Kestrel House	Farnborough Road	42	12		
Lyneham Tower	Yatesbury Avenue	92	16	One of the 'Centre 8' tower blocks.	
Lysander House	Farnborough Road	42	12		
Meteor House	Filton Croft	50	13		
Northolt Tower	Yatesbury Avenue	92	16	One of the 'Centre 8' tower blocks.	
Oakington House	Watton Green	42	12		
Pioneer House	Farnborough Road	41	12		
Shawbury Tower	Yatesbury Avenue	92	16	One of the 'Centre 8' tower blocks.	
Ternhill House	Drem Croft	42	12		
Topcliffe House	Hawkinge Drive	42	12	Built on top of Topcliffe Primary School. Still standing.	
Trident House	Farnborough Road	42	12		
Valiant House	Manby Road	50	13		
Vanguard House	Farnborough Road	42	12		
Viscount House	Farnborough Road	41	12		
Vulcan House	Farnborough Road	42	12		

The first residents moved into their new homes in 1964. Many of the new residents were of Irish descent, previously living in inner-city slums such as Aston and Nechells. By the end of the 1960s, Castle Vale had a population of around 20,000 people. As well as high-rise tower blocks, Castle Vale had 27 four-storey blocks of maisonettes, three-storey blocks of flats, over 100 bungalows and hundreds of terraced and semi-detached houses. All the houses had modern features that the houses of the slums lacked such as electricity, indoor toilets and central heating. Many of the houses also had gardens to the front and rear, while most of the flats in the tower blocks had private balconies.

A competition for the name of the estate was held early in the estate's development and the chosen name was Castle Vale, submitted by a local schoolgirl.

==== Decline ====
When residents moved into their new homes, most were pleased with the improvement. However, the demolition of the slums and breaking up of entire communities had made people feel unsettled. The modern features meant that residents had to adapt, for example, residents were now paying for underfloor heating when they were used to cheaper coal fires. Many residents began to resent being moved and became unhappy.

Socially, the estate failed to develop into a community and the residents were in poor economic situations. The start of the decline of the estate began in the 1970s when crime rates started to increase. Rent payments were initially collected by the 'rent man' who went from door-to-door, but muggings meant the service was withdrawn in the mid to late-1970s and rent had to be paid at the local post office in the shopping centre. Drug dealing also started becoming prominent in the late-1970s, with violent incidents also increasing in number. The problems continued into the 1980s with the top of Concorde Tower becoming a popular vantage point for teenagers to watch joyriders speed along the straight main roads (often in stolen cars), and to watch the police chase them. Castle Vale had six pubs, (Trade Winds, Albatross, Trees, Skylark, Artful Dodger and Lancaster), but all had closed by 1996, having been associated with drug dealing for a long time.

The economic downturns of the 1970s and 1980s saw the local manufacturing industry hit hard and unemployment on Castle Vale soared. By the late 1980s, unemployment on the estate stood at around 28% – around four times the national average at the time.

West Midlands Police struggled to operate on the estate due to recurring incidents and also incidents where officers were attacked by youths. The lack of law enforcement led to the residents feeling intimidated and helpless on the estate. In the 1980s, the police tried an alternative approach called Community Policing where hot spots for crime were tackled with more officers. The scheme received national attention but was considered to not be drastic enough to deal with the problems on the estate. By 1992, 41% of residents said they were victims of crime and 55% said they were afraid to go out at night.

The economic situation for most residents declined through the 1980s, with many of the original residents already coming from poor economic backgrounds in slums. The Birmingham Municipal Bank opened a branch in Castle Vale Shopping Centre but the last bank closed in 1987, leading to a greater reliance on illegal loan sharks. Additionally, the unemployment rate was on average 50% higher than the city average by 1992, and in some pockets of the estate, the unemployment rate was 40%. This was one of the highest levels in the country, which was in the depths of a major recession at the time, and unemployment had even continued to plague Castle Vale following the previous recession in the early 1980s after which the national unemployment level had halved within three years.

Educational attainment also suffered with 12% of Castle Vale Secondary School leavers received 5 or more A*-C grades at GCSE, half the city average. Only 8% continued into further education, compared with 55% for the rest of Birmingham. The schools themselves had unsustainably low student numbers and they found it difficult to persuade teachers to continue working in the area, as well as employing new teachers.

There were also physical problems with the estate. While the design and layout had exacerbated some of the problems such as crime, there were also issues with the quality of construction of the buildings. The design of the estate was based around three main roads – Farnborough Road, Tangmere Drive and Yatesbury Avenue – which were wide and straight, lending themselves to joyriders. Many pockets of the estate were hidden from view allowing muggings to take place, as well as drug dealing and drug taking. They became litter traps and fly-tipping could occur with ease. The design of individual buildings was also of concern, with a wide range of issues such as the ease of access for arsonists to the rubbish chutes of the maisonettes, which posed a safety hazard to residents. Issues regarding the construction of the buildings were noticed early into the estate's life. In the early 1970s, many homes were starting to experience damp and others were flooded as a result of leaking roofs. In the maisonettes, heating bills were between £300–500 quarterly and the homes remained cold in the winter. These issues regarding the construction were not confined to just the estate, but most other estates constructed in the Bison construction system. Birmingham City Council was eventually depleted of funds for the maintenance of the blocks and lift breakdowns became common, and were further aggravated by repairers refusing to work without security enforcement. They were also reports of teenage troublemakers setting fire to the staircases in the tower blocks. In 1991, a large concrete panel fell from one of the tower blocks and, although nobody was injured, it was reported locally and helped spark efforts for the regeneration of the estate to begin.

== Regeneration ==
=== Establishing the Housing Action Trust ===
The state of Castle Vale became a serious concern for Birmingham City Council and in July 1991, Derek Waddington, the then director of housing for Birmingham City Council, heard about a Housing Action Trust in North Hull. After further research, he recommended this to Dick Knowles, then leader of Birmingham City Council, for Castle Vale. He produced a presentation to the council in Autumn 1991 to convince the council of the potential of the scheme. The following day, the council approached the department for the Environment, the predecessor to the Department for Communities and Local Government, on how to approach the establishment of a Housing Action Trust at Castle Vale. In December 1991, Michael Heseltine announced to Parliament that Castle Vale had become the latest candidate for Housing Action Trust status. In 1992, Richard Temple Cox, a local architect, was appointed shadow chairman for the Housing Action Trust and was given the job of persuading residents on the estate to vote in favour of establishing the HAT. He entered negotiations with a Community Action Team, which had been established for the estate in 1992, to determine the size and composition of the board for the HAT. They agreed on a board of twelve members, with four resident representatives, three local authority councillors, and five independent members.

Following campaigning by the council to convince residents to vote in favour of the HAT, a ballot date of 18 March 1993 was announced. The ballot had a resident turnout of 74%, and the results were announced on 15 April 1993 with 92% voting in favour of the HAT. Castle Vale Housing Action Trust was formally established on 30 June 1993 and Angus Kennedy was appointed as Chief executive and the first permanent board member on 23 November 1993. The Housing Action Trust, locally known as "The HAT", was given a 12-year objective to regenerate the estate using both publicly and privately funded means. On 31 March 1994, 3,746 homes housing approximately 11,000 people in an area covering approximately 2.5 km^{2} (1 sq mi) was transferred to the HAT from Birmingham City Council.

=== Masterplanning ===
In April 1994, Hunt Thompson Associates were appointed by the HAT as master planners and work on the plan commenced in the following month. The master planners conducted an in-depth survey and public consultations with residents and local businesses over a six-month period to establish the issues within the estate and their causes. A draft masterplan followed by a refined document were sent to Birmingham City Council for their consideration.

These plans, to be carried out for up to 12 years while the HAT was in existence, were for the demolition of 1,416 homes including 17 of the 34 tower blocks and 24 of the 27 maisonette blocks. Of the tower blocks proposed for demolition were the Centre 8 blocks, four tower blocks on the northern section of the estate, one tower block which stood atop the main shopping centre (also earmarked for demolition) and four more tower blocks on the southern part of the estate. Up to 1,100 homes were to be constructed on the sites released by demolition. The remaining tower blocks which included the fourteen on Farnborough Road and Concorde Tower were to be refurbished with new insulation and security features. The other low-rise residential properties were also to be refurbished in Neighbourhood Strategies. Economic proposals included the large-scale redevelopment of Castle Vale Shopping Centre to create a modern hub for the community and for new offices to be constructed for the community organisations. Plans for an upgrade of the medical services were already advancing when the masterplan was being produced.

The plans were later adjusted during demolition and recommended the demolition of 32 of 34 tower blocks, with the remaining two being refurbished. They were saved from demolition as they were constructed as part of a complex with primary schools and the demolition of the towers would necessitate the demolition of the schools, which the HAT and Birmingham City Council wanted to avoid. To regenerate the shopping area in the centre of the estate, Associated Architects and Gillespies were appointed to produce a masterplan for the site to include new shopping facilities and other community facilities.

=== Demolition and construction ===
==== Environmental and housing schemes ====
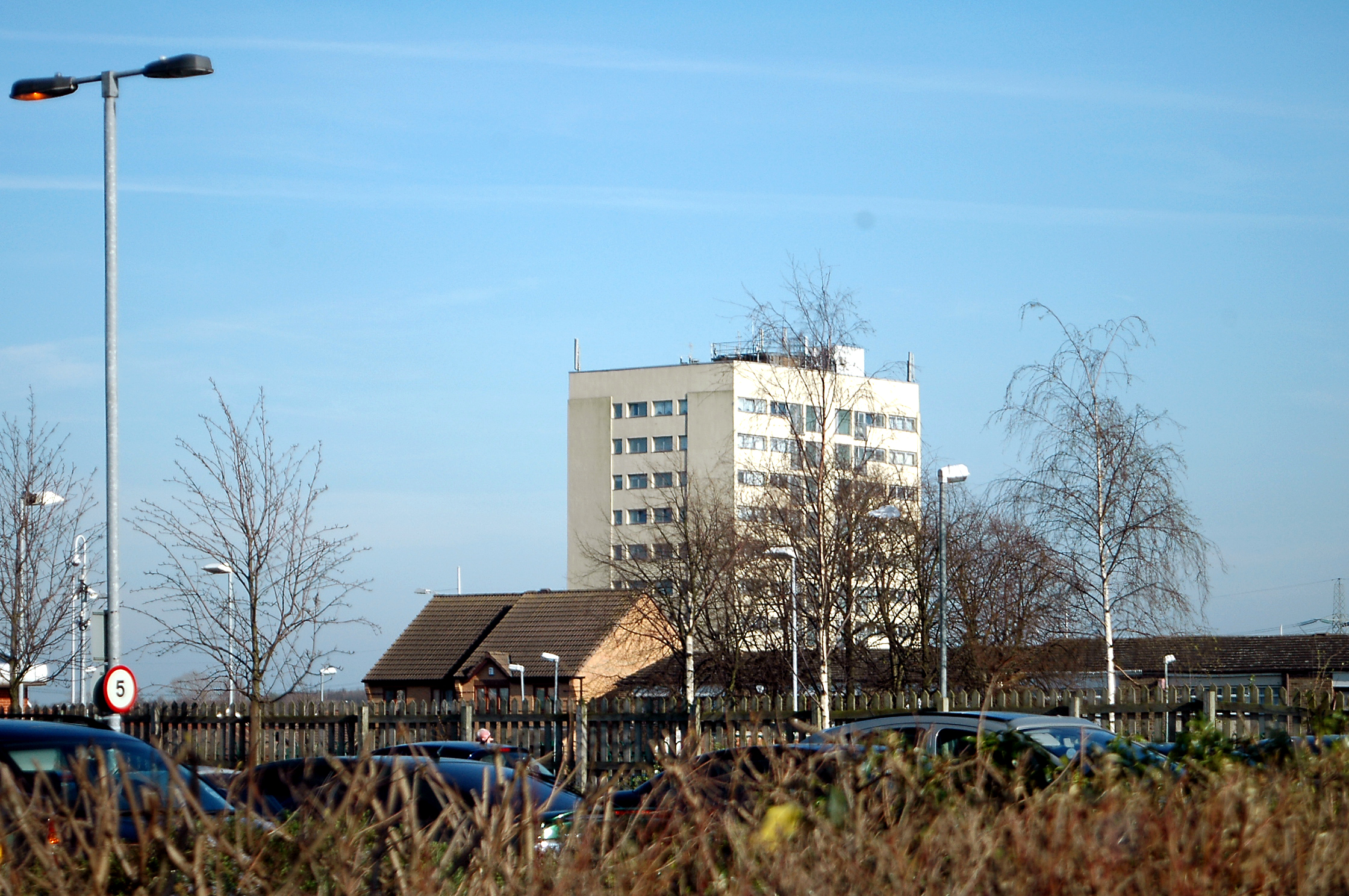
Chivenor House as viewed from Castle Vale Retail Park.

Preparations for the demolition of properties commenced as soon as the masterplan was approved. The first phase of preparations for demolition began in June 1995 when the first four of the "Centre 8" blocks were demolished. The other four blocks in this section were demolished a year later. The four "bison wall" tower blocks - Valiant, Meteor, Hermes and Ensign Houses - were demolished in 1997, along with Albert Shaw House. The decision was then made to demolish Concorde Tower as well as the 14 Farnborough Road tower blocks, which had originally been earmarked for refurbishment. During the clearance process, security were employed to guard the site constantly to protect remaining residents and to prevent looting. All 27 of the maisonette blocks were eventually demolished, including the three which were initially earmarked for refurbishment. All but one of the Farnborough Road tower blocks had been demolished by the end of 2000, with Vulcan House initially being retained as accommodation for doctors and nurses while improvements took place at NHS staff homes near to Heartlands Hospital. However, Vulcan House was significantly under-occupied for this purpose, and it was finally demolished in 2002. Andover, Hercules, Ternhill and Oakington Houses were demolished afterwards.

By 2004, all remaining tower blocks, with the exception of Chivenor and Topcliffe House, had been demolished along with the remaining maisonette blocks and an additional 114 bungalows. Both of the surviving tower blocks were incorporated into neighbouring schools, and were earmarked for retention from the outset, as their demolition would have resulted in the need to build replacement schools elsewhere in the local area.

Demolition work was conducted by demolition contractors who competed for the various contracts offered by the HAT. The complexity of these contracts led to confusion sometimes between the contractors and the HAT. In one case, between the HAT and Demolition Services Ltd., where Demolition Services Ltd. had been contracted to demolish two 13-storey tower blocks and remove asbestos from the insulation panels, legal advice was sought by the contractor after they discovered further asbestos in the finishes to the ceilings, walls and floors. Demolition Services Ltd. wanted an additional payment of £300,000 but the HAT argued that the removal of these features were part of the contract. Nonetheless, the HAT were forced to make the additional payment in court.

For some residents who had been moved out of their homes, temporary accommodation was provided in a process known as 'decanting'. On the day of moving, the HAT provided removal services for them and also gave them £800 on the day to cover any costs and for the inconvenience. Properties that were used for decanting were usually temporarily refurbished prior to residents moving in and were located on the estate itself.

The demolition of these properties opened up vast tracts of land for the HAT and plans were drawn up with various architects and contractors to develop these sites, mainly for residential purposes to house the displaced families. Significant focus was placed on the quality of design and the use of low-energy features to make the estate more sustainable. New roads were constructed on the sites of the demolished tower blocks and often took the names of them, such as Avro Way, Lysander Boulevard and Trident Boulevard.

Axis Design Collective became involved in the regeneration of the estate from 1995, being involved in the consultation of the design of new-build residential properties. They first worked on the Neighbourhood Strategy for the area surrounding Sopwith Croft between 1995 and 1996. This led to their involvement in the design of 42 rented homes in the Sopwith Croft area which were built from 1998 to 2000. During the same period, 33 infill homes and bungalows were constructed on Neville Walk and Chigwell Close, as well as a bungalow development aimed at disabled people on Howes Croft which was completed in 1999. Later on, Axis were also involved in the design of a low-energy courtyard development with 21 bungalows on Tangmere Drive and Drem Croft, and also with the design of 22 rented family homes on Bond Drive in 2000. Their final work in Castle Vale was related to the construction of 42 houses and flats in phase 2 of the scheme to redevelop the site of Concorde Tower in 2000. In total, Axis designed 200 new properties in Castle Vale.

In the Watton Green area of the estate, eleven houses were completed in February 2001 with a focus on low-energy features. Designed by PCKO Architects and built by Focus Housing Group, they broke the trend of new homes constructed entirely of brick on the estate. The shells of these buildings were constructed quickly with insulated wall panels and roof pieces, manufactured using recycled newspaper and containing no foam or resin. The internal walls are not load-bearing, allowing changes to the plans of the buildings in the future. The buildings are clad in cedar cladding and Tresca panels. For water conservation, low flush toilets, aerated taps and water butts were installed. Altogether, the scheme cost £958,000, with an average unit cost of £87,000.

Refurbishment projects were carried out on the remaining tower blocks and three-storey blocks of flats. The first of the refurbishments of the two tower blocks commenced in 2002 with Chivenor House. A subtle refurbishment was planned with the entire exterior being covered in an insulated render and painted a cream colour. The ground floor and basement were refurbished providing communal facilities for the local residents including a hairdressing salon, communal lounge, communal kitchen and television room. A concierge was located on the ground floor to ensure security of access and part of the basement was linked to the school. A crèche was also provided. The stairwells were reglazed with Reglit glazing and new windows were provided in powder-coated aluminium frames, which were of better quality than the previous window frames. The refurbishment was completed in 2006 at a cost of £3 million. The refurbishment of Topcliffe House commenced in November 2003 as the final refurbishment project by the HAT in the area. A design competition was held for a high-profile design for the building with BM3 Architecture, the architects of the Chivenor House refurbishment, winning the competition. Metal balconies and brightly coloured louvres were installed on the building to radically change the exterior. The crown of the building is surrounded by metal panels similar to those used on the balconies with the name 'Topcliffe' etched into it. These panels shield the antennas on the roof from view. The refurbishment was completed in May 2005 at a cost of £2.7 million.

Farnborough Road and the immediate area became a hive of construction activity in CVHAT's existence. A self-build scheme was pioneered here by Birmingham Co-operative Housing Services and Accord Housing Association. Starting in May 2008, the scheme involved the construction of 14 mock-Tudor style homes by their future tenants. At the project's outset, those involved in the construction of the buildings were unemployed but had gained full-time jobs by the project's completion. Another construction project was Farnborough Road children's home, the first children's home in the city for 20 years. The eight-bed centre was constructed as a result of a partnership between Birmingham's Social Services Department, CVHAT, Walker Troup Architects, and design and build contractor Lovell Partnerships. The children's home was part of a larger housing scheme by Lovell Partnerships and designed by Walker Troup Architects which proved to be the last large-scale residential construction project for the HAT. The scheme consisted of 237 homes, of which, 211 were for rent and 26 were offered for sale in the scheme which cost £22.7 million. Construction commenced in October 2002.

By 2000, 1,500 properties had been demolished while 700 new homes had been constructed and a further 786 had been refurbished. In March 2000, CVHAT owned 1,587 properties while housing associations owned 610 and 1,456 were owner-occupied. In 2001, Ron Hull Demolition were appointed for the remainder of the demolition work on the estate. By 2002, the HAT had constructed 1,486 new properties and reinstated 2,262 displaced households in the newly constructed or refurbished properties.

==== Commercial and employment schemes ====
Although there was a major focus on improving the housing stock on the estate, CVHAT had to tackle the other facilities and a major priority was the redevelopment of Castle Vale Shopping Centre. In 1996, Sainsbury's were invited to tender for the redevelopment of the shopping centre, which they won. The company commenced a period of consultation with the community and produced a planning application for the construction of a retail park on the site with 700 car parking spaces. Schal, the construction management company of Carillion, were appointed as contractors for the scheme. The first phase to be constructed was an office and retail block which became occupied by the CVHAT and a dentist's surgery. Construction of the rest of the retail park was completed in July 2000, with the Sainsbury's supermarket store opened on 29 July 2000. The demolition of the shopping centre and Concorde Tower resulted in 11,000 tonnes of concrete rubble, which was reused in the construction phase with the surplus being given to Project Wagtail. Schal consulted the community to distinguish how to minimise disruption on the estate, leading to the relocation of a bus-stop, the use of vibro-piling over rapid piling and also improvements to footpaths in the general area. Carillion Craft Training were brought in to employ residents on the estate to work on the construction to help tackle the unemployment rate. The opening of the Sainsbury's supermarket in the 64,000 sq ft (5,946 m^{2}) anchor unit and 84,000 sq ft (7,804 m^{2}) of non-food retail units, which are fully occupied by Comet, T.K. Maxx, Argos and ScS, led to the creation of approximately 600 jobs. Initially, 38% of those working at the retail park were local residents, but this figure increased to 95% within five years. Sainsbury's then worked closely with the community to help support the local radio station and football team. In total, the project cost £35 million.

Another shopping area identified as needing significant redevelopment was Reed Square in the centre of the estate. Associated Architects and Gillespies were appointed as master planners and an outline planning application was approved in August 2002. Associated Architects were appointed for the design of buildings on the site including an educational complex named C3, a West Midlands Police sector base, and a new retail and office block. Planning consent for these were obtained in 2003 and 2004. The first phase of the scheme regarded implementation of infrastructural improvements for the area, such as the construction of Castle Vale High Street and a public square around St. Cuthbert's Church. Bluestone plc were appointed as contractors for this phase following a competitive tender process. This phase was completed in November 2004, along with the retail and office units. The police sector base was completed in October 2004. The estimated total cost of the scheme is £26 million, with funding coming from the European Regional Development Fund, the Learning and Skills Council, Birmingham City Council, the Home Office and Castle Vale Community Housing Association.

Further employment opportunities for the estate were provided through the construction of Enterprise Park in the east of the estate, on the site of the last remaining hangars for the airfield at Park Lane. Completed in April 2000 to a design by David Rowbotham Ltd., the business park provided 44 small to medium business units on a 3.64-acre (14,700 m^{2}) site. Construction commenced in February 1999 with Galliford Midlands appointed as the contractor. The project cost £3.364 million, with funding coming from Advantage West Midlands, Castle Vale HAT, Ashtenne plc and the European Regional Development Fund. The park was completed ahead of schedule and officially opened by Alex Stephenson, chairman of Advantage West Midlands, in June 2000. Following its completion, approximately 200 jobs have been created.

==== Crime reduction ====
Crime was one of the significant issues affecting the residents of the estate and various initiatives were employed by CVHAT to reduce crime rates. Despite these measures, crime rose on the estate until near the end of the HAT's existence. Initially, crime reduction measures were fragmented and poorly implemented. The establishment of ValeWatch in June 1997, a partnership between West Midlands Police and CVHAT which organised monthly meetings where intelligence on offenders was shared, brought about a more co-ordinated approach to tackling crime. In 1998, a series of Community Safety Forums were held which were public events for the residents where they could express concerns that they had. These meetings were attended by approximately 200 people. Working groups, which consisted of residents, CVHAT staff and agency representatives, were set up as a result of the forums to tackle specific issues affecting the estate. One working group focussed on the use of CCTV on the estate to improve surveillance on troublespots. The HAT submitted a bid for £450,000 to the Government's Crime Reduction Programme which led to the installation of 29 new CCTV cameras.

ValeWatch also allowed the HAT to tackle the source of crime in the estate and, in 1998, evicted the ringleaders of the Green Box Gang, which was small, notorious gang consisting mainly of teenage troublemakers. These were the first evictees from the estate. In Autumn 2000, CVHAT sought the eviction of five families who were accused of persistently breaking their tenancy conditions. This was considered to be a landmark case as it used a multi-trial approach where all five families could be tried at once, saving the HAT time and money. A further 20 families were given Notices of Seeking Possession during 2000, and the HAT collated evidence and built cases against the families. During this time, some of the families improved their behaviour while others left the estate. Those that were taken to court saw cases that involved 112 witness statements, supported by covert surveillance footage in some instances.

A major problem on the estate in the past was the presence of joyriders exploiting the straight main roads that ran the length of the estate. To tackle this, the HAT employed a traffic calming scheme in April 1998. This was done by installing speed bumps, mini-roundabouts and narrowing road lanes. An issue for residents was securing their property from thieves and so the HAT provided burglar alarms and car steering locks. In February 1999, 59 Home Wardens were introduced to the estate to help protect property and forge links between residents and community groups. As they had no law enforcement powers, funding was provided for two extra police officers for three years. A centre was also set up for dealing with any reports of racial harassment on the estate.

==== Results ====
The regeneration of the estate has led to noticeable successes and all the key objectives were met. While the physical changes to the profile of Castle Vale were the most noticeable, there were significant improvements to the overall health, economic situation, social lives and educational attainment of estate residents, as well as reductions in crime rates. Some improvements were progressive with regeneration of the estate, while others became apparent at the end of CVHAT's existence.

In 1992, the Health Needs Assessment stated that the average life expectancy of Castle Vale residents was 68.3 years, compared to the national average of 75.9 years. Between 1992 and 2005, the average life expectancy in Castle Vale rose by approximately seven years. This was the result of measures to tackle drug and alcohol abuse on the estate as well as improving the quality of life. Residents became more house proud and so kept their houses cleaner, reducing the risk of infections. People were also more willing to visit the newly constructed Health Village on Tangmere Drive.

The lack of employment opportunities had led to a high unemployment rate and a dependence on loan sharks amongst residents on the estate. The construction of the Enterprise Park and two shopping centres provided new employment opportunities to hundreds of people. Merlin Venture was created to provide employment opportunities to residents in a variety of sectors. Unemployment on the estate has dropped from 26% in 1993, to 5.6% in October 2004. The Castle Vale Credit Union was approved by the Registrar of Friendly Societies in September 1998, offering saving services and cheap loans. By June 2004, it had 640 members. Despite this, there are still high levels of poverty and a survey in 2004 found that 39% of respondents earned between £5,000 and £10,000, with nearly a third earning less than £5,000. In 2004, the estate remained just outside the top 10% most deprived areas in England.

Crime rates remained largely unaffected in Castle Vale until towards the end of the HAT's existence. Crime rates began to fall in 2001, and between 2000 and 2004, the number of crimes committed in Castle Vale reduced by 36%, although the fear of crime still remained high amongst residents. West Midlands Police has launched a series of initiatives aimed at tackling specific causes of crime on the estate. They are also assisted by five Neighbourhood Wardens, who have no powers for arrest or enforcement but act as intermediaries between the police and community.

Castle Vale Housing Action Trust was dissolved on 31 March 2005, and all its assets were passed on to English Partnerships. It was succeeded by numerous organisations to maintain the work of the HAT. During the HAT's lifetime, it demolished 2,275 homes, refurbished 1,333 homes and constructed 1,464 homes. 1,461 jobs were created and 3,415 training places were created. It received £197.5 million of Government funding and £102.7 million of private funding and additional leverage. It had won awards from the Government and Birmingham Civic Society.

Traffic calming strategies were put in place by the HAT, but it took the tragic death of Callum Henry in September 2011 before Castle Vale had its first zebra crossing constructed. This was the result of the reaction of Castle Vale residents, work by local councillors, the Road Safety Group, and a petition delivered to Birmingham City Council, received as one of the largest they had ever received.

== Education ==
To serve the needs of the community in the 1960s, five schools were constructed on the estate; four primary schools and one secondary school. These schools continue to operate, despite past instances of poor student numbers.

=== Primary schools ===
Chivenor Junior and Infant School is a co-educational primary school constructed during the 1960s. As Birmingham City Council was not willing to demolish the primary school during the regeneration of the estate in the 1990s, the Chivenor House tower block constructed above the primary school was saved from demolition and refurbished. Upon the last OFSTED inspection of the school in February 2007, there were approximately 330 pupils and the headteacher was S. Holloway. The pupil population of the school was found to be mostly British White with one fifth of pupils being of an ethnic minority. Those requiring free school meals was "exceptionally high".

Pegasus Primary School is a co-educational primary school constructed during the 1960s, and is located on Turnhouse Drive in the northeast of the estate. Upon the last OFSTED inspection of the school in November 2007, there were 181 pupils on roll and the headteacher was Robert Lee. It was inspected on 4 October 2006 and was given a Notice to Improve. Between these two inspections, there was significant staff turnover and the 2007 inspection found that sufficient steps had been taken to improve the school and that an additional Notice to Improve was not needed. The primary school's pupil population is mostly British White and an "above average" proportion are entitled to free school meals, as is the proportion of pupils identified as having learning difficulties or disabilities.

St Gerard's RC Junior and Infant School is a voluntary aided co-educational primary school with Roman Catholic denomination, constructed during the 1960s along with the rest of the housing estate. It is located on Yatesbury Avenue in the north of the estate, adjacent to St Gerard's Church. The school has a nursery which, in 2008, for the first time, accepted children in the early stages of learning English. The school accepts pupil from the local area and diocese. Upon the last OFSTED inspection of the school in May 2008, there were approximately 220 pupils on roll and the headteacher was David Hird. One quarter of children were from ethnic minorities with the rest being British White. The proportion of pupils with learning difficulties or disabilities was below average, however the proportion of pupils eligible for free school meals was above average.

Topcliffe Primary School is a co-educational primary school constructed along with the rest of the estate during the 1960s. It is located on Hawkinge Drive in the northwest of the estate. Like Chivenor Junior and Infant School, the primary school was constructed on the side of a tower block named Topcliffe House, and during the regeneration of the estate in the 1990s, Birmingham City Council were unwilling to demolish the primary school and so retained the tower block and refurbished it. Upon the last OFSTED inspection of the school in June 2007, there were approximately 250 pupils and the headteacher was Chris Robinson, although Ian Lowe now holds this position with Chris Robinson holding the Deputy Headteacher position. The school has provision for children with special educational needs as a result of the fact that the attainment of pupils when they enter the school at the age of 4 is below average. For pupils who have speech and language difficulties, there is specialist provision in two classes.

=== Greenwood Academy ===
Castle Vale Comprehensive School opened in newly constructed, purpose-built premises in 1967, although the buildings were completed and officially opened in 1969. At its peak in the early 1970s, it had 1,100 students, but this declined to 362 students by 1993 as truancy became widespread problem on the estate. Half of the building was empty and this space was occupied by the Castle Vale Housing Action Trust. As the HAT neared the end of its life, the school needed to reoccupy this space as demand started to increase again. The school's reputation was completely changed during the HAT's existence and the school now has waiting lists for prospective students.

The school now has approximately 870 students, aged 11–16, of which 25% live outside of the estate. It has specialist Performance Arts College status, which it obtained in 2002, and became an extended school in 2006. The school converted to academy status in January 2013 and was renamed Greenwood Academy.

=== C3 ===
C3 is an educational complex in the centre of estate that was constructed to a design by Associated Architects in 2006 and consists of Castle Vale Library and a community campus originally constructed for Josiah Mason College. When Josiah Mason College was merged into Sutton Coldfield College, it became a campus to Sutton Coldfield College. The college has merged with Matthew Boulton College and has become the property of Birmingham Metropolitan College. As of 2014, Jaguar Land Rover in partnership with ManPower has occupied part of the ground floor for educational and recruitment assessment purposes.

== Features of interest ==
=== Shopping ===
The retail facilities are concentrated in two areas on the estate: Castle Vale Retail Park and Reed Square. Castle Vale Retail Park is constructed on the site of Castle Vale Shopping Centre and features large units for major chains. In contrast to this, Reed Square, another modern shopping area, features small retail units fronting onto High Street.

Castle Vale Retail Park was built by Sainsbury's who occupy the largest retail unit in the complex. They also operate a petrol station near the retail park's entrance at the Chester Road. Other retailers include: B&M Home Bargains, Smyths Toy Store, TK Maxx, Argos and a furniture store. A separate unit was constructed to the east of the retail park at a later date and is now occupied by a Burger & Sauce restaurant. Smaller retail units are provided in a building next to the Sainsbury's supermarket, with the Post Office as one of the tenants. There is a public square to the rear of the Burger & Sauce unit with a sculpture in its centre called New Birth.

Reed Square is in the centre of the estate and was master-planned by Gillespies and Associated Architects who later produced more detailed designs for Castle Vale Library and Castle Vale Police Station within the master plan. The site covers 3.4 hectares (0 km^{2}) and is generally surrounded by housing with some office and educational premises to the southwest. The site previously accommodated shopping facilities which were underused and so the HAT decided to construct a High Street through the centre of the site to make it a community hub.

=== Parkland ===
The provision of green space for the community was a major priority for the HAT and the demolition of the Centre 8 tower blocks allowed for the creation of a new park. The result was Castle Vale Centre Park on Tangmere Drive. It is a 6 acres (0 km^{2}) landscaped area with a play area and formal bedding areas. It was completed in 2003 and became the first new public park in the city for a decade. It was designed by Fira and Birmingham City Council's Landscape Practice Group. A lighting scheme was devised by DW Windsor Lighting. In 2006, the park won the Civic Trust's Green Flag Award.

Project Wagtail was the brainchild of resident Jez Lilley who received a £15,000 grant from Birmingham City Council in 1988 to help transform an area of wasteland to the south of the estate into a nature reserve. He campaigned to schools and businesses and around 500 people helped plant trees and shrubs in the area. Lilley also established a gardening club and was given an office at The Fort Centre, on Farnborough Road. The office became a drop-in centre for unwanted pets and a bird of prey centre was set up, housing fourteen birds. Lilley also envisaged a footpath to encircle the estate and this idea was presented to Richard Temple Cox in 1994, who later offered Lilley a job as Community Development Officer with an environmental remit. Project Wagtail became his priority and it was funded over the next two years by the HAT, Groundwork Birmingham and Birmingham City Council. The result was a 15-kilometre (9 mi) network of footpaths around the perimeter of and bisecting the estate. This provided opportunities for the installation of public art and also provided pedestrian access to amenities. As part of the project, incidental open spaces were created, for example at Thomas Walk in the centre of the Watton Green area of the estate and Innsworth Green in Manby East and West. Innsworth Green is more landscaped than that at Thomas Walk.

=== Public art ===
As part of the area's regeneration, an arts initiative was established which has led to the installation of five pieces of public art within the area. The Community Arts Strategy was established in 1997 with Tim Tolkien appointed as Artist in Residence who commissioned five pieces of public art in the area by 1999. One of the most recognisable pieces to be created as a result of the initiative is the Sentinel sculpture by Tim Tolkien. It was erected on the A452 roundabout located between the estate and the Jaguar factory in 2000. The roundabout was subsequently renamed "Spitfire Island". It celebrates the area's connection with the Supermarine Spitfire fighter plane. Tolkien also worked with youth and community groups in Castle Vale to produce eleven "Dream Seats" which were artistically designed benches that were installed around the estate.

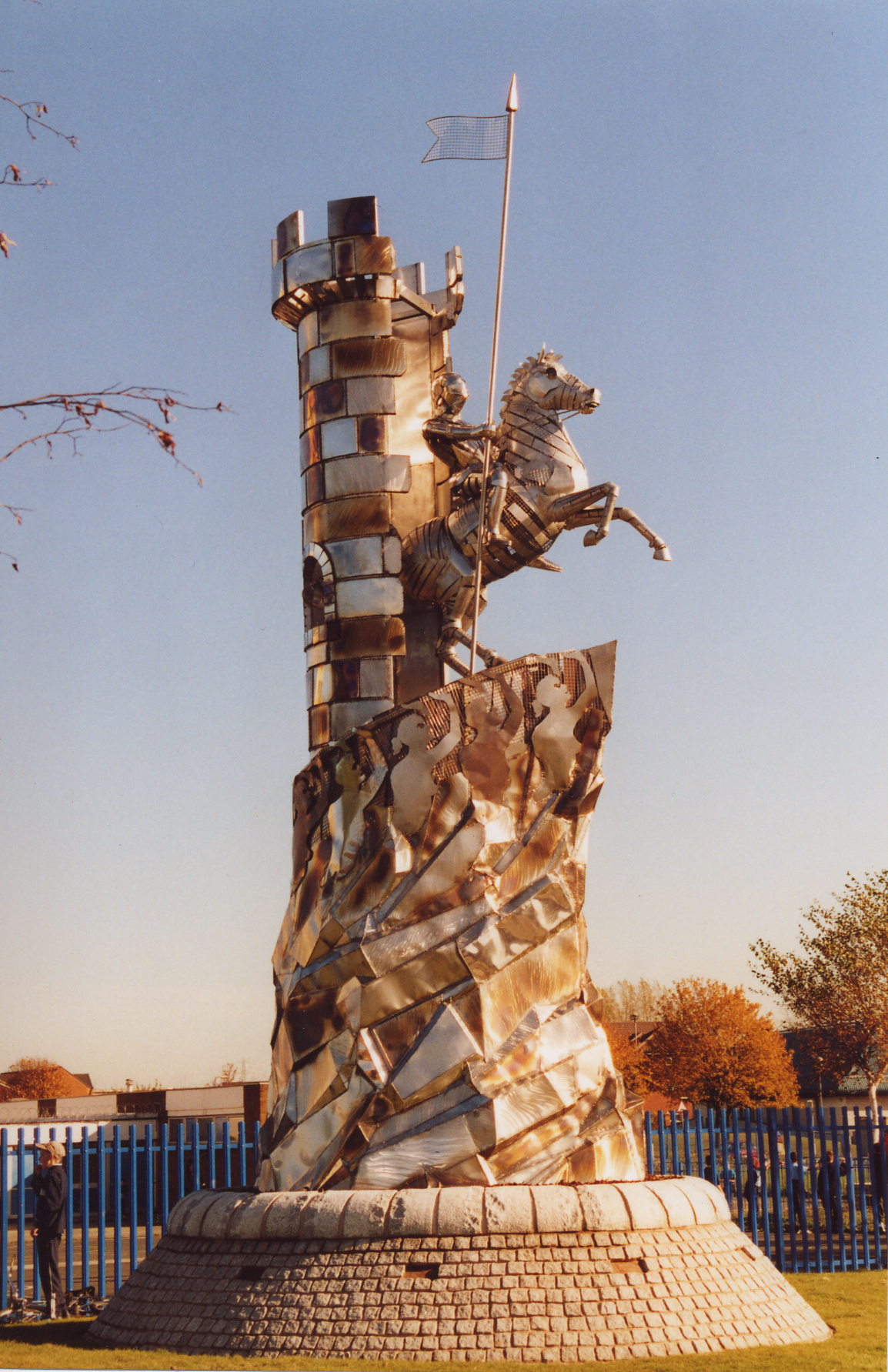
John McKenna's 'Knight of the Vale' steel sculpture

Another large metal sculpture that was designed for Castle Vale is the Knight of the Valesculpture, overlooking the roundabout at Farnborough Road and Tangmere Drive. The piece was the result of a Public Consultation competition held by Castle Vale Housing Action Trust in conjunction with Sainsbury's for a large scale art feature at the estate's entrance. John McKenna won the competition with 74% of the public's vote in favour of his proposal of a knight on horseback. The piece was fabricated totally in stainless steel and mirror polished for sculptural effect, it was entirely created at his studio in Worcestershire and was unveiled in October 2002. The sculpture is placed on a plinth and made out of 3 tons of stainless steel and measuring 8 m (26 ft) in height.

McKenna said of the sculpture concept "The idea of the Knight was as a protective inspirational character to the local residents, a fearless champion, leaping out of the old castle (vale) into a new unknown future, supported by the pillars of the people, who form the bedrock of the community, supporting the regeneration."

Project Wagtail led to the creation of a further three pieces of public art. A sculpture named Trees was erected by Jo Naden in 2002 following a study of plants with pupils at the local schools. At one of the highest points on Park Lane, Angelo Bordonari's Memories of Castle Vale stands in the form of three stones. It was created with the help of the older generations on the estate who gave their stories of their memories of the estate. Also on Park Lane is a floral mural by Paul Hill named Inset. Installed in 2002 with the help of St. Gerards Primary School pupils, it charts the history of the estate.

=== Public services ===
To sustain the needs of the community, there are various services available to them for recreational purposes. Some services were constructed along with the rest of the estate during the 1960s while others were added as part of the regeneration of the estate.

There is a neighbourhood office located on High Street which is operated by Birmingham City Council. It is open three days a week and provides advice and deals with enquiries from local residents. Other Birmingham City Council-operated facilities include Castle Vale Community Leisure Centre on Farnborough Road which hosts badminton courts, gymnasiums, a school hall with stage and grass pitches for football. Also included in the complex is the Castle Pool & Adventure Playland which features a 25 m (82 ft) swimming pool and a play area for children. One of the newest and most-recognisable facilities to be built in the area is Castle Vale Library, part of the C3 complex, located on High Street. Completed in December 2005 and opened on 6 March 2006, it was designed by Birmingham-based Associated Architects at a cost of £3.7 million with funding from the council, European Regional Development Fund and the Learning and Skills Council. There are 27 public computer terminals and an additional 60 study places in the 600 m^{2} (6,458 sq ft) building. The distinctive building features a curved double-height corner feature, topped by a sharp Tecu Bronze-clad apex.

The Sanctuary is a building on Tangmere Drive which serves as a venue for community events and a meeting point for many community organisations. Castle Vale Community Housing Association now maintains the building on behalf of the Castle Vale Community Care Partnership. Construction started in November 1998 and was completed in August 1999. It was officially opened by Sir Michael Lyons on 24 May 2000. It was funded by Castle Vale Community Housing Action Trust, Allied Dunbar and Birmingham Health Authority, who funded the building as part of the health village which has developed around Tangmere Drive. The building was designed by TSP Architects.

Also part of the medical village are Eden Court Medical Practice and Castle Vale Primary Care Centre. Castle Vale Primary Care Centre was officially opened on 21 February 2005 by then-Deputy Prime Minister John Prescott, although it had opened to patients on 13 December 2004 having been completed seven weeks ahead of schedule. Building work was undertaken by Costain Group and the building was designed by Gilling Dod. It is managed by Eastern Birmingham Primary Care Trust. It was constructed to replace a previous centre and is twice the size of its predecessor, allowing minor surgical operations to be performed at the centre. The building cost £4 million, £1 million of which was given by the Castle Vale Housing Action Trust with the rest funded by the NHS. Eden Court is further along Tangmere Drive and is a GP surgery operated by the NHS. The building was opened in 2001 and features a courtyard in the centre. As well as serving the needs of the local area, the building is also used by medical students.

== Transport ==
Castle Vale is bounded to the north and the west by the Kingsbury Road (A38) and the Chester Road (A452) respectively, and to the south and the east by the Birmingham and Derby Junction Railway and the Sutton Park Line, which join in the eastern part of the estate. Neither of the railway lines carry local passenger services which serve Castle Vale, although Castle Bromwich railway station did serve this location from 1842 until 1968, when the Castle Vale estate neared completion. There are now plans to reopen this station for passenger services.

However, at present, the public transport system serving Castle Vale remains a road-based service. Numerous bus routes operated by National Express West Midlands pass through or around the estate, travelling mainly along the three main roads. These access the estate from two locations: Tangmere Drive from Spitfire Island, and Park Lane from Water Orton Lane. The Manby Lane junction with Kingsbury Road (A38) to the north is another access point for motorists into the estate but is not used by buses. There is also another entrance at Castle Vale Retail Park, although this is used mainly by drivers wishing to access the car park or Sainsbury's petrol station. This was designed so that it would not be used as a thoroughfare into the estate. There is an extensive cycle-path network around the estate which follows the main roads and Project Wagtail.

In March 1995, the Castle Vale Hopper bus service was introduced as a pilot service for one year following a feasibility study by the CVHAT into internal transport links on the estate. This service was run by Serverse Travel for the first year, there was a Fare of 20 pence to use the service. On the day the route started it was declared open by the Actor Stephen Lewis, famous for his role as inspector Blake (Blakey) in the situation comedy On The Buses. The service was considered a success and was rolled out permanently with the service number 696. The bus service is the only route operated by Valley Travel, the transport arm of Merlin Venture, and follows a circular clockwise route around the estate.

Route number	Terminals	Bus operator	References
67	Birmingham – Castle Vale	National Express West Midlands	
71	Chelmsley Wood - Castle Vale – Minworth – Sutton Coldfield	National Express West Midlands	
71A	Solihull – Sutton Coldfield	National Express West Midlands	
638	Erdington – Castle Vale	National Express West Midlands	
696	Castle Vale local link	Valley Travel	

When Parliamentary Approval was granted for the construction of West Midlands Metro Line Two, approval was also granted to the construction of a spur to Castle Vale. The proposed route entered the estate from Chester Road onto Tangmere Drive and on to a terminus at Reed Square. Neither lines have started construction.

== Sport ==
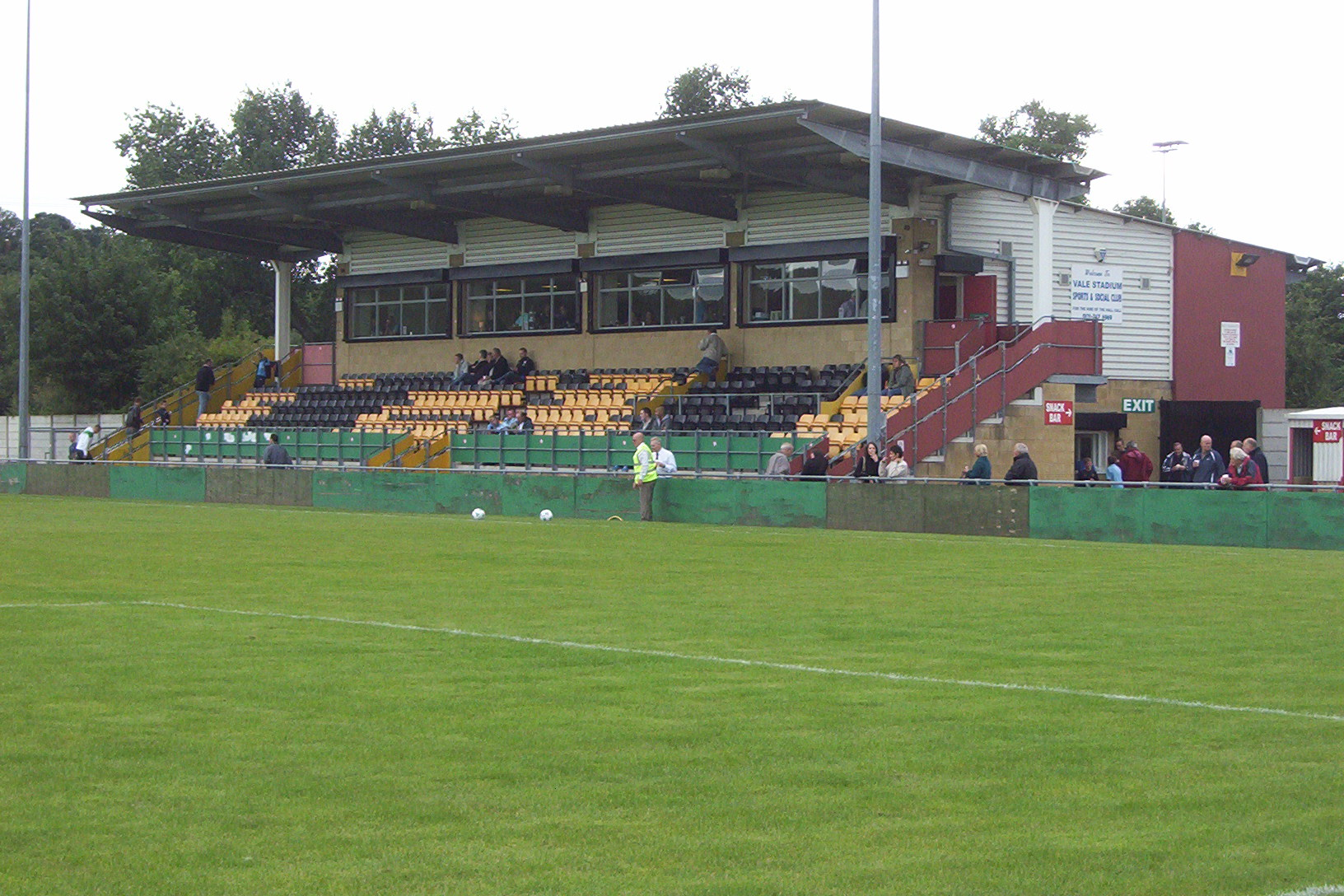
The grandstand at the Vale Stadium.

Castle Vale benefits from numerous sporting facilities which are open to all residents. A local charity Castle Pool Community Partnership now runs the Castle Pool after a Community Asset Transfer was completed in January 2015 and the swimming pool features a 25 m (82 ft) pool while the Castle Vale Community Leisure Centre has badminton courts, gymnasiums and grass pitches for football.

An additional facility is the Vale Stadium on Farnborough Road which hosts a grandstand, overlooking the main pitch which is then surrounded by several other grass pitches for football. The stadium is used by Romulus F.C., Castle Vale JKS F.C. and Castle Vale F.C., the latter two a result of an amalgamation of the now-defunct original Paget Rangers F.C., who played their last match at the stadium on 23 April 2002, and Pinnacle Sports F.C. Castle Vale F.C. is a more established football club than Castle Vale JKS F.C., although it has its roots in Kings Heath. They became Castle Vale F.C. following a series of name changes that reflected their change of ground. Castle Vale JKS F.C. was established in 1998 as a youth team on the estate and has now diversified into establishing an adult men's team and a girls team. In 2008, Sutton Coldfield United F.C.'s under-17 team merged with Castle Vale JKS F.C. and became known as Castle Vale JKS's under-18 team.

Planning permission was granted in March 2009 for the provision of new judo, dance and gym facilities at the stadium. The plans are estimated to cost £3 million.

== Media ==
Castle Vale is served by 107.5 Switch Radio, a community radio station and free bi-monthly newspaper Tyburn Mail, both of which were started by CVHAT and were operated by Headline Media Birmingham. As of April 2013, The station was granted a Community Broadcast Licence by OFCOM.

The community radio station originally started out in 1995 when young residents staged the first Vale FM temporary licence broadcast (RSL) from Topcliffe House with funding from the HAT. A further broadcast took place in 1996, firmly establishing local support for a community broadcasting service in Castle Vale. This led to the creation of Castle Vale Community Radio (CVCR), also known as Vale FM. In 1998, the organisation's premises within Topcliffe House were completely fitted out with new facilities which included two broadcast studios, a training room, digital recording facilities and office space. Since 1997, the organisation has run fifteen radio skills training programmes for approximately 230 unemployed participants in partnership with East Birmingham College, part of City College Birmingham. In addition, a total of seventeen restricted service licence (RSL) broadcasts have been staged, including five weekend broadcasts staged in partnership with other organisations. Further to this, a number of community – wide initiatives have been organised in conjunction with local organisations to facilitate the involvement of 350 young people in community radio activity. Vale FM underwent a rebranding in 2010 and is now known as 107.5 Switch Radio.

Vale Mail was first published in 2000 by CVHAT before being taken over by Headline Media Birmingham in 2004. The bi-monthly newspaper has 16 pages and is distributed to 8,800 residents in 4,100 households. In 2007, a survey conducted by Castle Vale Tenants and Residents Alliance showed that 84% of local residents relied on it as a source for local news.

== Community organisations ==
As Castle Vale Housing Action Trust was established to last a total of twelve years, the trust needed to find ways of maintaining their work after it was disestablished. A number of successor organisations were established throughout the HAT's life to deal with individual aspects that the HAT covered. The first of these was the Castle Vale Community Housing Association (CVCHA), established in 1997. The Housing Association manages the homes that were developed by the HAT's housing association partners. Now based at Reed Square, it manages around 2,500 homes and employs over 80 people, with a board of 14 members, the majority of which are Castle Vale residents. A landlord ballot in October 2003 found that 98% of residents wanted to be transferred to CVCHA following CVHAT's disestablishment, with the remaining 2% returning to Birmingham City Council's management.

Merlin Venture Ltd. was established in 1999 as a community development trust, focussing largely on employment and training. It is a not-for-profit company that owns numerous businesses that provides services for Castle Vale and beyond. It manages Tiggy Winkles Day Care Nursery, which was established in 1993 and is now based in two facilities on the estate. They also manage two transport businesses; Valley Travel and Buster Werkenbak. Valley Travel operates the 696 bus route, and Buster Werkenbak operates an on-demand transportation service for employees to travel to work in areas that are otherwise served with poor transportation services. Merlin Security originally operated CCTV cameras around the estate working with the Community Wardens employed by CVCHA to tackle problem areas this service was handed over the CVCHA to continue in 2011. Valescapes is a landscaping service for the estate that also offers employment opportunities for locals. To encourage job creation on the estate, Merlin Training provides training services in electrics, decorating and plumbing. Additionally, Merlin Recruitment offers residents services to assist them in getting jobs and liaising with businesses to publish vacancies. Merlin JETS is similar in that it offers advice to those looking for a new job. Merlin Venture is based at Venture House in Enterprise Park.

The Community Environmental Trust (CET) formally known as the Castle Vale Community Environmental Trust is an environmental organisation dedicated to protecting the environment, conserving urban green space, promoting sustainability and reducing CO_{2} emissions. The Trust was established in January 2000 and was originally designed as an umbrella organisation for several groups within Castle Vale. It was tasked with the common interest of the groups of protecting the urban green space and ensuring that the environment was not forgotten during the regeneration process. Today the Trust is a stand-alone environmental body that delivers many projects across the estate of Castle Vale and beyond. Including projects like The Castle Vale Forest Schools project, Confidence through Conservation, Cycle-Vans and the Community Garden.

To ensure that the key partners in the regeneration of the estate remain in contact, the Castle Vale Neighbourhood Partnership was established in 2002. The Neighbourhood Partnership holds community meetings with representatives from the community organisations and trusts to assist in any concerns residents may have.

== See also ==
- Castle Bromwich Aerodrome
- British Industries Fair
- Housing Action Trust
