= No. 577 Squadron RAF =

Former flying squadron of the Royal Air Force

- Active: 1 December 1943 – 15 June 1946
- Country: United Kingdom
- Branch: Royal Air Force
- Role: anti-aircraft co-operation unit

Insignia
- Squadron Codes: 3Y (Dec 1943 – Jun 1946)

No. 577 Squadron was an anti-aircraft co-operation unit of the Royal Air Force formed during World War II and active from December 1943 till June 1946 in the defence of the Midlands.

== History ==
577 squadron was formed on 1 December 1943 at RAF Castle Bromwich from elements of nos.6, 7 and 8 anti-aircraft cooperation units (AACU). It operated a varied lot of aircraft on airfields and bases all over the Midlands and Wales. On 15 June 1946 the squadron disbanded at Castle Bromwich.

== Aircraft operated ==
Aircraft operated by no. 577 Squadron RAF, data from
From	To	Aircraft	Version
December 1943	July 1945	Hawker Hurricane	Mk.IV
December 1943	June 1946	Airspeed Oxford	Mks.I, II
May 1944	July 1945	Hawker Hurricane	Mk.IIc
November 1944	July 1945	Bristol Beaufighter	Mk.I
April 1945	June 1946	Vultee Vengeance	Mk.IV
June 1945	August 1945	Supermarine Spitfire	Mk.Vb
June 1945	June 1946	Supermarine Spitfire	LF.16e
		Avro Anson	Mk.I

== Squadron bases ==
Bases and airfields used by no. 577 Squadron RAF, data from
From	To	Base	Remark
1 December 1943	15 June 1946	RAF Castle Bromwich, Warwickshire	Dets. at RAF Wrexham, Wrexham; RAF Sealand, Flintshire; RAF Montford Bridge, Shropshire; RAF Shobdon, Herefordshire; RAF Bodorgan, Anglesey; RAF Ipswich, Suffolk; RAF Mona, Anglesey; RAF Fairwood Common, Glamorgan; RAF Woodvale, Merseyside; RAF Atcham, Shropshire; RAF Barrow-in-Furness, Cumbria and RAF Hawarden, Cheshire
