= SS Ramsey Town =

Packet steamer in service from 1904 to 1937

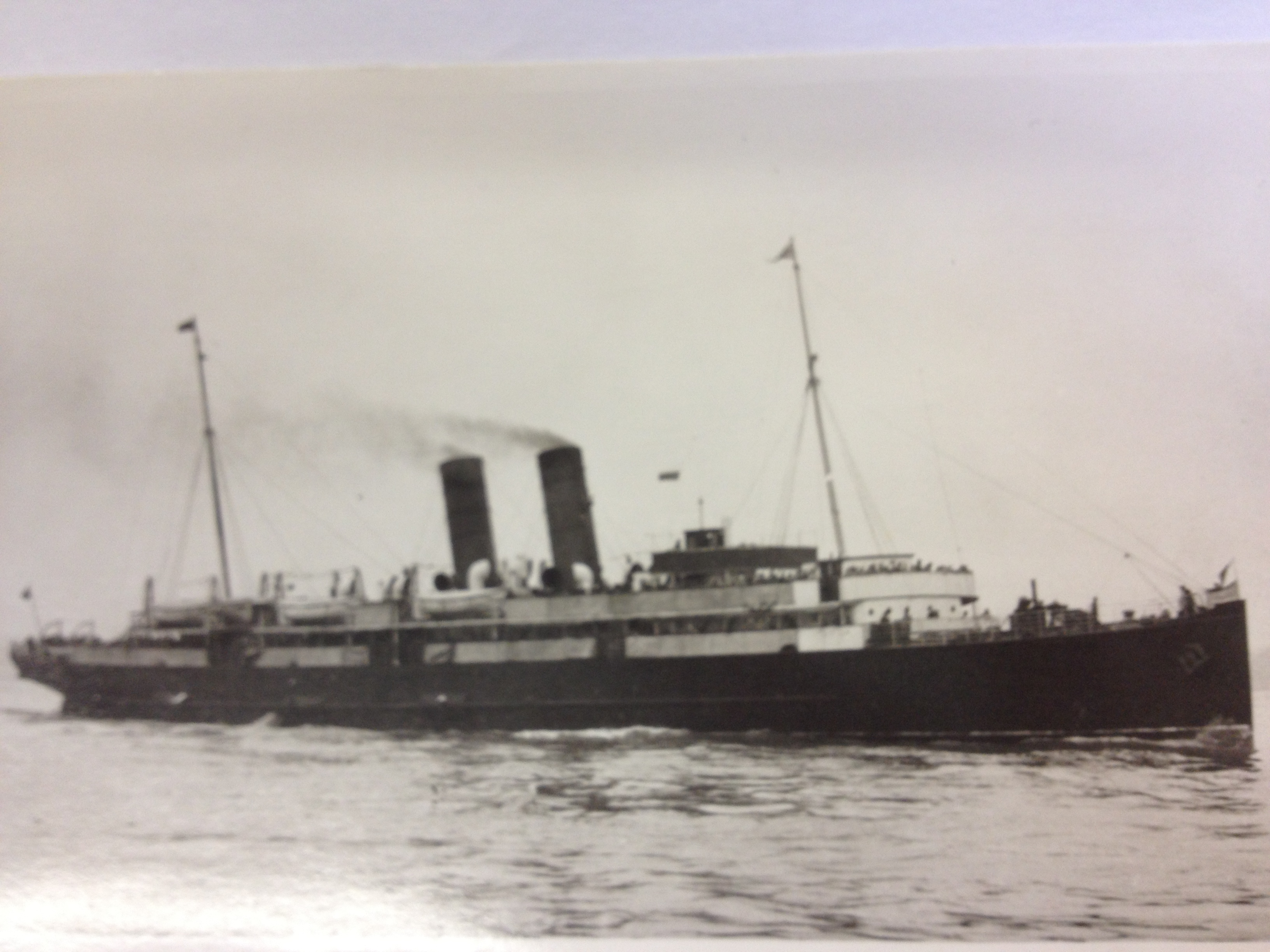
- Ramsey Town

History
- Name: Ramsey Town; TSS Antrim
- Owner: 1904–1928: Midland Railway Company; 1928–1936: Isle of Man Steam Packet Company
- Operator: 1904–1928: Midland Railway Company; 1928–1936: Isle of Man Steam Packet Company
- Port of registry: Douglas, Isle of Man
- Builder: John Brown & Co.
- Cost: Not recorded; purchased by the Isle of Man Steam Packet Company for an initial sum of £14,612 in 1928
- Yard number: 116015
- Launched: 22 March 1904
- In service: 1904
- Out of service: 1936
- Fate: Scrapped April 1937

General characteristics
- Type: Packet Steamer
- Tonnage: 1,954 gross register tons (GRT)
- Length: 330 ft 9 in (100.81 m)
- Beam: 42 ft 2 in (12.85 m)
- Depth: 17 ft 2 in (5.23 m)
- Installed power: 7,870 horsepower
- Speed: 21 knots (24 mph)

The SS Ramsey Town was a packet steamer which was initially ordered and operated by the Midland Railway Company under the name Antrim until it was acquired by the Isle of Man Steam Packet Company in 1928.

== Construction & dimensions ==
Ramsey Town was built at the Clydeside yards of John Brown & Co. in 1904, registered at Belfast and named Antrim. The vessel had a registered tonnage of 1,954 GRT; length 330'9"; beam 42'2"; depth 17'2". Ramsey Town had an operating speed of 21 knots.

The launch of the vessel on 22 March 1904 was a near disaster. On reaching the fairway, the steamer was swept aside by the combined force of wind and tide towards a Cunarder on the adjoining stocks. Several of the uprights at the stern of the Cunarder were knocked down by the Antrim, and disaster was narrowly averted by the assistance of the tugs in attendance. The Antrim sustained no damage beyond having her paint badly scratched

== Service life ==
On entering service with the Midland Railway Company she operated on the Belfast-Heysham service, and was purchased by the Steam Packet from the London Midland and Scottish Railway group of which the Midland Railway had become part, in 1928. The cost of the purchase, including alterations to the vessel, was £14,612 (equivalent to £1,112,040 in 2023).

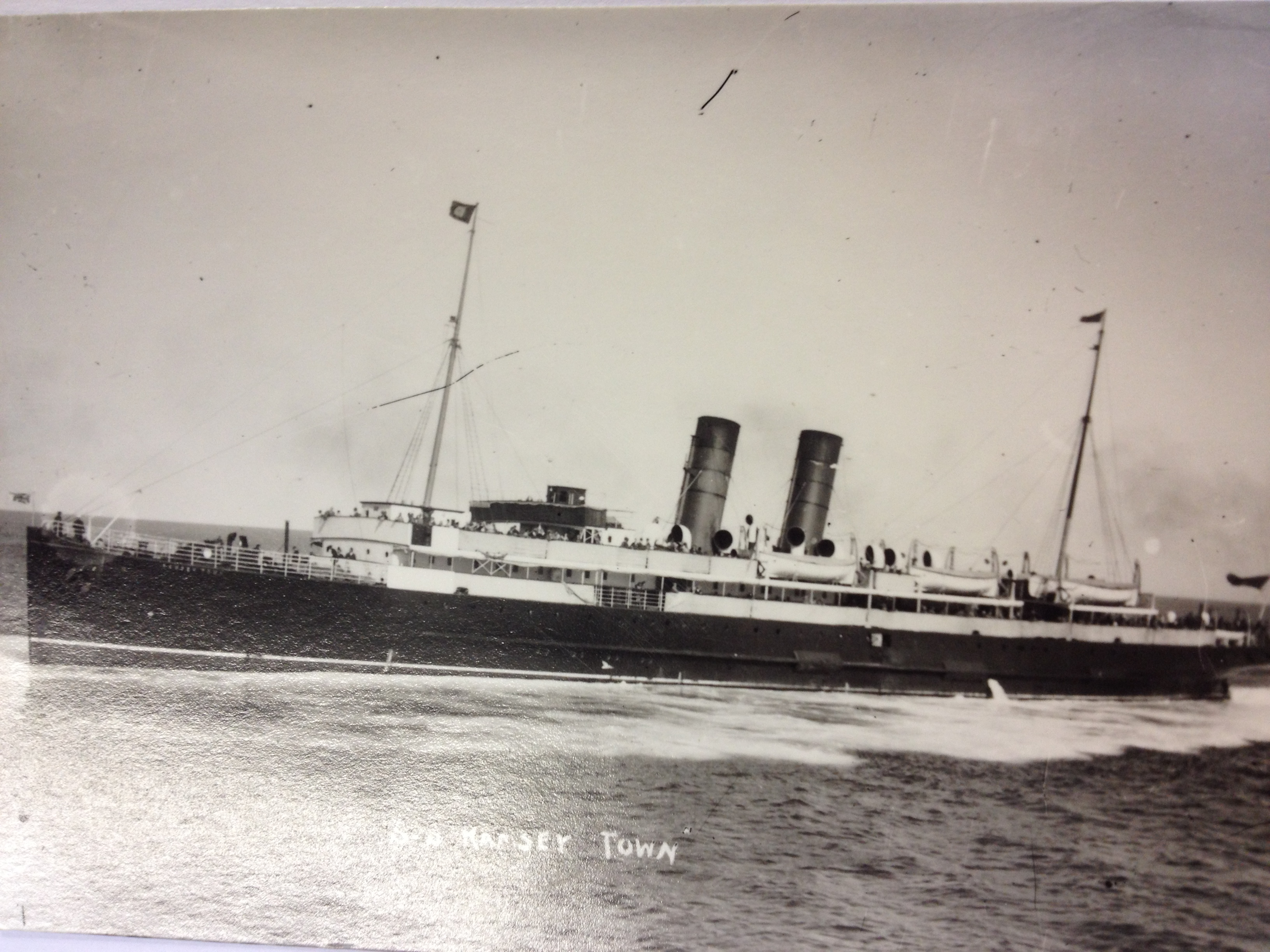
Ramsey Town on Steam Packet service.

On 6 September 1935 she rescued the flier Alex Henshaw when his aircraft came down in the Irish Sea while competing in the King's Cup air race. Henshaw presented her commanding officer, Captain Archibald Holkham, with a barometer bearing an inscription which acknowledged that his skill and seamanship had probably saved the airman's life.

== Disposal ==
Ramsey Town had one of the shortest records of service in the Steam Packet Fleet. She was withdrawn from service in 1936, and eventually scrapped at Preston in 1937.
