= Castle Vale Shopping Centre =

Retail park in Birmingham, England

Coordinates: 52.51700°N 1.79695°W

Castle Vale Shopping Centre (also known as Castle Vale Retail Park) is a retail park located on the Castle Vale estate in Birmingham, England. It is situated off the A452 Chester Road and was originally built in the 1970s. The retail park has a total floor area of 181,887 square feet (16,897 m²) and 659 car parking spaces.

The original centre was built in 1970 to serve the new housing estate that was being developed at this time. It was initially very popular thanks to its wide range of shops and modern, functional design. But it was one of the most hard-hit parts of the estate during the decline that began towards the end of the 1970s. By 1994, 30% of the units in the centre were vacant.

Castle Vale Shopping Centre was completely rebuilt as a modern retail park in 2000, at a cost of £35million. The new development was anchored by a Sainsbury's supermarket, which opened on 29 July 2000. The retail park is anchored by a Sainsbury's supermarket and includes Argos, B&M, Smyths Toys, TK Maxx, ScS and Lloyds Pharmacy.

In 2007 the retail park was sold by its owners British Land to PRUPIM for £90million. In 2021, Realty Income acquired the retail park from Ares Management for £63million.

In 2021, Realty Income acquired the retail park from Ares Management for £63million.[3]
