= Alex Henshaw =

British racing pilot, test pilot and author (1912–2007)

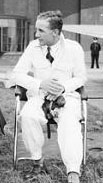
- Alex Henshaw, c. 1941.
- Born: 7 November 1912; Peterborough, Northamptonshire, England
- Died: 24 February 2007 (aged 94); Newmarket, Cambridgeshire, England
- Occupations: Aviator, author and businessman
- Spouse: Barbara (Dowager Countess of Châteaubrun)
- Children: Alexander Henshaw Jr.
- Awards: Member of the Order of the British Empire; Queen's Commendation for Brave Conduct

Alexander Adolphus Dumphries Henshaw, MBE (7 November 1912 – 24 February 2007) was a British air racer in the 1930s and a test pilot for Vickers-Armstrongs during the Second World War.

== Early life ==
Henshaw was born in Peterborough, the eldest son of a wealthy Lincolnshire family. He was educated at King Edward VI Grammar School, Stratford-on-Avon ("Shakespeare's School" where he sat at the Bard's desk), and Lincoln School (formerly Lincoln Grammar School). He was awarded the Royal Humane Society Medal for saving the life of a boy from the River Witham.

== Air racing ==
Henshaw's early ambition was to race motorcycles, and he harboured dreams of competing in the Isle of Man TT Races.

However after watching a biplane swooping low over the sea, he decided that he wished to learn to fly and undertook lessons at the Skegness and East Lincolnshire Aero Club in 1932, funded by his father, who bought him a de Havilland Gipsy Moth. Henshaw received his private pilot's licence (no. 4572) on 6 June 1932. He made a name for himself in the 1930s in air racing. Aged only 20, he competed in King's Cup Air Race in 1933 flying a Comper Swift, winning the Siddeley Trophy. He also flew a Leopard Moth and an Arrow Active which caught fire while he was performing aerobatics: Henshaw bailed out safely.

On 6 September 1935 Henshaw's aircraft came down in the Irish Sea while he was competing in the King's Cup; he was rescued by the Isle of Man Steam Packet Company steamer, Ramsey Town. Following the rescue Henshaw presented Ramsey Town's commanding officer, Captain Archibald Holkham, with a barometer bearing an inscription which acknowledged that his skill and seamanship had probably saved his life.

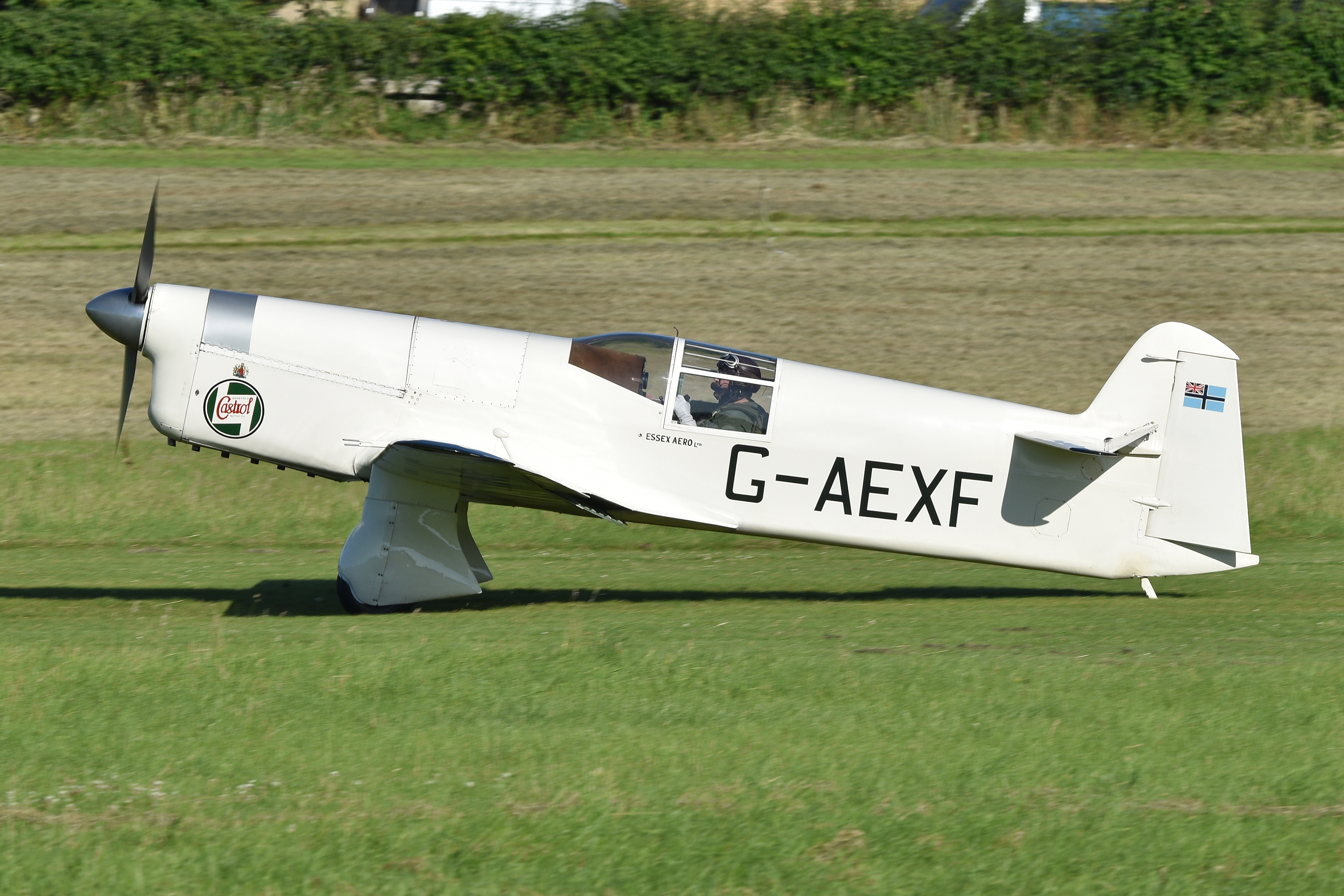
Henshaw's Mew Gull G-AEXF

He later acquired Percival Mew Gull G-AEXF, with which he won the inaugural London-to-Isle of Man air race in 1937. Following extensive modifications by Essex Aero, he flew it to victory in the 1938 King's Cup, flying at a record average speed of 236.25 mph.

Henshaw then turned his attention to long-distance flying. After reconnaissance of the eastern and western routes in 1938, he set off from Gravesend at 0335 GMT on Sunday 5 February 1939 to fly his Mew Gull to Cape Town and back. He refuelled on the way out in Oran in Algeria, crossed the Sahara to land in the Belgian Congo and then Angola, landing at Wingfield Aerodrome Cape Town after flying 6,377 miles in 40 hours. He spent 28 hours in Cape Town, and retraced his route back to the UK, landing on 9 February after a flight of 39 hours, 36 minutes. He experienced hazardous landings at remote bush airstrips, battling through a tropical storm, and overcoming extreme exhaustion on the return leg. He completed the whole 12,754-mile round trip in 4 days, 10 hours and 16 minutes, breaking the record for each leg and setting a solo record for the round trip. By the end, he was so tired that he had to be lifted out of the cockpit.

His account of his air racing career is given in his book Flight of the Mew Gull (1980)

The Cape record stood for more than 70 years. On 11 May 2009, Charles Stobart, flying a homebuilt Osprey GP-4, set a new record ratified by the FAI for the reverse route, Cape Town – London – Cape Town. Subsequently, on 3 September 2010, Steve Noujaim, flying a homebuilt Vans RV-7 supported by Prepare2go, landed at Southend Airport in the UK after completing a round-trip to Cape Town in 3 days, 11 hours and 16 minutes. The new record bettered Henshaw's time by just over four hours.

G-AEXF was restored to its Cape flight configuration in the 1980s. It remained in flying condition at Breighton in Yorkshire until Feb 2013 when it was purchased by The Shuttleworth Collection. The Royal Aero Club awarded Henshaw the Britannia Trophy for his record flight.

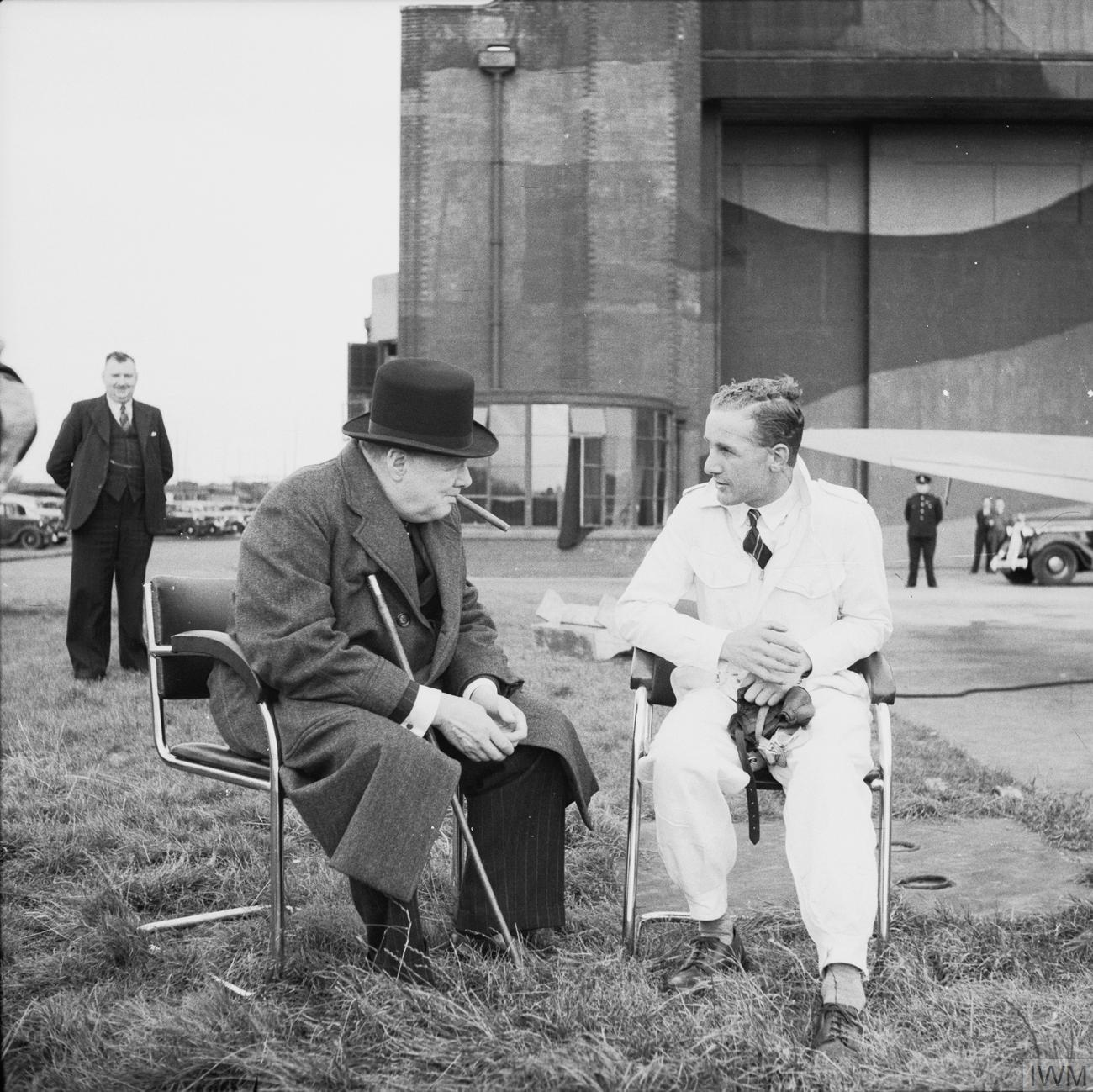
Prime Minister Winston Churchill talking to Alex Henshaw, after a 1941 demonstration flight on a Spitfire.

== Second World War ==
Henshaw considered enlisting in the Royal Air Force at the start of the Second World War, but he instead became a test pilot for Vickers-Armstrongs. He subsequently took the rank of sergeant pilot to fly a fully armed Spitfire to defend the factory, if needed, although he was never called upon to fly in combat. Henshaw started with Vickers Wellingtons at Weybridge. He did not enjoy the work, and was on the point of leaving when Jeffrey Quill invited him to test Spitfires in Southampton.

In June 1940 Henshaw moved to the Castle Bromwich factory in Birmingham, which had been taken over by Vickers after poor production results by the Nuffield group. He was soon appointed to the post of Chief Test Pilot, leading a team of 25 others. The factory built over half of the total output of Spitfires ever made, and 350 Lancaster heavy bombers; Henshaw tested both types of aircraft. Production/acceptance test flying was essential, ensuring that faults were detected before aircraft were delivered to the front line, but it was potentially dangerous: two of his team were killed testing new aircraft. Henshaw survived many forced landings and a catastrophic crash in Wednesfield near Wolverhampton on 18 July 1942 which destroyed his aircraft.

It is estimated that Henshaw flew 10% of all Spitfires and Seafires, testing up to 20 aircraft a day in often foggy conditions. He would also demonstrate the Spitfire to visiting dignitaries, such as Winston Churchill, and once flew the length of Broad Street in Birmingham at low level. He is the only pilot known to have performed a barrel roll in a Lancaster bomber, a feat that was considered by some to be reckless or impossible due to the aircraft's size and relatively modest performance. He flew this manoeuvre on several occasions with other members of his flight test team on board, including Peter Ayerst and Czech pilot Vaclav 'Venda' Jicha. (Venda was a pre-war aerobatic pilot, fighter ace, Battle of Britain pilot and previous member of No. 124 ("Baroda") Squadron RAF.)

Henshaw was appointed a Member of the Order of the British Empire in recognition of his wartime service.

== Postwar ==
After the war Henshaw became a director of Miles Aircraft in South Africa, a job which entailed visiting potential customers in the region and making demonstration flights. But the company folded and he returned to England in 1948. Although still only in his mid-30s, he never again flew as pilot in command of an aircraft. (Note: In March 2006, Henshaw, then aged 93, flew once again in a two-seat Spitfire T Mk IX at an RAF celebration at Duxford.) Instead he took charge of his family's farming and holiday business interests in Lincolnshire. He was awarded the Queen's Commendation for Brave Conduct for his rescue work in the 1953 floods.

Following his retirement, Henshaw wrote a book recounting his wartime experiences at the Castle Bromwich Aeroplane Factory (CBAF), Sigh for a Merlin (1979), the title referring to the Rolls-Royce Merlin engine which powered most Spitfires and Lancasters. This book was followed in 1980 by Flight of the Mew Gull, an account of the author's pre-war air racing and record-setting adventures.

The Air League awarded Henshaw the Jeffrey Quill Medal in 1997. In 2003, he became a Companion of the Air League in 2002 and was elected an Honorary Fellow of the Royal Aeronautical Society. In 2005, Henshaw donated his papers and mementoes to the RAF Museum, funding a curator to catalogue his collection. In his later years he was invited to make several flights in a two-seater Spitfire, occasionally handling the controls. The last of these came on 5 March 2006 when, at the age of 93, he took part in a flypast at Southampton Airport to mark the 70th anniversary of the first flight of the prototype.

Henshaw wrote a third book, Wings across the Great Divide which was published in 2004. This final part of his trilogy details his experiences flying in Africa in the immediate aftermath of the Second World War.

In 1940, Henshaw married Barbara, the widow of French race and test pilot Guy de Chateaubrun. Barbara Henshaw died in 1996. Alex Henshaw died at home in Newmarket on 24 February 2007. He was survived by their only child, Alexander Henshaw Jr.

An hour-long film biography of Henshaw entitled The Extraordinary Mr Spitfire was broadcast for the first time on The History Channel UK in September 2007.
