= British Industries Fair =

Trade show in Birmingham, England, 1915–1957

Coordinates: 52.513479°N 1.79354°W

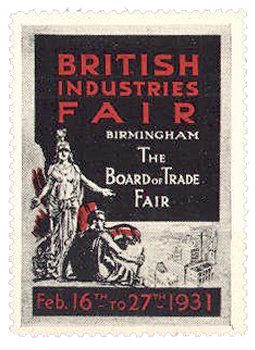
Cinderella stamp, UK, 1931.

The British Industries Fair (BIF) was an annual trade show held between 1915 and 1957, most often at twin venues, in London and Birmingham, England. The first show took place in 1915 during World War I at the Royal Agricultural Hall, London, to encourage the production of goods that would otherwise be imported from abroad, particularly from Germany.

== Birmingham / Castle Bromwich ==
At Birmingham, a large complex of buildings was built in 1920, situated between Castle Bromwich Aerodrome and the railway line. For two weeks every year it was the most visited attraction in the country. In 1933, the first diesel locomotive arrived for display at the BIF. The final B.I.F was on 6 to 17 May 1957. The associated aerodrome, which often showed air displays, closed with the final flight on 31 March 1958.

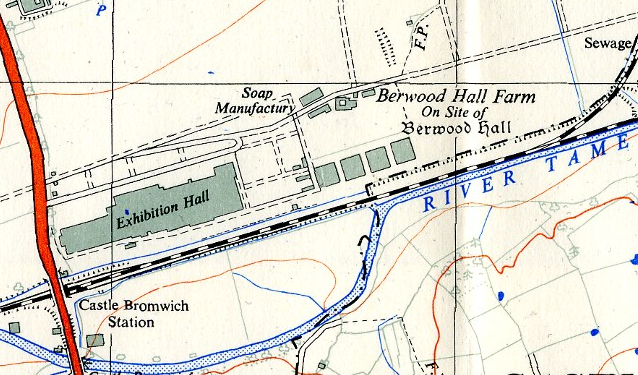
The Castle Bromwich exhibition hall and railway station, seen on a contemporary Ordnance Survey 1st edition 1:25 map

The nearby Castle Bromwich railway station received many important visitors for the BIF, including King George V and Queen Mary in 1928, the Duke of York, Princess Mary and Lord Harewood. They were often entertained afterwards by the Bradfords at Castle Bromwich Hall. In 1956, Queen Elizabeth II & Prince Philip visited the fair at Olympia, whilst Marshal Bulganin, Soviet Premier, and Mr. Khrushchev, Communist Party Leader, flew to Birmingham in order to visit the fair at Castle Bromwich.

The site was sold in 1960, along with that of the airfield. The buildings and the sites were cleared for the construction of the Castle Vale housing estate. The Exhibition Hall at Castle Bromwich was replaced by the National Exhibition Centre in 1976, 19 years after its demise.

== Venues ==
per Board of Trade; British Industries Fair: Minutes and Publications

- 1915; Royal Agricultural Hall
- 1916; Victoria & Albert Museum
- 1917; Victoria & Albert Museum; Imperial Institute; Glasgow
- 1918; London Docks; (Note: Pennington Street premises) Glasgow (Kelvin Hall)
- 1919; London Docks
- 1920; Crystal Palace; Birmingham; (Note: Programmes, brochures and advertising usually specified Birmingham as the second venue, especially for visitors from other countries, although the actual location is more specifically identified as Castle Bromwich) Glasgow
- 1921; White City; Castle Bromwich; Glasgow
- 1922; White City; Castle Bromwich
- 1923; White City; Castle Bromwich
- 1924; White City; Castle Bromwich
- 1925; (not held, due to the British Empire Exhibition at Wembley)
- 1926; White City; Castle Bromwich
- 1927; White City; Castle Bromwich
- 1928; White City; Castle Bromwich
- 1929; White City; Castle Bromwich
- 1930; Olympia, White City, Castle Bromwich
- 1931; Olympia, White City, Castle Bromwich
- 1932; Olympia, White City, Castle Bromwich
- 1933; Olympia, White City, Castle Bromwich
- 1934; Olympia, White City, Castle Bromwich
- 1935; Olympia, White City, Castle Bromwich
- 1936; Olympia, White City, Castle Bromwich
- 1937; Olympia, White City, Castle Bromwich
- 1938; Olympia; Earls Court; Castle Bromwich
- 1939; Olympia; Earls Court; Castle Bromwich
- 1940; Olympia; Earls Court; Castle Bromwich
- 1941 to 1946; (not held due to World War II)
- 1947; Olympia; Earls Court; Castle Bromwich
- 1948; Olympia; Earls Court; Castle Bromwich
- 1949; Olympia; Earls Court; Castle Bromwich
- 1950; Olympia; Earls Court; Castle Bromwich
- 1951; Olympia; Earls Court; Castle Bromwich
- 1952; Olympia; Earls Court; Castle Bromwich
- 1953; Olympia; Earls Court; Castle Bromwich
- 1954; Olympia; Earls Court; Castle Bromwich
- 1955; Olympia; Castle Bromwich
- 1956; Olympia; Castle Bromwich
- 1957; Castle Bromwich
