= North Warwickshire Borough Council elections =

Local government elections in Warwickshire, England

North Warwickshire Borough Council elections are held every four years. North Warwickshire Borough Council is the local authority for the non-metropolitan district of North Warwickshire in Warwickshire, England. Since the last boundary changes in 2003, 35 councillors have been elected from 17 wards.

== Summary results ==
Historically, local election results have fallen like this:

Election year	Conservative	Labour	Liberal Democrats	Ratepayers	Independent	Note
2023	17	15	0	0	3	
2019	21	14	0	0	0	
2015	22	13	0	0	0	
2011	17	18	0	0	0	
2007	21	14	0	0	0	
2003	15	16	4	0	0	Boundary Changes in effect
1999	9	22	2	0	1	
1995	4	29	0	0	1	
1973	8	19	0	2	4	

== Council elections ==
- 1973 North Warwickshire Borough Council election
- 1976 North Warwickshire Borough Council election
- 1979 North Warwickshire Borough Council election (New ward boundaries)
- 1983 North Warwickshire Borough Council election
- 1987 North Warwickshire Borough Council election
- 1991 North Warwickshire Borough Council election (Borough boundary changes took place but the number of seats remained the same)
- 1995 North Warwickshire Borough Council election (Borough boundary changes took place but the number of seats remained the same)
- 1999 North Warwickshire Borough Council election
- 2003 North Warwickshire Borough Council election (New ward boundaries)
- 2007 North Warwickshire Borough Council election
- 2011 North Warwickshire Borough Council election
- 2015 North Warwickshire Borough Council election
- 2019 North Warwickshire Borough Council election
- 2023 North Warwickshire Borough Council election

== Borough result maps ==
2003 results map

2007 results map

2011 results map

2015 results map

2019 results map

2023 results map

== By-elections ==
=== 2007-2011 ===
Atherstone Central By-Election 5 March 2009
Party	Candidate	Votes	%	±%
Labour		320	37.1	−4.8
Conservative		221	25.6	−17.9
BNP		186	21.6	+21.6
Independent		136	15.8	+15.8
Majority		99	11.5	
Turnout		863		
Labour gain from Conservative				

=== 2015-2019 ===
Arley and Whitacre By-Election 22 September 2016
Party	Candidate	Votes	%	±%
Labour	Jodie Gosling	577	59.7	+33.8
Conservative	Karen Barber	390	40.3	+1.7
Majority		187	19.3	
Turnout		967		
Labour gain from Conservative				

Coleshill South By-Election 13 July 2017
Party	Candidate	Votes	%	±%
Conservative	Caroline Symonds	571	60.1	+15.4
Labour	Claire Breeze	379	39.9	+3.2
Majority		192	20.2	
Turnout		950		
Conservative hold				

Newton Regis and Warton By-Election 23 August 2018
Party	Candidate	Votes	%	±%
Conservative	Marian Humphreys	451	52.2	−0.7
Labour	Andrew Downes	413	47.8	+21.5
Majority		38	4.4	
Turnout		864		
Conservative hold				

=== 2019-2023 ===
Atherstone Central By-Election 6 May 2021
Party	Candidate	Votes	%	±%
Conservative	Mark Jordan	367	54.8	+17.9
Labour	Sara Bishop	258	38.5	−7.0
Green	Joshua Smith	45	6.7	−10.9
Majority		109	16.3	
Turnout		670		
Conservative gain from Labour				

Curdworth By-Election 6 May 2021
Party	Candidate	Votes	%	±%
Conservative	Sandra Smith	875	81.5	+1.6
Labour	Simon Greenaway	198	18.5	−1.6
Majority		677	63.0	
Turnout		1,073		
Conservative hold				

Polesworth East By-Election 6 May 2021
Party	Candidate	Votes	%	±%
Conservative	Dan Hancocks	477	54.6	+23.5
Labour	Emma Whapples	396	45.4	−23.5
Majority		81	9.2	
Turnout		873		
Conservative gain from Labour				

Hartshill By-Election 21 July 2022
Party	Candidate	Votes	%	±%
Conservative	Marli Parker	351	53.3	+4.6
Labour	Elinor Parsons	307	46.7	+11.9
Majority		44	6.6	
Turnout		658		
Conservative hold				

=== 2023-2027 ===
Arley and Whitacre By-Election 1 May 2025
Party	Candidate	Votes	%	±%
Reform	Susan Guilmant	703	45.2	
Labour	Elinor Parsons	292	18.8	
Conservative	Neal Pointon	280	18.0	
Independent	Carolyn McKay	236	15.2	
Heritage	Peter Downes	44	2.8	
Majority		411	26.4	
Turnout		1,555		
Reform gain from Labour				

Atherstone Central By-Election 1 May 2025
Party	Candidate	Votes	%	±%
Reform	Steven Watson	378	48.6	
Conservative	Tony Clews	186	23.9	
Labour	Dawn Wilkinson	157	20.2	
Green	Joshua Wickham-Young	56	7.2	
Majority		192	24.7	
Turnout		777		
Reform gain from Labour				
