= List of wards in North Warwickshire =

This is a guide to the size of the wards in North Warwickshire based on the data from the 2001 UK Census. The entire population of the borough was 61,860.

Rank	Ward	Population	Councillors
1	Arley and Whitacre	5,444	Colin Hayfield
1	Arley and Whitacre	5,444	Mark Simpson
1	Arley and Whitacre	5,444	Andrew Watkins
2	Baddesley and Grendon	3,951	Andy Wright
2	Baddesley and Grendon	3,951	Ray Sweet
3	Kingsbury	3,779	Andy Jenns
3	Kingsbury	3,779	Brian Moss
4	Atherstone South and Mancetter	3,754	Martin Davis
4	Atherstone South and Mancetter	3,754	Denise Clews
5	Hartshill	3,746	Margaret
5	Hartshill	3,746	Brian Henney
6	Hurley and Wood End	3,642	Ann Lewis
6	Hurley and Wood End	3,642	Hayden Phillips
7	Newton Regis and Warton	3,625	David John Humphreys
7	Newton Regis and Warton	3,625	Patrick Davey
8	Atherstone North	3,585	Ray Jarvis
8	Atherstone North	3,585	Mejar Singh
9	Water Orton	3,573	Steve Stuart
9	Water Orton	3,573	Dave Reilly
10	Polesworth West	3,551	Sue Hanratty
10	Polesworth West	3,551	John Smitten
11	Atherstone Central	3,448	Neil Dirveiks
11	Atherstone Central	3,448	Lorna Dirveiks
12	Polesworth East	3,441	Emma Stanley
12	Polesworth East	3,441	Michael Stanley
13	Fillongley	3,393	David Wright
13	Fillongley	3,393	Leslie Smith
14	Curdworth	3,360	Joan Lea
14	Curdworth	3,360	Terry Waters
15	Dordon	3,225	Peter Frank Morson
15	Dordon	3,225	Jacky Chambers
16	Coleshill South	3,190	Mark Jones
16	Coleshill South	3,190	Stacey Ingram
17	Coleshill North	3,153	Dominic Ferro
17	Coleshill North	3,153	Adam Farrell

N.B. Ward populations will differ from the village population which they are named after and which they are linked to as ward boundaries very rarely match village boundaries exactly.
