= Austrey, Warwickshire =

Village in Warwickshire, England

Coordinates: 52.655751°N 1.565414°W

Austrey
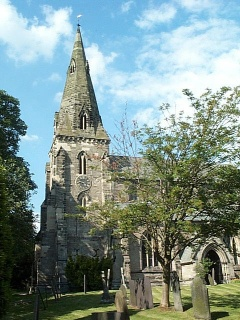
- Saint Nicholas parish church, Austrey

- Location within Warwickshire
- Population: 1,142 (2021 census)
- OS grid reference: SK294065
  - London: 104 miles
- Civil parish: Austrey
- District: North Warwickshire
- Shire county: Warwickshire
- Region: West Midlands
- Country: England
- Sovereign state: United Kingdom
- Post town: Atherstone
- Postcode district: CV9
- Dialling code: 01827
- Police: Warwickshire
- Fire: Warwickshire
- Ambulance: West Midlands
- UK Parliament: North Warwickshire
- Website: Welcome to Austrey

Austrey is a village and civil parish in the North Warwickshire District of Warwickshire, England. In the 2021 census, the parish had a population of 1,142.

== Location ==
With a population of over 1,000 inhabitants, Austrey lies in a central location at the far northeastern extremity of North Warwickshire and is also uniquely close to three County Boundaries of Leicestershire (less than a mile to the East), Staffordshire (less than two miles to the North) and Derbyshire (less than four miles to the North East). North Warwickshire Villages of Newton Regis (1 mile), Polesworth (3 miles), Dordon (4 miles), Warton (1.5 miles), No Man's Heath (1.5 miles) and Leicestershire villages of Appleby Parva (1.5 miles), Appleby Magna (2 miles), Twycross (2.5 miles), Norton-juxta-Twycross (1.5 miles), Orton on the Hill (1.5 miles) are the local neighbouring villages. Austrey is two miles by road from Junction 11 of the M42 motorway/A42 and this Motorway corridor provides access to many transport links.

== Amenities and facilities ==
Austrey has a village shop, post office, primary school, pre-school and a playgroup. The village has two churches, St Nicholas Church of England that dates back to the 13th century and an early-19th-century Baptist Church. The Bird in Hand is a 15th Century thatched pub and village hall (former Parochial School, which was erected in 1850) are both well frequented. The area in and around Austrey has many equestrian livery yards and stables.

There are a number of village clubs and societies including:- allotment society, archery group, art group, Austrey Rangers Football Club, bridge club, cricket club, gardening society, golf society, Neighbourhood Watch, scout group, tennis club, the WI and a walking group. There are a number of mobile businesses that regularly visit the village and these include a butcher, fruit and vegetable van, Dairy Crest Milk, mobile library and fish and chip van. Most of the village properties have the benefit of all public utilities including gas, water, sewerage, telephone and electricity.

== Origins of the parish ==
The village was sometimes spelt 'Alestry'. In the Saxon era Austrey formed part of a great block of seventy or eighty Midlands vills belonging to Wulfric Spot, the Mercian nobleman who founded Burton Abbey. In Wulfric Spot's will of 1004 Wulfric left Austrey "as it now stands with meat and with men", to one of his thegns who later transferred this part of the vill to the abbey. After the Norman Conquest the abbot was forced to share suzerainty with Nigel d'Aubigny, one of the Conqueror's trusted retinue, who was given lands in the parish as part of the spoils of the English defeat. Although he retained two and a half hides in Austrey, the abbot was no longer the principal landowner in the parish. The Domesday Book of 1086 records 42 inhabitants in the town.

The monks of Burton-upon-Trent took advantage of rising wool prices in the medieval period to sublet their estates for sheep walks. Aubigny lands reverted to Burton Abbey. In 1538 during the Dissolution of the Monasteries the Abbey surrendered its lands to the Crown. In 1541 the abbey was refounded as a collegiate church and Austrey manor was restored to it. However, in 1545 the collegiate church was dissolved and in 1546 the Crown granted Austrey manor to Sir William Paget. His son Henry Paget inherited Austrey manor in 1563 and still owned it in 1587. Thereafter the manor was divided into freehold farms that were sold to the wealthier tenants. One of the Austrey manors came into the possession of the Kendalls of Smithsby through marriage with one of Henry Alstre's co-heiresses in 1433.

The Kendalls were well-established in Austrey by 1550 and they continued to consolidate their position after this date. The other Austrey manor held by Sir Walter Aston was broken up and divided among his tenants in the early 17th century. By the Tudor period the village was divided into two separate parts: the original settlement cluster around the church and market cross at Over End and a later extension at Nether End. The Kendalls, hereditary lords of the manor, declared support for Parliament at the outbreak of the English Civil War and became involved with conventicles and dissent in the latter half of the 17th century. Henry Kendall was governor of the parliamentary garrison at Maxstoke from March 1644 to October 1645. The parish provided free quartering for a considerable force of parliamentarians commanded by Colonel Drummond and Sir Thomas Fairfax in 1646. It is the namesake of Austrey School, Karachi, Pakistan.

== Parish church ==
Austrey had a parish church by 1155. The oldest part of the present Church of England parish church of Saint Nicholas is the Early English Gothic tower, which was built in the middle of the 13th century. The remainder of the church was rebuilt early in the 14th century in the Decorated Gothic style. The nave has a clerestory and is flanked by north and south aisles, each of four bays. The Gothic Revival architect Ewan Christian restored the chancel with new windows in 1844–45. The original church had a leaded roof with a castellated wall; drawings of the church in the pre-Victorian format are held by Birmingham Central Library. In the Victorian era the current pitched roof replaced the original and the porch was added.

The tower has a ring of five bells. Three including the tenor were cast by Hugh Watts II of Leicester in 1632. Another was cast by Thomas Rudhall of Gloucester in 1770. The treble was recast by James Barwell of Birmingham in 1911 from another 1632 bell by Hugh Watts.

St. Nicholas' parish is now part of the Parish of All Souls, North Warwickshire along with the villages of Newton Regis, Seckington, Shuttington and Warton.

== Settlement ==
The line of earthworks below the church in the area known as the Bishop's Field are part of a complex of water management ducts and ponds with this area used as water meadows. A quote from George Barwell of Shuttington in 1790 :- "in the parish of Austrey where he was born it has been the custom ever since he can remember (sixty years) to throw the rich waters which are collected in rainy seasons on the common fields lying on the side of the hill above the village, over the meadows which are below it, by means of floodgates and floating trenches." Also in the Bishops Field is a natural spring known as the holy well. The new settlement at the Nether End probably originated with Earl Leofric's original grant to Burton Abbey, which would account for the siting of the monks' farmstead at nearby Bishop's Farm. The medieval pattern of settlement was scythe-shaped with tenements lining the main street running roughly parallel to the ridgeway from Orton to No Man's Heath.

The earliest record of the customary tenants on Sir William Paget's demesne in Tudor times is a partial list of the Austrey copyholders with the number of virgates held by each from a surviving manor court roll. All but two of the twelve tenants listed on the demesne in 1546 held a single virgate; one (Richard Cryspe) had a quarter and the other (Elizabeth Clerke) two virgates. Most of these family names are listed in the 17th century attached to Austrey farmers or craftsmen paying for a single hearth in the hearth tax returns. The two ends of the village had separate water treatment reed beds on the streams just outside the village – the area behind the current sewage pumping system at the South West corner of the village is still owned by Severn Trent Water. The parish has a Church of England primary school and a bus link to the local secondary school in Polesworth.

== Sources ==
- Bridgeman, C.G.O. (1916). The Burton Abbey Twelfth Century Surveys. Staffordshire Historical Commission. pp. 244–247.
- Calendar of Patent Rolls (Philip and Mary). Vol. II. p. 135.
- Jeayes, Isaac Herbert (1937). Burton Abbey Charters. Staffordshire Historical Commission. p. 187.
- Pevsner, Nikolaus; Wedgwood, Alexandra (1966). The Buildings of England: Warwickshire. Harmondsworth: Penguin Books. pp. 79–80. ISBN 0-14-0710-31-0.
- Salzman, L.F., ed. (1947). Victoria County History: A History of the County of Warwick, Volume 4. pp. 9–13.
- Warwick County Records: Hearth Tax Returns. Vol. II. pp. 2–10.
- Roberts, A. The Farming Inhabitants of Appleby and Austrey, Adelaide University PhD thesis, 1984
