= Warton, Warwickshire =

Village in Warwickshire, England

Coordinates: 52.630°N 1.581°W

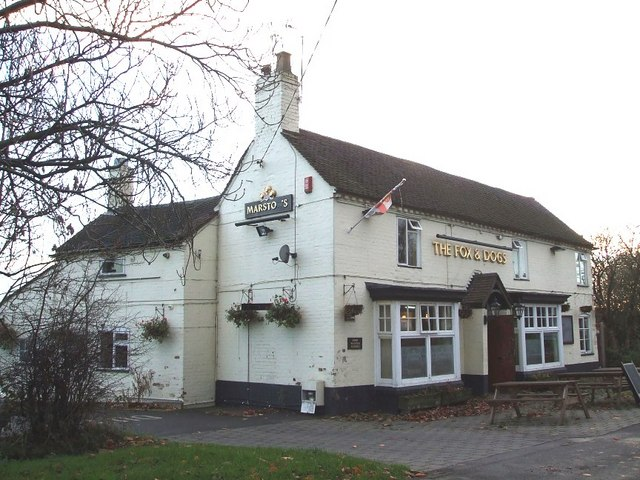
The Fox & Dogs pub

Warton is a village in the North Warwickshire district of Warwickshire, England. It is five miles east of Tamworth and four miles north-west of Atherstone, and is in the civil parish of Polesworth. Warton is a small village, which, being surrounded by rivers, may derive its name from Waverton (Water village). There is still a Waverton Avenue in the village, even though the street was actually constructed in the 1960s. The village has grown considerably since the 1960s, when its character was changed after an inflow of overspill families from Birmingham. Although small, the village has a pub (The Office - The old Fox and Dogs pub and adjoining land is being converted to houses), as well as a Working Men's Club. There is one shop – Maypole Stores (now called Top Shop), named after the Maypole that stood at the highest point of the village. In the 1980s, there were several shops, but all but one have now closed. Up until the late 1990s, there were two functional shops in the village, but the most northern one was converted into a residential property by its owner.

== Local government ==
Warton is in the district of North Warwickshire, and is part of the Newton Regis and Warton ward. The ward, which also contains Alvecote, Austrey, Newton Regis, No Man's Heath, Seckington and Shuttington, has a population of 3,625 and is represented by two councillors.

== Education ==
Warton's primary school is named Warton Nethersole's CE Primary School after the Nethersole family, who endowed a number of worthy educational ventures dating back to the 17th century.

== Sports ==
The village has a recreation ground and play area, which is home to Warton Working Mens Club FC.
