= Editha of Polesworth =

English Saint

Editha of Polesworth (Old English: Eadgyth) was an early medieval English saint whose cult was centred on Polesworth, Warwickshire.

== See also ==
- Polesworth Abbey
- Modwenna
- Mercia
