= Shuttington =

Village in Warwickshire, England

Coordinates: 52.644°N 1.622°W

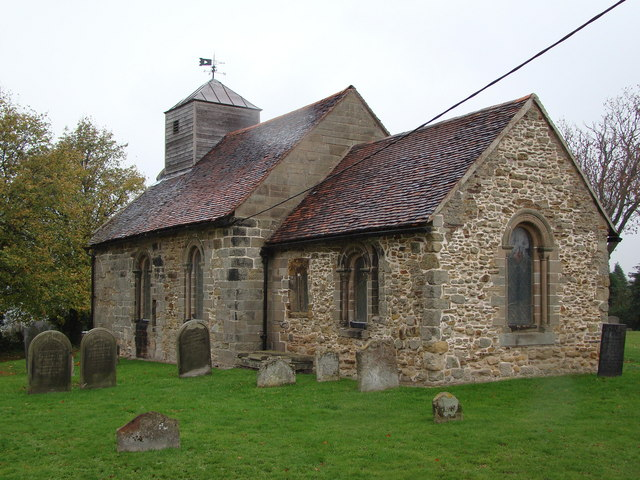
- Saint Matthew parish church

- Location within Warwickshire
- Population: 500 (2021)
- Civil parish: Shuttington
- District: North Warwickshire
- Shire county: Warwickshire
- Region: West Midlands
- Country: England
- Sovereign state: United Kingdom
- Post town: TAMWORTH
- Postcode district: B79
- Dialling code: 01827
- Police: Warwickshire
- Fire: Warwickshire
- Ambulance: West Midlands
- UK Parliament: North Warwickshire

Shuttington is a village and civil parish in North Warwickshire, England, situated north-east of Tamworth, Staffordshire. In the 2001 census, the parish, which also includes Alvecote, had a population of 563, decreasing to 536 at the 2011 census, decreasing again to 500 at the 2021 census. The River Anker flows through the parish, with Shuttington north-east of the river, and Alvecote south of it. The West Coast Main Line passes through Alvecote, with the Coventry Canal parallel to it and a marina south of the canal. Most of the parish is rural, including the village of Shuttington, although there was colliery alongside the railway at Alvecote.

A series of pools situated along the river, on the boundary with Tamworth, were created as a result of subsidence caused by coal mining in the area. The pools, which attract a wide variety of bird species, have been designated as a Site of Special Scientific Interest. The parish church of St. Matthew, situated on the edge of Shuttington village, is a small building, with a nave dating from the 12th century. The Wolferstan Arms pub is on Main Road in the village. There is also the Samuel Barlow pub, situated on the canal at Alvecote.

== Local government ==
Shuttington is in the district of North Warwickshire, and is part of the Newton Regis and Warton ward. The ward, which also contains Alvecote, Austrey, Newton Regis, No Man's Heath, Seckington and Warton, has a population of 3,625 and is represented by two councillors. Shuttington had formerly been in Tamworth Rural District, which was created in 1894, until the district was abolished in 1965. The parish was transferred to Atherstone Rural District, which became part of North Warwickshire in the 1974 reorganisation of local government.

== Notable people ==
- Charles George Bonner VC, DSC (1884 – 1951) recipient of the Victoria Cross was born in Shuttington.

== Gallery ==
Shuttington

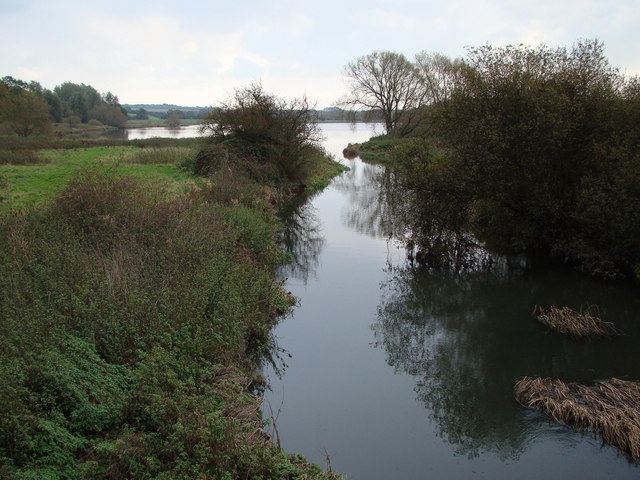
River Anker and Alvecote Pools, viewed from Shuttington Bridge

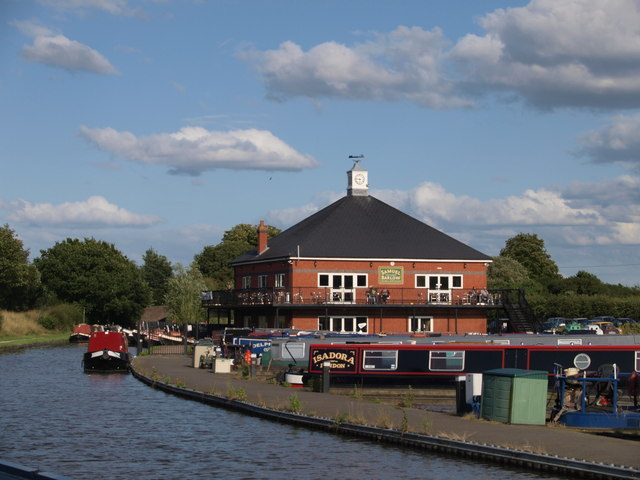
Alvecote Marina, Alvecote

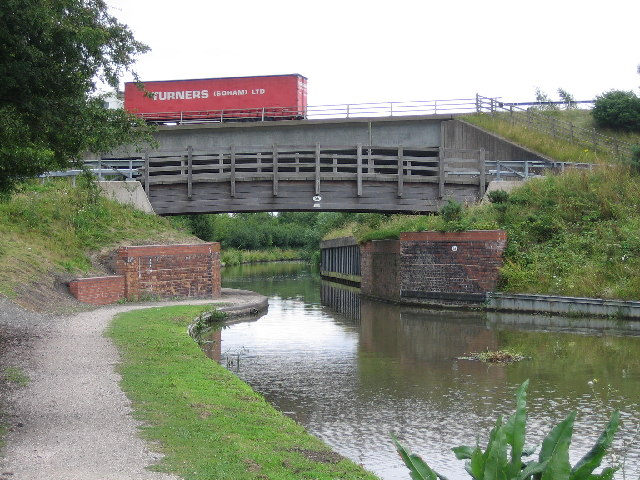
Coventry Canal
