= Alvecote =

Hamlet in Warwickshire, England

Coordinates: 52.638°N 1.633°W

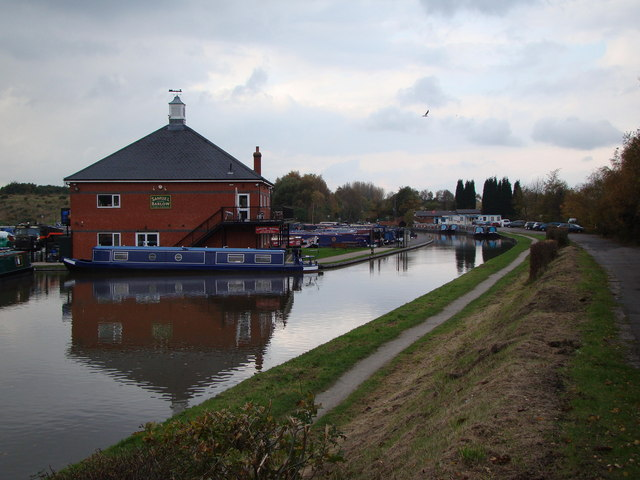
- Alvecote Marina

- Location within Warwickshire
- OS grid reference: SK2404
- District: North Warwickshire
- Shire county: Warwickshire
- Region: West Midlands
- Country: England
- Sovereign state: United Kingdom
- Post town: Tamworth
- Postcode district: B79
- Police: Warwickshire
- Fire: Warwickshire
- Ambulance: West Midlands

Alvecote is a hamlet in the North Warwickshire district of Warwickshire, England, located on the county border with Staffordshire. Nearby settlements include, Shuttington (where population details can be found), Polesworth and the Tamworth district of Amington. Central Tamworth is approximately 3 miles west-southwest of Alvecote.

Alvecote has a marina on the Coventry Canal that offers facilities including boat repair, pumpout and a licensed bar. The West Coast Main Line runs through the settlement. The nearest railway station is Polesworth, although now it only sees one westbound train (a parliamentary train) per day. Alvecote Priory is a ruined 12th-century Benedictine monastery. The nearest existing church is in Shuttington.
