= Orton Hall =

Orton Hall may refer to:

- the English seat of the Marquesses of Huntly at Orton Longueville; see Orton, Peterborough
- University, Hayes and Orton Halls, at The Ohio State University in the United States

== See also ==
- Orton on the Hill, in Leicestershire, England
