= 2007 North Warwickshire Borough Council election =

2007 UK local government election

- 3 May 2007

All 35 seats to North Warwickshire Borough Council 18 seats needed for a majority
- Turnout: 38.8% ▲6.5 pp

	First party	Second party	Third party
Party	Conservative	Labour	Liberal Democrats
Seats before	15	16	4
Seats after	21	14	0
Seat change	▲5	▼2	▼4
Popular vote	9,518	7,309	1,654
Percentage	49.5%	38.0%	8.6%
Swing	▲11.0%	▼1.2%	▼2.3%
- Results of the 2007 North Warwickshire Borough council election. Conservatives in blue and Labour in red.

- Composition of the council after the election.
Council control before election
No overall control
Council control after election
Conservative

On 3 May 2007, an election was held to elect councillors to the North Warwickshire Borough Council in the English Midlands. It took place on the same day as other local elections in the UK. It resulted in the Conservative Party gaining control of the council. The previous election resulted in no overall control with the Labour Party having the highest number of seats at 16.

All 35 seats from all wards were up for election, with 18 seats needed for an overall majority. The Conservatives won 21 seats, with Labour winning the remaining 14. The Liberal Democrats lost all four of their seats.
