= Birchmoor =

Village in Warwickshire, England

Coordinates: 52.611°N 1.629°W

Birchmoor is a former coal mining village in the North Warwickshire district of Warwickshire, England. It lies about one mile southwest of Polesworth (where the population details can be found), and 2 miles east of Tamworth, from which it is separated by the M42 motorway and the Staffordshire county boundary. It is generally considered as a district of Polesworth. Birchmoor Colliery (also known as Cockspur Colliery) was opened in 1860 and closed in 1927.
