= 2015 North Warwickshire Borough Council election =

2015 UK local government election

- 7 May 2015

All 35 seats to North Warwickshire Borough Council 18 seats needed for a majority

	First party	Second party
Party	Conservative	Labour
Seats before	17	18
Seats after	22	13
Seat change	▲5	▼5
Popular vote	14,025	11,373
Percentage	40.3%	32.7%
Swing	▼9.7%	▼15.0%
	Third party
Party	UKIP
Seats before	0
Seats after	0
Seat change	Steady
Popular vote	8,255
Percentage	23.7%
Swing	▲23.1%
- Results of the 2015 North Warwickshire Borough council election. Conservatives in blue and Labour in red.

- Composition of the council after the election.
Council control before election
Labour
Council control after election
Conservative

On 7 May 2015, an election was held to elect members of the North Warwickshire Borough Council in the English Midlands. It was held on the same day as other local elections. It saw the Conservative Party gaining control of the council.

The previous election saw Labour narrowly gaining control of the council. This election saw the Conservatives gaining 5 seats from Labour. UKIP had significant gains in the popular vote increasing their share by over 23%, although they did not win any seats.
