= Polesworth Vicarage =

Coordinates: 52.6187°N 1.6127°W

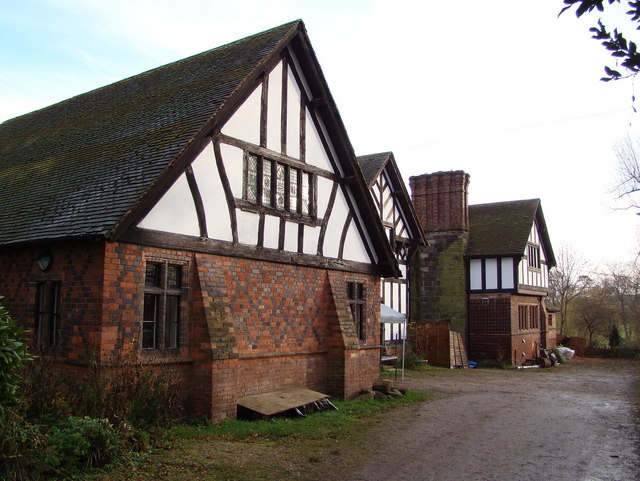
Polesworth Vicarage

Polesworth Vicarage stands adjacent to St Editha's Church in High Street, Polesworth, Warwickshire, England. It is recorded in the National Heritage List for England as a designated Grade II listed building.

The vicarage was rebuilt in about 1870, incorporating parts of an earlier building, the architect being John Douglas of Chester. It is built on the site of the former lodging of the abbess of Polesworth Abbey. The vicarage is constructed in brown brick with some timber framing and tiled roofs; it is in the form of an E-plan. Internally there is an Elizabethan fireplace and some 17th-century panelling.

== See also ==
- List of houses and associated buildings by John Douglas
