= Polesworth railway station =

Railway station in Warwickshire, England

Coordinates: 52.626°N 1.610°W

Polesworth
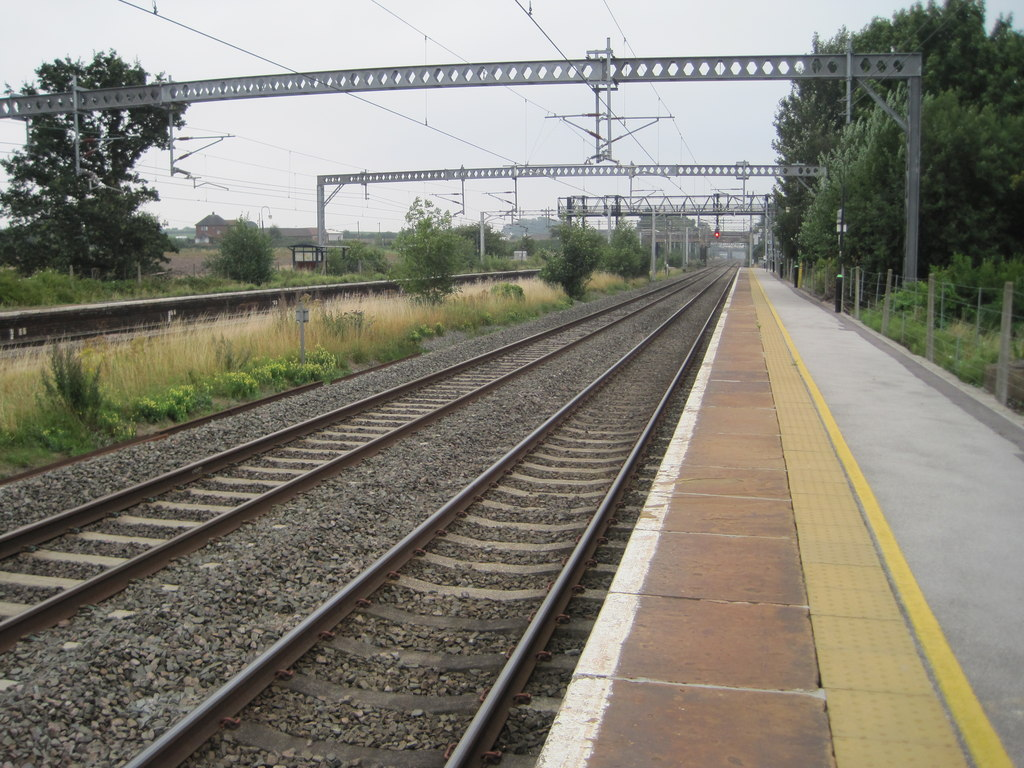

General information
- Location: Polesworth, North Warwickshire; England
- Grid reference: SK264032
- Manager: London Northwestern Railway
- Platforms: 2 (1 in use)
- Tracks: 4

Other information
- Station code: PSW
- Classification: DfT category F2

History
- Opened: 1847

Passengers
- 2021/22: ▲136
- 2022/23: ▲188
- 2023/24: ▼118
- 2024/25: ▲154
- 2025/26: ▲304
Location
Notes
- Passenger statistics from the Office of Rail and Road

Polesworth railway station serves the village of Polesworth, in Warwickshire, England. It is situated on the Trent Valley section of the West Coast Main Line. Since 2005, only the northbound platform has been accessible to passengers, due to the removal of the footbridge, and the station has been served only by a parliamentary train service of one northbound train a day. In 2023/24, it was the least used station in Warwickshire and in the West Midlands; it was the fourth least used station in Great Britain.

== History ==
Polesworth station was opened with the line on 15 September 1847 by the London and North Western Railway.

The line through the station was originally double tracked, but was widened to quadruple tracks between 1901 and 1903. A large gap exists between the tracks in the middle of the station because space was made for a planned island platform, which was never built; however, there was a signal box in the space until it was closed in 1990.

In the decades before 2004, the station was served only by an infrequent local stopping service which ran between Stafford and Rugby. When the Coventry to Nuneaton Line was reopened to passenger trains in 1987, the service was diverted to terminate at Coventry instead of Rugby. The May 1974 timetable shows six daily trains between Stafford and Rugby in each direction calling at Polesworth. The May 2000 timetable shows the service reduced to five daily trains between Stafford and Coventry.

Between May 2004 and December 2005, Polesworth station was closed due to the modernisation of the West Coast Main Line. During this period, the footbridge to platform 2 was removed by contractors and was not replaced. This left the southbound platform inaccessible. Thus, since the station reopened, it has received only a single daily parliamentary service by London Northwestern Railway, in the northbound direction only.

In 2005, the Strategic Rail Authority called for Polesworth station to be closed, in its "West Midlands Route Utilisation Strategy", noting that each train that called there received on average fewer than one passenger.

=== Accidents ===
On 21 July 1947, an express train from London Euston to Liverpool Lime Street derailed at speed on a curve around one mile south of the station. It resulted in five deaths and nineteen serious injuries, with another 45 sustaining minor injuries. The inquiry blamed the accident on the poor condition of the track, which was near the end of its life and in need of renewal; a major contributing factor was the backlog of track maintenance and renewals which had built up due to the Second World War.

Another derailment of a passenger train occurred at the station on 19 November 1951, which overturned the locomotive and caused minor injuries to two people. This was blamed on the driver missing a caution signal and then running over a crossover between the fast and slow lines at excessive speed.

== Service ==
The station is served by one train each day (a parliamentary train) on Mondays-Saturdays, operated by London Northwestern Railway; As of February 2026 a Northampton to Crewe train calls at 06:48.

Preceding station	National Rail	Following station
Tamworth towards Crewe	London Northwestern Railway London–Crewe Limited service	Atherstone towards London Euston

== Future proposals ==
In July 2019, Warwickshire County Council's Draft Rail Strategy for 2019–2034 proposed that a new station called Polesworth Parkway could be opened at a different location in proximity to the A5 and B5000 roads. If approved, building could go ahead between 2027 and 2033. No mention is made of what could happen to the existing station.
