= Polesworth Abbey =

- Abbey Church of St Editha, Polesworth
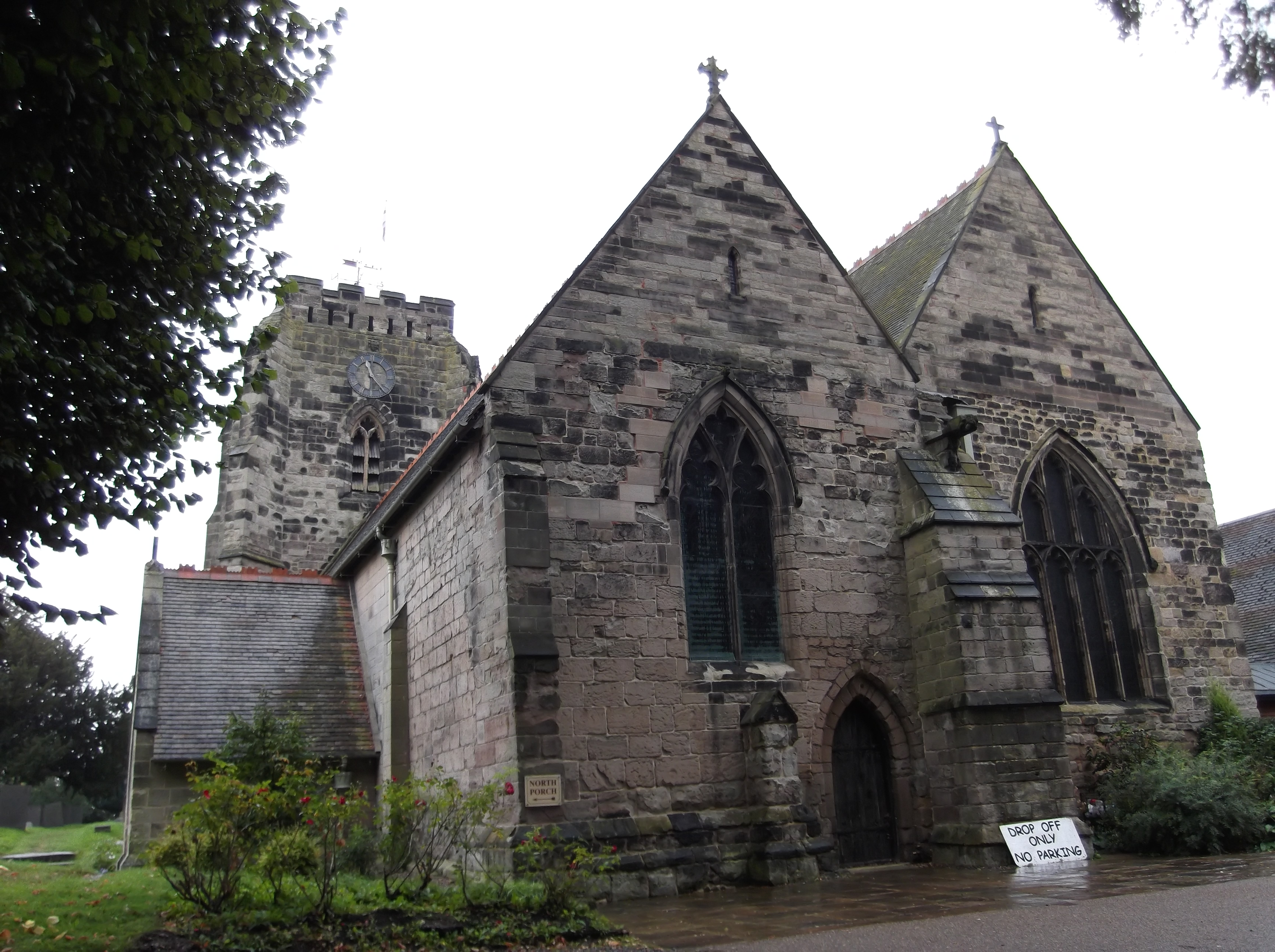
- Polesworth Abbey
- Polesworth Abbey
- 52°37′7.77″N 1°36′44.02″W
- OS grid reference: SK 26332 02433
- Location: Polesworth
- Country: England
- Denomination: Church of England
- Website: polesworthabbey.co.uk

History
- Dedication: St Editha

Administration
- Diocese: Anglican Diocese of Birmingham
- Archdeaconry: Aston
- Deanery: Polesworth
- Parish: Polesworth

Listed Building – Grade II*
- Official name: Church of St Editha
- Designated: 25 March 1968
- Reference no.: 1252564

Scheduled monument
- Official name: Remains of Polesworth Abbey
- Reference no.: 1005735

Polesworth Abbey was a Benedictine nunnery in Polesworth, North Warwickshire, England.

The early history of Polesworth and the identity of Saint Editha are uncertain. An early tradition concerning saints' resting places associates a saint named Eadgyth with a place called Polleswyrth, near the River Anker. The tradition has been translated as: “Then rests Saint Edith in the place which is called Polesworth, near the River Anker.”

Modern scholarship has associated Saint Editha of Polesworth with the early Christian history of Mercia, possibly as early as the seventh century. Nigel Tringham has suggested that she may have been a seventh-century Mercian princess, although the precise identity of the saint remains uncertain. John Blair included Editha in his survey of Anglo-Saxon saints and discussed the early evidence for her cult at Polesworth.

Medieval traditions associated with Polesworth describe a group of holy women, including Eadgyth and Osgyth, living religious lives in the area. These traditions were incorporated into the twelfth-century hagiographical Life and Miracles of Saint Modwenna, written by Geoffrey, Abbot of Burton. The work brings together traditions from different periods, and modern scholarship has suggested that some of its material may preserve older traditions associated with the cult of Eadgyth of Polesworth.

One of the stories concerns Osgyth, who is said to have been sent by Eadgyth with a book to another holy woman. Osgyth fell into the River Anker and was believed to have drowned, but was later restored to life through prayer. Andrew Sargent has argued that this miracle story may originally have belonged to the cult of Eadgyth of Polesworth before being incorporated into the developing traditions associated with Saint Modwenna.

The later identification of Saint Editha of Polesworth with a tenth-century royal woman associated with Sihtric is a disputed development in the tradition. The historical marriage between a sister of King Æthelstan and Sihtric, ruler of Northumbria, is recorded in the Anglo-Saxon Chronicle, but the identification of the woman involved with the Polesworth saint is a later development.

The site of the Abbey is a Scheduled Ancient Monument, although apart from the church and the gatehouse and the restored ruins of the cloister very little remains visible. The 12th-century Abbey church, now the parish church of St Editha, is a Grade II* listed building. The 14th-century gatehouse is both a Grade II* listed building and a Scheduled Ancient Monument. It has been restored and renovated to provide apartments available for rent.

== Parish church ==
Following the Dissolution of the Monasteries in 1536, the Abbey was granted by Henry VIII to Francis Goodere of St Albans, Hertfordshire in 1544; Goodere dismantled many of the Abbey buildings to provide stone for a new manor house (Polesworth Hall) which he built on the site. Later Sir Henry Goodere was a patron of the arts and leader of the Polesworth Group of poets, which included his protégé Michael Drayton.

Polesworth Hall was demolished before 1868 and the Vicarage was built on the site. The abbey now functions as the Church of England parish church of Polesworth.

== Organ ==
The church contains a three manual pipe organ by Taylor of Leicester. It was originally installed in 1912 in St Michael & All Angels' Church, Leicester. A specification of the organ can be found on the National Pipe Organ Register.

== See also ==
- List of English abbeys, priories and friaries serving as parish churches

== Other sources ==
- A History of the County of Warwickshire, Volume 4 (1947) from British History online
- Polesworth Abbey by Warwickshire Timetrail.
