= Alvecote Priory =

Ruined priory in Warwickshire, England

Coordinates: 52.63408°N 1.63056°W

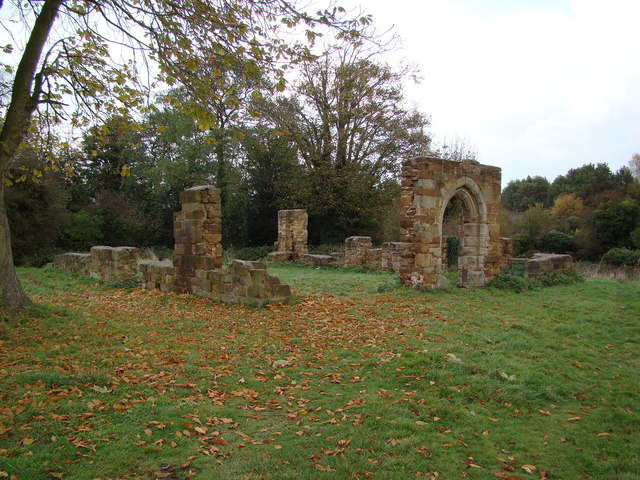
Remains of Alvecote Priory.

Alvecote Priory is a ruined Benedictine priory in Alvecote, Warwickshire, England. The site has been scheduled as an ancient monument. Now very little remains of the priory: most of the walls have been eroded, but a fairly high wall remains on one side. The main entrance arch is the most impressive feature, still standing at around 20 feet (6 m) high. The attached dovecote also survives; however both the ruined priory and the dovecote are on the Heritage at Risk Register due to vandalism and water damage.

== History ==
The priory was founded in 1159 by William Burdett as a dependency of Great Malvern Priory. After returning from a crusade, Burdett accused his wife of being unfaithful and stabbed her, and as penance founded the monastery. Little is known of the history of this small priory. We only know the names of five of its priors. The first prior of whom any record survives was William de Wikwane, who resigned in 1282. The last two priors of this small house were in office in rapid succession. William Sutton was recorded as prior in 1535, but by the following year he had been succeeded by William Umberleye. It was probably he who finally surrendered the house to the King's commissioners when the mother house of Great Malvern was finally dissolved in 1540.

Dugdale stated that the tomb of the founder was located in an arch of the wall on the north side of the church and was covered by “a plain free stone curiously embossed with the sculpture of a large cross”. The priory was not richly endowed, and the taxation of 1291 gave its property a value of £7 9s 2d. After two centuries the priory buildings were in poor repair, but the monks gained the favour of Edward III. Protection was granted to the monks and their attorneys to collect alms in churches for the restoration of the church and cloister. The priory was suppressed in 1543, and the priory and its lands were granted to Chancellor Audley. In June it was alienated to Joan Robynson, the widow of the mercer George Robynson of London. The priory remains are now included in Pooley Country Park.

The priory house (a ruin in 1965) was built from the stone of the old Benedictine Priory.

== Incomplete list of priors ==
- William de Wikwane: resigned 1282
- William de Beaulis: appointed 1315
- Richard de Malverne: occurs 1341
- William Sutton: occurs 1535
- William Umberleye: occurs 1536

== See also ==
- grid reference SK251041
