= Lichfield rail crash =

Railway crash in the United Kingdom

Details
- Date: 1 January 1946
- Location: Lichfield Trent Valley railway station
- Country: England
- Line: Trent Valley Line
- Operator: London Midland and Scottish Railway
- Cause: Points failure

Statistics
- Trains: 2
- Deaths: 20
- Injured: 21

The Lichfield rail crash was a rail crash which occurred on New Year's Day 1946 at Lichfield Trent Valley station in Staffordshire, England. 20 people were killed in the accident, caused when a points failure routed a goods train into the back of a stationary passenger train waiting at the station.

== The crash ==
At Lichfield Trent Valley station there were four tracks running through the station: two fast through lines in each direction with loops on each side for trains stopping at the station.

The crash occurred at 18:58, and involved the 14:50 fish train from Fleetwood to London Broad Street. This train consisted of seven four-wheel fish vans and a brake van hauled by a Stanier Class 5 4-6-0 No. 5495. It was travelling at around 35 mph (55 km/h) when it passed into the station, and was scheduled to run through on the fast up line. However at the north end of the station, the points had become stuck in the position used by the preceding train – a Stafford to Nuneaton local passenger train, which had left the main line for the platform loop in order to stop at the station and was still waiting there for the goods train to pass. The goods train was diverted onto the platform loop where it collided with the rear end of the local passenger train. The passenger train consisted of four old wooden-bodied coaches; the force of the impact demolished the rear three coaches, and hurled the engine (LNWR Prince of Wales Class 4-6-0 number 25802) forwards 100 yards (90 m).

=== Casualties ===
20 passengers on the passenger train lost their lives – 13 in the collision and the remainder either in hospital or on the way there. Another 21 were injured, some seriously, including a porter on the platform who was injured by flying debris. The crew of the passenger train were unhurt, however the crew of the goods train suffered bruises and minor injuries, and the driver had to be treated for severe shock.

== Cause ==
The points failure was caused by the extremely cold weather that day freezing the point mechanisms. When the signalman had accepted the fish train from the previous signalbox to the North, he needed to swing the facing points (that allowed entry into the Up Platform Loop from the Up line) from reverse to normal. Unbeknown to him, the points had frozen in reverse position. However, he was able to push the lever back into the frame and engage the point lock and thus clear the signal. He was able to do this because the point rods had become bent, allowing sufficient play for the lever to be pushed fully into the normal position, but actually leaving the points in reverse. This accident is one of the very rare occasions where mechanical interlocking has failed to work correctly.

== In popular culture ==
This event, alongside the Abbots Ripton rail accident, is the basis for the story The Flying Kipper in the Railway Series by Rev. W. Awdry.

== Sources ==
- Ministry of Transport official report
