= Jodie Gosling =

British politician

Jodie Gosling MP
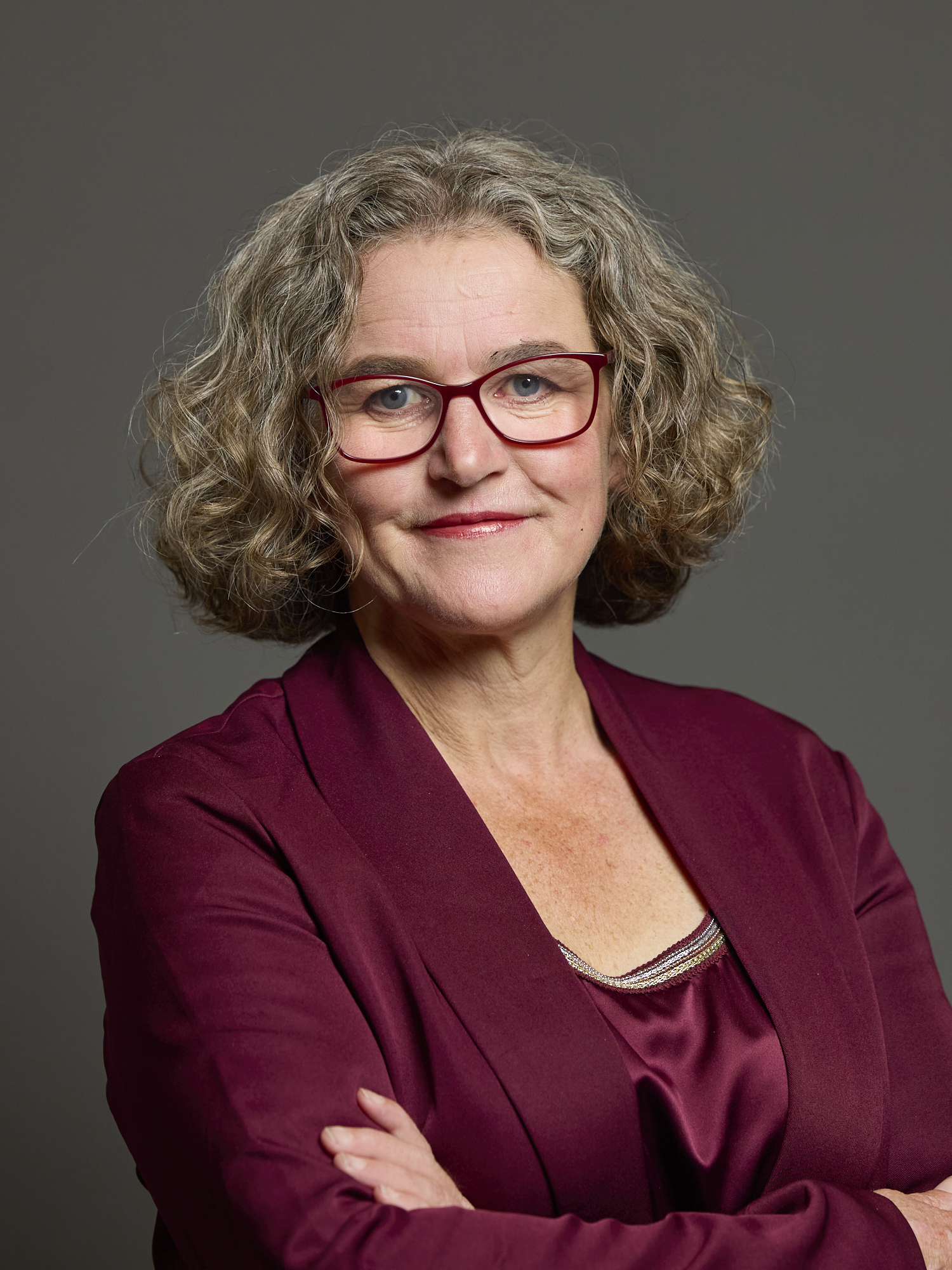
- Official portrait, 2024

Member of Parliament for Nuneaton
- Incumbent
- Assumed office 4 July 2024
- Preceded by: Marcus Jones
- Majority: 3,479 (8.4%)

Personal details
- Born: 4 July 1972 (age 54)
- Party: Labour
- Occupation: Politician

Jodie Claire Gosling (born 4 July 1972) is a British Labour Party politician who has been the Member of Parliament (MP) for Nuneaton since 2024. She gained the seat from Conservative Marcus Jones.

== Early career ==
Gosling is a nursery manager, teacher, and former civil servant.

== Local government ==
In the September 2016 North Warwickshire Borough Council by-election for the Arley and Whitacre ward, Gosling won the seat from the sitting Conservative Party. In the May 2019 North Warwickshire Borough Council election, she retained the seat with 613 votes. In May 2021, she unsuccessfully stood as a Labour candidate in the 2021 Warwickshire County Council election for the Coleshill South and Arley ward. In the May 2023 North Warwickshire Borough Council election, she retained her Arley and Whitacre seat with 767 votes.

== Parliamentary career ==
In March 2024, Gosling was announced as Nuneaton's Labour Party candidate during a vote, being picked ahead of Daniel Shearer and other party members. Gosling was elected to the House of Commons as Member of Parliament for Nuneaton in July 2024 during the 2024 general election, with a total of 15,216 votes, a majority of 3,479. Her victory saw her become the town's first female MP, and first new Labour MP in 32 years since Bill Olner in 1992.

Parliament of the United Kingdom
Preceded by Marcus Jones	Member of Parliament for Nuneaton; 2024–present	Incumbent
