= Morebarne Grange =

Country house and estate in Leicestershire

Coordinates: 52.621°N 1.550°W

Morebarne or Moore Barn is a grange originally belonging to the Abbey of Merevale, near Orton on the Hill in Sparkenhoe Hundred, Leicestershire, England. It is mentioned in possession of Robert Bradshaw in 1567, and as the 'capite' of Robert Bradshaw esq. the brother of John Bradshaw of Orton on the Hill in 1609. They were descendants of Hugh Bradshaw of Nantwich in Lancashire, who purchased the manor in 1546. It was later sold to the Steeles who bought the manor, the estate and the attached "mansion house", sometime after 1640.

John Nichols records the grange as a holding of 308 acres (1.25 km^{2}) enclosed in a ring fence (Vol. IV, p. 853)

During the English Civil War Mr Bradshaw was extremely hard hit by the loss of valuable horses taken by parliamentary troops from the local Warwickshire garrisons. A claim for losses submitted to the Warwickshire county committee from June, 1646 reveals that on one visit Captain Ottaway and Captain Flower from the Coventry garrison seized fifteen valuable horses worth an estimated total of £242.13.4. In June, 1643, Captain Castleton of the Tamworth Castle garrison took a stoned colt from Mr Bradshaw estimated to be worth £10 and on another occasion Captain Hunt of the Astley garrison took two mares and a stoned horse worth £36. (Exchequer accounts, SP28/161)
