= 1995 North Warwickshire Borough Council election =

1995 UK local government election

- 4 May 1995

All 34 seats to North Warwickshire Borough Council 18 seats needed for a majority
- Turnout: 40.5% ▼8.4 pp

	First party	Second party	Third party
Party	Labour	Conservative	Independent
Seats before	20	12	2
Seats after	29	4	1
Seat change	▲9	▼8	▼1
Popular vote	20,058	12,766	511
Percentage	63.9%	29.2%	3.1%
Swing	▲17.2%	▼11.4%	▼3.4%
	Fourth party
Party	Liberal Democrats
Seats before	0
Seats after	0
Seat change	0
Popular vote	1,240
Percentage	3.8%
Swing	▼2.4%
- Composition of the council after the election.
Council control before election
Labour
Council control after election
Labour

An election was held on 4 May 1995 to elect all 34 members of the North Warwickshire Borough Council in the English Midlands. It resulted in the Labour Party retaining control of the council.

This election saw Labour making significant gains, winning nine more seats than the last election from eight Conservative councillors and an independent. The Conservatives only retained four of the twelve seats they held. An independent also retained their seat.
