= 2003 North Warwickshire Borough Council election =

2003 UK local government election

- 1 May 2003

All 35 seats to North Warwickshire Borough Council 18 seats needed for a majority
- Turnout: 32.3% ▼2.0 pp

	First party	Second party	Third party
Party	Labour	Conservative	Liberal Democrats
Seats before	22	9	2
Seats after	16	15	4
Seat change	▼6	▲6	▲2
Popular vote	6,280	6,160	1,743
Percentage	39.2%	38.4%	10.9%
Swing	▼6.0%	▲5.0%	▼2.0%
	Fourth party
Party	Independent
Seats before	1
Seats after	0
Seat change	▼1
Popular vote	1,838
Percentage	11.5%
Swing	▲3.0%
- Results of the 2003 North Warwickshire Borough council election. Conservatives in blue, Labour in red, and the Liberal Democrats in orange.

- Composition of the council after the election.
Council control before election
Labour
Council control after election
No overall control

On 1 May 2003, an election was held to elect councillors to the North Warwickshire Borough Council in the English Midlands. It took place on the same day as other local elections in the UK. It was the first election to take place under the new ward boundaries, with one extra seat from the previous 34 seats added. All 35 seats were up for election and the result was no overall control with the Labour Party having the most seats at 16. The previous election had resulted in the council being controlled by Labour.

The election also resulted in an independent politician losing their seat and the Liberal Democrats gaining two seats, despite seeing a decrease in their vote share. The Conservative Party made significant gains, winning 6 seats and seeing a 4.9% increase in their vote share. Labour lost 6 seats and saw a 6% decrease in their vote share.
