= 2019 North Warwickshire Borough Council election =

2019 UK local government election

- 2 May 2019

All 35 seats to North Warwickshire Borough Council 18 seats needed for a majority

	First party	Second party
Party	Conservative	Labour
Last election	22 seats, 44.0%	13 seats, 36.4%
Seats won	21	14
Seat change	▼1	▲1
Popular vote	16,266	12,358
Percentage	54.5%	41.4%
Swing	▲10.5%	▲5.0%
- Results of the 2019 North Warwickshire Borough council election
Council control before election
Conservative
Council control after election
Conservative

On 2 May 2019, an election took place to elect members of the North Warwickshire Borough Council in the English Midlands. It was held on the same day as other local elections in the UK. It resulted in the Conservative Party retaining control of the council.

Both the Conservative and Labour parties saw increases in their vote share, especially the former, which was likely due to UKIP losing nearly 20% of their vote share. The Conservatives lost one seat to Labour but still retained a majority of seats.

== Summary ==
=== Election result ===
2019 North Warwickshire Borough Council election
Party	Candidates	Seats	Gains	Losses	Net gain/loss	Seats %	Votes %	Votes	+/−
Conservative	35	21	2	3	▼1	60.0	54.5	16,266	+10.5
Labour	35	14	3	2	▲1	40.0	41.4	12,358	+5.0
UKIP	5	0	0	0	Steady	0.0	2.4	731	–15.3
Green	2	0	0	0	Steady	0.0	0.9	224	±0.0
Independent	1	0	0	0	Steady	0.0	0.7	221	–0.3

== Ward results ==
=== Arley and Whitacre ===
Arley and Whitacre
Party	Candidate	Votes	%	±%
Labour Co-op	Jodie Gosling	613	49.9	
Conservative	Kerry Parker	567	46.2	
Labour Co-op	Ann McLauchlan	562	45.8	
Conservative	Sandra Smith	523	42.6	
Conservative	Helen Zgraja	508	41.4	
Labour Co-op	Nigel Turley	484	39.4	
Majority				
Turnout		1,228		
Labour Co-op gain from Conservative				
Conservative hold				
Labour Co-op gain from Conservative				

=== Atherstone Central ===
Atherstone Central
Party	Candidate	Votes	%	±%
Labour Co-op	Neil Dirveiks	306	47.7	
Labour Co-op	Dawn Downes	261	40.7	
Conservative	Jodda Jordan	248	38.7	
Conservative	Daniel Hancocks	213	33.2	
Green	Luke Haslam	118	18.4	
Majority				
Turnout		641		
Labour Co-op hold				
Labour Co-op hold				

=== Atherstone North ===
Atherstone North
Party	Candidate	Votes	%	±%
Conservative	Ray Jarvis	403	43.2	
Conservative	Mejar Singh	371	39.8	
Labour Co-op	Sara Bishop	340	36.5	
Labour Co-op	Brian Henney	333	35.7	
UKIP	Robert Gisbourne	180	19.3	
UKIP	Richard Freer	156	16.7	
Majority				
Turnout		932		
Conservative hold				
Conservative hold				

=== Atherstone South and Mancetter ===
Atherstone South and Mancetter
Party	Candidate	Votes	%	±%
Conservative	Denise Clews	511	58.5	
Conservative	Tony Clews	482	55.1	
Labour Co-op	Susan Allan-Stubbs	354	40.5	
Labour Co-op	Martin Short	329	37.6	
Majority				
Turnout		874		
Conservative hold				
Conservative hold				

=== Baddesley and Grendon ===
Baddesley and Grendon
Party	Candidate	Votes	%	±%
Conservative	Andy Wright	718	60.6	
Conservative	Bernadette Davey	676	57.1	
Labour Co-op	John Moore	456	38.5	
Labour Co-op	Ian Driver	429	36.2	
Majority				
Turnout		1,184		
Conservative hold				
Conservative gain from Labour				

=== Coleshill North ===
Coleshill North
Party	Candidate	Votes	%	±%
Labour Co-op	Jack Deakin	433	53.9	
Labour Co-op	Jane Farrow	387	48.1	
Conservative	Richard Habgood	357	44.4	
Conservative	Julie Hobster	325	40.4	
Majority				
Turnout		804		
Labour Co-op hold				
Labour Co-op hold				

=== Coleshill South ===
Coleshill South
Party	Candidate	Votes	%	±%
Conservative	Caroline Symonds	552	53.5	
Conservative	Colin Hayfield	494	47.9	
Labour Co-op	Claire Breeze	378	36.7	
Labour Co-op	Chelsea Collis	332	32.2	
UKIP	David Williams	123	11.9	
UKIP	Mandy Williams	107	10.4	
Majority				
Turnout		1,031		
Conservative hold				
Conservative hold				

=== Curdworth ===
Curdworth
Party	Candidate	Votes	%	±%
Conservative	Mark Simpson	668	75.4	
Conservative	Shelly Lebrun	651	73.5	
Labour	Lauren Naylor	168	19.0	
Labour	Susan Hammond	161	18.2	
Majority				
Turnout		886		
Conservative hold				
Conservative hold				

=== Dordon ===
Dordon
Party	Candidate	Votes	%	±%
Labour Co-op	Jacky Chambers	387	54.3	
Labour Co-op	Peter Morson	326	45.7	
Conservative	David Hanratty	173	24.3	
UKIP	Stuart Taylor	165	23.1	
Conservative	Dan Welch	113	15.8	
Majority				
Turnout		713		
Labour Co-op hold				
Labour Co-op hold				

=== Fillongley ===
Fillongley
Party	Candidate	Votes	%	±%
Conservative	Leslie Smith	610	74.5	
Conservative	David Wright	542	66.2	
Labour Co-op	Susan Kelly	191	23.3	
Labour Co-op	Olwen Dutton	178	21.7	
Majority				
Turnout		819		
Conservative hold				
Conservative hold				

=== Hartshill ===
Hartshill
Party	Candidate	Votes	%	±%
Conservative	Margaret Bell	458	52.5	
Conservative	Barry Lees	389	44.6	
Labour Co-op	Cerys Howell	327	37.5	
Labour Co-op	Elinor Parsons	261	29.9	
Green	Ian Bourne	156	17.9	
Majority				
Turnout		872		
Conservative hold				
Conservative gain from Labour				

=== Hurley and Wood End ===
Hurley and Wood End
Party	Candidate	Votes	%	±%
Labour	Hayden Phillips	416	54.7	
Labour	Owen Phillips	371	48.8	
Conservative	Robert Hobster	327	43.0	
Conservative	Martin Watson	320	42.0	
Majority				
Turnout		761		
Labour hold				
Labour hold				

=== Kingsbury ===
Kingsbury
Party	Candidate	Votes	%	±%
Conservative	Andy Jenns	752	69.4	
Conservative	Brian Moss	632	58.4	
Labour	Patrick Silke	246	22.7	
Independent	Carol Ayasamy	221	20.4	
Labour	Alexandra Phillips	218	20.1	
Majority				
Turnout		1,083		
Conservative hold				
Conservative gain from Labour				

=== Newton Regis and Warton ===
Newton Regis and Warton
Party	Candidate	Votes	%	±%
Conservative	John Humphreys	579	56.8	
Conservative	Marian Humphreys	561	55.0	
Labour Co-op	Fin Wood	434	42.5	
Labour Co-op	Chris Clark	422	41.4	
Majority				
Turnout		1,020		
Conservative hold				
Conservative hold				

=== Polesworth East ===
Polesworth East
Party	Candidate	Votes	%	±%
Labour Co-op	Dave Parsons	588	69.8	
Labour Co-op	Adam Farrell	487	57.8	
Conservative	John Smitten	265	31.4	
Conservative	Karen Tracey	211	25.0	
Majority				
Turnout		843		
Labour Co-op hold				
Labour Co-op hold				

=== Polesworth West ===
Polesworth West
Party	Candidate	Votes	%	±%
Labour Co-op	Michael Osborne	354	48.4	
Labour Co-op	Simon Rose	351	48.0	
Conservative	Sue Hanratty	346	47.3	
Conservative	Richard Freakley	339	46.4	
Majority				
Turnout		731		
Labour Co-op hold				
Labour Co-op hold				

=== Water Orton ===
Water Orton
Party	Candidate	Votes	%	±%
Conservative	Dave Reilly	706	70.7	
Conservative	Judy MacDonald	676	67.7	
Labour	Daniel Hodkinson	280	28.1	
Labour	Alistair Brett	195	19.5	
Majority				
Turnout		998		
Conservative hold				
Conservative hold				
