= Orton on the Hill =

Village in Leicestershire, England

Coordinates: 52°38′N 01°33′W

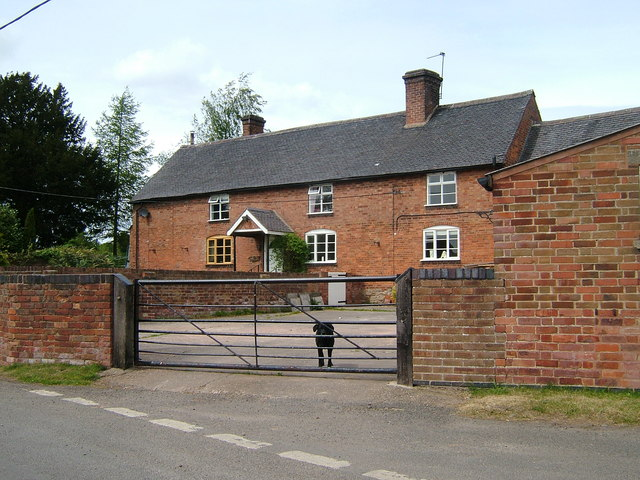
- Shaw Cross House

- Location within Leicestershire
- Civil parish: Twycross
- District: Hinckley and Bosworth
- Shire county: Leicestershire
- Region: East Midlands
- Country: England
- Sovereign state: United Kingdom
- Post town: ATHERSTONE
- Postcode district: CV9
- Dialling code: 01827

Orton on the Hill is a village and former civil parish, now in the parish of Twycross, in the Hinckley and Bosworth district of Leicestershire, England. Orton adjoins Morebarne, Sheepy and Newhouse Grange on the south, Appleby and Austrey to the east.

== History ==
The name "Orton" means 'Upper farm/settlement', the last part being from its high situation on a hill overlooking four counties.

=== Domesday Book ===
Orton on the Hill was recorded in the Domesday Book as Wortone. It was recorded in the possession of Henry the Earl Ferrers with six ploughs. This was one of the 35 lordships bestowed upon Henry de Ferrers by William the Conqueror who later ceded Orton (Overton) and Morebarne to the Cistercian abbey of Merevale.

=== Tudor times ===
In the Tudor period, according to John Nichols' survey, the manor belonged to the Bradshaw family, a citation of Robert Bradshaw being made in 1579. The diocesan census of 1564 records 31 families in the parish. In 1588 Robert Bradshaw owned the manor and the grange at Morebarne. The Knights Templar and the manor of Warton also held lands in the parish.

=== English Civil War ===
During the English Civil War Reverend Porter, the Vicar of Orton, appears to have harboured royalist sympathies and faced ejection. According to John Walker's chronicle of the Sufferings of the Clergy during the grand Rebellion, Porter was cited by the Committee for Compounding and faced sequestration. Mathew Mathews the new incumbent was appointed to administer the church, but when two sequestrators went to the vicarage house to take possession in July, 1647, Porter's mother denied them access. The key had also been taken from the church. Roger was imprisoned three times and plundered, later leaving him destitute with a wife and eleven children.

Orton was also visited by parliamentary troops from the local parliamentary garrisons who made off with horses. Captain Ottaway's soldiers from Coventry garrison took horses from Mr Robinson and John Orton. Soldiers from Tamworth took a gelding and two mares from Mr Porter, the vicar, in November, 1643.

=== Modern history ===
Orton on the Hill was formerly a civil parish and formerly in the Sparkenhoe hundred. On 1 April 1935 the parish was abolished and merged with Twycross.

== Population ==
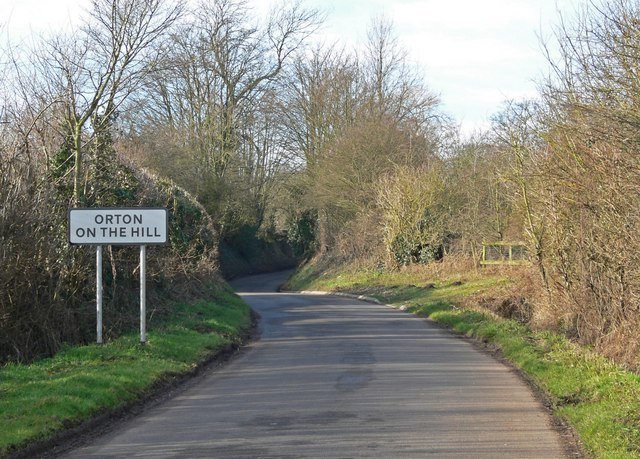
Approaching the village

About 1,000 acres (4.0 km^{2}) in Orton were enclosed in 1782. Not long after, in 1786, most of the old Orton Hall was taken down and rebuilt. According to the parliamentary census of 1792 there were 330 inhabitants and 58 dwellings, as compared to only three houses in Orton Parva. According to the parliamentary census returns the population had decreased to 303 inhabitants by 1801, and 279 inhabitants by 1811.

In 1931 the parish had a population of 191.
