= 1999 North Warwickshire Borough Council election =

1999 UK local government election

- 6 May 1999

All 34 seats to North Warwickshire Borough Council 18 seats needed for a majority
- Turnout: 34.3% ▼6.2 pp

	First party	Second party	Third party
Party	Labour	Conservative	Liberal Democrats
Seats before	28	4	0
Seats after	22	9	2
Seat change	▼6	▲5	▲2
Popular vote	11,814	7,099	4,822
Percentage	45.2%	33.5%	12.9%
Swing	▼18.8%	▲4.3%	▲9.2%
	Fourth party
Party	Independent
Seats before	1
Seats after	1
Seat change	0
Popular vote	1,303
Percentage	8.5%
Swing	▲5.4%
- Composition of the council after the election.
Council control before election
Labour
Council control after election
Labour

On 6 May 1999, an election was held to elect councillors to the North Warwickshire Borough Council in the English Midlands. It took place on the same day as other local elections in the UK. It resulted in the Labour Party keeping control of the council. All 34 seats were up for election in all wards.

The Liberal Democrats also gained two seats in this election with an independent politician keeping their seat. The Conservative Party also made gains, winning 5 more seats than the last election. Labour lost almost 19% of their vote share.
