= 2011 North Warwickshire Borough Council election =

2011 UK local government election

- 5 May 2011

All 35 seats to North Warwickshire Borough Council 18 seats needed for a majority
- Turnout: 43.7% ▲4.9 pp

	First party	Second party
Party	Labour	Conservative
Seats before	15	20
Seats after	18	17
Seat change	▲3	▼3
Popular vote	9,748	10,021
Percentage	47.7%	49.0%
Swing	▲9.7%	▼0.4%
- Results of the 2011 North Warwickshire Borough council election. Conservatives in blue and Labour in red.

- Composition of the council after the election.
Council control before election
Conservative
Council control after election
Labour

An election was held on 5 May 2011 to elect councillors to the North Warwickshire Borough Council in the English Midlands.

A total of 35 seats were up for election, all councillors from all wards. The previous election produced a majority for the Conservative Party.

== Election result ==
These elections saw Labour narrowly win with a majority of just one seat but losing the overall popular vote to the Conservatives. The number of close results in so many wards perhaps is the reason for this.

The Conservatives lost four seats at these elections, in the following wards.

- Arley and Whitacre, where Labour gained the second seat, and also came 18 votes short of winning the third seat.
- Atherstone Central, where Labour retained the seat they won at the last council elections in 2007 and additionally retained their March 2009 by-election gain of the one Conservative seat in the ward.
- Coleshill North, where Labour gained the first seat, while coming 17 votes short of winning the other seat. This was the first time Labour won a seat in this ward since 1995.
- Polesworth West, where Labour gained the Conservative seat, while retaining the seat Labour held in 2003 and 2007.

The number of seats could have flipped the other way if the Conservatives managed to have won in Atherstone North, where both of the Conservative candidates received 522 votes, which was 32 votes behind taking the second seat in that ward, which bizarrely wasn't one of the four seats the Conservatives lost at these elections. Even more astonishingly, Atherstone North had never elected a Conservative councillor in the entirety of the borough council's existence, and would not do so until the following elections in 2015, which coincided with the North Warwickshire parliamentary constituency, which incorporates all of the North Warwickshire borough except for 2 wards (Arley & Whitacre and Hartshill), as well as five Nuneaton and Bedworth wards (Bede, Exhall, Heath, Poplar, and Slough) being held by the Conservatives with an increased majority at the general election on the same day.

== Ward results ==
Arley and Whitacre Ward (3 Councillors)
Party	Candidate	Votes	%	±%
Conservative	Karen Barber	852		
Conservative	Pam Coton	730		
Conservative	Carol Fox	788		
Independent	Richard John Hancocks	252		
Labour	Sharon Jane Moss	770		
Labour	Harry Thomas George Taylor	770		
Labour	Nigel Ivor Turley	823		
Majority				
Turnout				
		Swing		

Atherstone Central Ward (2 Councillors)
Party	Candidate	Votes	%	±%
Conservative	Denise Sandra Clews			
Labour	Lorna Elizabeth Dirveiks			
Labour	Neil Adrian David Dirveiks			
Conservative	Tony Wright			
Majority				
Turnout				
		Swing		

Atherstone North Ward (2 Councillors)
Party	Candidate	Votes	%	±%
Conservative	Gill Davis			
Labour	Anne Forwood			
Labour	Derek Nicholas Alfred Pickard			
Conservative	Martin George Shaw			
Majority				
Turnout				
		Swing		

Atherstone South and Mancetter Ward (2 Councillors)
Party	Candidate	Votes	%	±%
Conservative	Martin Cyril Davis			
Conservative	Lorraine Freer			
Labour	Ray Jarvis			
Labour	Ceri Short			
Majority				
Turnout				
		Swing		

Baddesley and Grendon Ward (2 Councillors)
Party	Candidate	Votes	%	±%
Conservative	Margaret Anne Manley			
Labour	John Sidney Moore			
Conservative	Mel Smith			
Labour	Ray Sweet			
Majority				
Turnout				
		Swing		

Coleshill North Ward (2 Councillors)
Party	Candidate	Votes	%	±%
Conservative	Jeremy Bowden			
Labour	Adam Joseph Farrell			
Labour	Dominic Charles Ferro			
Conservative	Peter John Fowler			
Majority				
Turnout				
		Swing		

Coleshill South Ward (2 Councillors)
Party	Candidate	Votes	%	±%
Labour	Christopher David Bain			
Labour	Claire Breeze			
Conservative	Gordon James Thomas Sherratt			
Conservative	Andrew Watkins			
Majority				
Turnout				
gain from		Swing		

Curdworth Ward (2 Councillors)
Party	Candidate	Votes	%	±%
Labour	Celia Banner			
Labour	Mike Banner			
Conservative	Joan Lea			
Conservative	Mark Simpson			
Majority				
Turnout				
		Swing		

Dordon Ward (2 Councillors)
Party	Candidate	Votes	%	±%
UKIP	Steve Fowler			
Conservative	Dave Hanratty			
Conservative	Sue Hanratty			
Labour	Peter Frank Morson			
Labour	John George Winter			
Majority				
Turnout				
		Swing		

Fillongley Ward (2 Councillors)
Party	Candidate	Votes	%	±%
Labour	Roger Ball			
Conservative	Colin Charles Hayfield			
Labour	Mary Phillips			
Conservative	Leslie John Smith			
Majority				
Turnout				
		Swing		

Hartshill Ward (2 Councillors)
Party	Candidate	Votes	%	±%
Conservative	Kath Johnston			
Labour	Carmel Mary Morson			
Labour	Kieren Luke Moss			
Conservative	Tim Wykes			
Majority				
Turnout				
gain from		Swing		

Hurley and Wood End Ward (2 Councillors)
Party	Candidate	Votes	%	±%
Conservative	Richard Freer			
Labour	Ann Lewis			
Independent	Tony Moppett			
Labour	Hayden Albert Phillips			
Conservative	Howard Smith			
Independent	Ian Frederick Thomas			
Majority				
Turnout				
gain from		Swing		

Kingsbury Ward (2 Councillors)
Party	Candidate	Votes	%	±%
Independent	Carol Ann Ayasamy			
Independent	Andrew Roy Jenns			
Conservative	Dave Moffatt			
Labour	Brian Peter Moss			
Labour	Margaret Ceridwen Moss			
Conservative	Stuart Swan			
Majority				
Turnout				
gain from		Swing		

Newton Regis and Warton Ward (2 Councillors)
Party	Candidate	Votes	%	±%
Conservative	David John Humphreys			
Conservative	Tilly May			
Labour	Owen George Phillips			
Labour	Eleanor Mary Pugh			
Majority				
Turnout				
		Swing		

Polesworth East Ward (2 Councillors)
Party	Candidate	Votes	%	±%
Conservative	Karen Marie Mercer-West			
Conservative	Colin Walter Peat			
Labour	Mick Stanley			
Labour	Yvette Karen Stanley			
Majority				
Turnout				
		Swing		

Polesworth West Ward (2 Councillors)
Party	Candidate	Votes	%	±%
Labour	Dave Butcher			
Conservative	Lee Clarke			
Conservative	Wendy Christine Smitten			
Labour	Alison Helen Stanley			
Majority				
Turnout				
		Swing		

Water Orton Ward (2 Councillors)
Party	Candidate	Votes	%	±%
Labour	Tom Foley			
Labour	Dan Hodkinson			
Conservative	Allan Francis Holland			
Conservative	Ray Pyne			
Majority				
Turnout				
gain from		Swing		
