= 2023 North Warwickshire Borough Council election =

2023 English local election

- 4 May 2023

All 35 seats to North Warwickshire Borough Council 18 seats needed for a majority
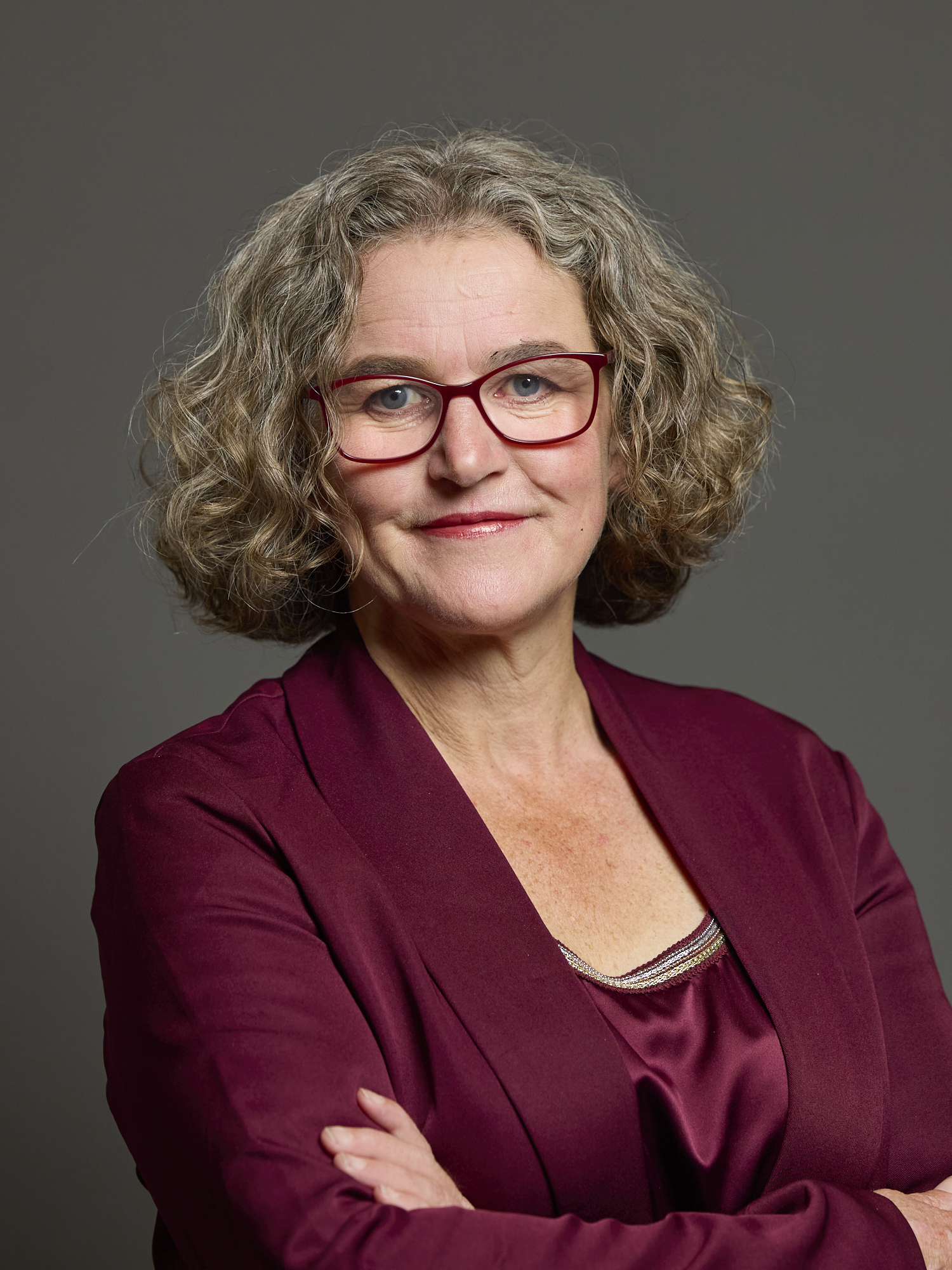
	First party	Second party	Third party
Leader	David Wright	Jodie Gosling
Party	Conservative	Labour	Independent
Leader's seat	Fillongley	Arley and Whitacre
Last election	21 seats, 54.5%	14 seats, 41.4%	0 seats, 0.7%
Seats before	23	11 (Note: Including one vacant seat previously held by Labour councillor Jack Deakin prior to his resignation in December 2022.)	1
Seats won	17	15	3
Seat change	▼4	▲1	▲3
Popular vote	13,785	13,595	1,608
Percentage	47.0%	46.4%	5.5%
Swing	▼7.5%	▲5.0%	▲4.8%
- Winner of each seat at the 2023 North Warwickshire Borough Council election
Leader before election
David Wright
Conservative
Leader after election
David Wright
Conservative
No overall control

An election took place on 4 May 2023 to elect all 35 members of the North Warwickshire Borough Council in the English Midlands. This took place on the same days as other UK local elections.

== Summary ==
Prior to the election the council was under Conservative majority control. Following the results, the Conservatives remained the largest party but lost their majority, leaving the council under no overall control. The Conservatives were able to form a minority administration with the support of two of the three independent councillors.

== Overall result ==
2023 North Warwickshire Borough Council election
Party	Candidates	Seats	Gains	Losses	Net gain/loss	Seats %	Votes %	Votes	+/−
Conservative	33	17	1	5	▼4	48.6	47.0	13,785	–7.5
Labour	35	15	4	3	▲1	42.9	46.4	13,595	+5.0
Independent	5	3	3	0	▲3	8.6	5.5	1,608	+4.8
Green	1	0	0	0	Steady	0.0	0.5	160	–0.4
Heritage	1	0	0	0	Steady	0.0	0.5	151	N/A

== Ward results ==
The results for each ward were as follows, with an asterisk (*) indicating an incumbent councillor standing for re-election:

=== Arley and Whitacre ===
Arley and Whitacre (3 seats)
Party	Candidate	Votes	%	±%
Labour	Jodie Gosling*	767	59.1	+9.2
Labour	Michaela Jackson	623	48.0	+2.2
Labour	Nigel Turley	594	45.8	+6.4
Conservative	Heather Norgrove	507	39.1	–3.5
Conservative	Chris Jones	462	35.6	–5.8
Conservative	Kerry Parker*	419	32.3	–13.9
Heritage	Peter Downes	151	11.6	N/A
Turnout		1,297	28.9	
Registered electors		4,488		
Labour hold				
Labour gain from Conservative				
Labour hold				

=== Atherstone Central ===
Atherstone Central (2 seats)
Party	Candidate	Votes	%	±%
Labour	Neil Dirveiks*	413	64.9	+17.2
Labour	Rachel Taylor	403	63.4	+22.7
Conservative	Mark Jordan	216	34.0	–4.7
Conservative	Pauline Gurney	184	28.9	–4.3
Turnout		636	22.0	
Registered electors		2,895		
Labour hold				
Labour hold				

=== Atherstone North ===
Atherstone North (2 seats)
Party	Candidate	Votes	%	±%
Conservative	Ray Jarvis*	394	49.4	+6.2
Conservative	Mejar Singh*	378	47.4	+7.6
Labour	Derek Pickard	369	46.3	+9.8
Labour	Joshua Smith	350	43.9	+8.2
Turnout		797	28.1	
Registered electors		2,839		
Conservative hold				
Conservative hold				

=== Atherstone South and Mancetter ===
Atherstone South and Mancetter (2 seats)
Party	Candidate	Votes	%	±%
Labour	Martin Barnett	453	51.5	+11.0
Conservative	Denise Clews*	421	47.9	–10.8
Labour	Michael Stanley	401	45.6	+8.0
Conservative	Tony Clews*	399	45.4	–9.7
Turnout		879	30.0	
Registered electors		2,931		
Labour gain from Conservative				
Conservative hold				

=== Baddesley and Grendon ===
Baddesley and Grendon (2 seats)
Party	Candidate	Votes	%	±%
Conservative	Andy Wright*	637	56.3	–4.3
Conservative	Bernadette Davey*	583	51.5	–5.6
Labour	Martin Sharp	482	42.6	+4.1
Labour	Nathan Sweet	432	38.2	+2.0
Turnout		1,131	33.0	
Registered electors		3,425		
Conservative hold				
Conservative hold				

=== Coleshill North ===
Coleshill North (2 seats)
Party	Candidate	Votes	%	±%
Labour	Jane Farrow*	400	52.5	+4.4
Conservative	Peter Fowler	369	48.4	+4.0
Labour	Adam Richardson	339	44.5	–9.4
Conservative	Colin Lewis	315	41.3	+0.9
Turnout		762	30.6	
Registered electors		2,494		
Labour hold				
Conservative gain from Labour				

=== Coleshill South ===
Coleshill South (2 seats)
Party	Candidate	Votes	%	±%
Conservative	Caroline Symonds*	533	59.8	+6.3
Conservative	Colin Hayfield*	416	46.6	–1.3
Labour	Alistair Brett	305	34.2	–2.5
Labour	Keith Brown	304	34.1	+1.9
Turnout		892	32.0	
Registered electors		2,786		
Conservative hold				
Conservative hold				

=== Curdworth ===
Curdworth (2 seats)
Party	Candidate	Votes	%	±%
Conservative	Sandra Smith	566	63.7	–11.7
Conservative	Martin Watson	521	58.7	–14.8
Labour	Celia Banner	220	24.8	+5.8
Labour	Michael Banner	171	19.3	+1.1
Green	Joshua Harris	160	18.0	N/A
Turnout		888	33.2	
Registered electors		2,675		
Conservative hold				
Conservative hold				

=== Dordon ===
Dordon (2 seats)
Party	Candidate	Votes	%	±%
Independent	Byron Melia	411	65.6	N/A
Independent	Davina Ridley	361	57.6	N/A
Labour	Peter Morson*	218	34.8	–10.9
Labour	Alexandra Phillips	173	27.8	–26.7
Turnout		627	27.5	
Registered electors		2,283		
Independent gain from Labour				
Independent gain from Labour				

=== Fillongley ===
Fillongley (2 seats)
Party	Candidate	Votes	%	±%
Conservative	Mark Simpson	597	70.1	–4.4
Conservative	David Wright*	556	65.3	–0.9
Labour	John Doyle	225	26.4	+3.1
Labour	Daniel Hodkinson	215	25.2	+3.5
Turnout		852	31.1	
Registered electors		2,744		
Conservative hold				
Conservative hold				

=== Hartshill ===
Hartshill (2 seats)
Party	Candidate	Votes	%	±%
Conservative	Margaret Bell*	436	53.0	+0.5
Labour	Katie Holby	412	50.1	+12.6
Labour	Elinor Parsons	345	41.9	+12.0
Conservative	Marli Parker	325	39.5	–5.1
Turnout		823	29.1	
Registered electors		2,832		
Conservative hold				
Labour gain from Conservative				

=== Hurley and Wood End ===
Hurley and Wood End (2 seats)
Party	Candidate	Votes	%	±%
Labour	Hayden Phillips*	521	57.7	+3.0
Labour	Owen Phillips*	521	57.7	+8.9
Conservative	John Given	360	39.9	–3.1
Conservative	Damien Holt	302	33.4	–8.6
Turnout		903	30.5	
Registered electors		2,960		
Labour hold				
Labour hold				

=== Kingsbury ===
Kingsbury (2 seats)
Party	Candidate	Votes	%	±%
Conservative	Andy Jenns*	569	68.9	–0.5
Conservative	Debbie Bates	410	49.6	–8.8
Labour	Philip Page	222	26.9	+4.2
Labour	Smita Jalaf	175	21.2	+1.1
Independent	Suzanne Ayasamy	111	13.4	–7.0
Turnout		826	29.0	
Registered electors		2,851		
Conservative hold				
Conservative hold				

=== Newton Regis and Warton ===
Newton Regis and Warton (2 seats)
Party	Candidate	Votes	%	±%
Conservative	Dave Humphreys*	526	48.5	–8.3
Labour	Brynnen Ririe	525	48.4	+5.9
Conservative	Marian Humphreys*	520	47.9	–7.1
Labour	Faye Whapples	494	45.5	+4.1
Turnout		1,085	35.1	
Registered electors		3,090		
Conservative hold				
Labour gain from Conservative				

=== Polesworth East ===
Polesworth East (2 seats)
Party	Candidate	Votes	%	±%
Labour	Dave Parsons*	532	62.8	–7.0
Labour	Neil Chapman	401	47.3	–10.5
Conservative	Dan Hancocks	326	38.5	+7.4
Conservative	Jack Bayley	269	31.8	+6.8
Turnout		847	28.9	
Registered electors		2,932		
Labour hold				
Labour hold				

=== Polesworth West ===
Polesworth West (2 seats)
Party	Candidate	Votes	%	±%
Labour	Emma Whapples	403	56.7	+8.7
Labour	Michael Osborne*	394	55.4	+7.0
Conservative	Sue Hanratty	283	39.8	–7.5
Conservative	Suzanne Hancocks	267	37.6	–8.8
Turnout		711	29.0	
Registered electors		2,448		
Labour hold				
Labour hold				

=== Water Orton ===
Water Orton (2 seats)
Party	Candidate	Votes	%	±%
Independent	Steve Stuart	433	48.3	N/A
Conservative	David Reilly*	384	42.9	–27.8
Conservative	Michael Lee	335	37.4	–30.3
Independent	Feli Freeman	292	32.6	N/A
Labour	Tom Foley	164	18.3	–9.8
Labour	John Broughton	89	9.9	–9.6
Turnout		896	33.2	
Registered electors		2,701		
Independent gain from Conservative				
Conservative hold				

== By-elections ==
=== Arley and Whitacre ===
Arley & Whitacre by-election: 1 May 2025
Party	Candidate	Votes	%	±%
Reform	Susan Guilmant	703	45.2	N/A
Labour	Elinor Parsons	292	18.8	–35.0
Conservative	Neal Pointon	280	18.0	–17.6
Independent	Carolyn McKay	236	15.2	N/A
Heritage	Peter Downes	44	2.8	–7.8
Majority		411	26.4	N/A
Turnout		1,564	34.0	+5.1
Registered electors		4,595		
Reform gain from Labour				

=== Atherstone Central ===
Atherstone Central by-election: 1 May 2025
Party	Candidate	Votes	%	±%
Reform	Steven Watson	378	48.6	N/A
Conservative	Tony Clews	186	23.9	–10.4
Labour	Dawn Wilkinson	157	20.2	–45.5
Green	Joshua Wickham-Young	56	7.2	N/A
Majority		193	24.7	N/A
Turnout		778	26.5	+4.5
Registered electors		2,934		
Reform gain from Labour				
