= No Man's Heath, Warwickshire =

Coordinates: 52.6772°N 1.5719°W

No Man's Heath
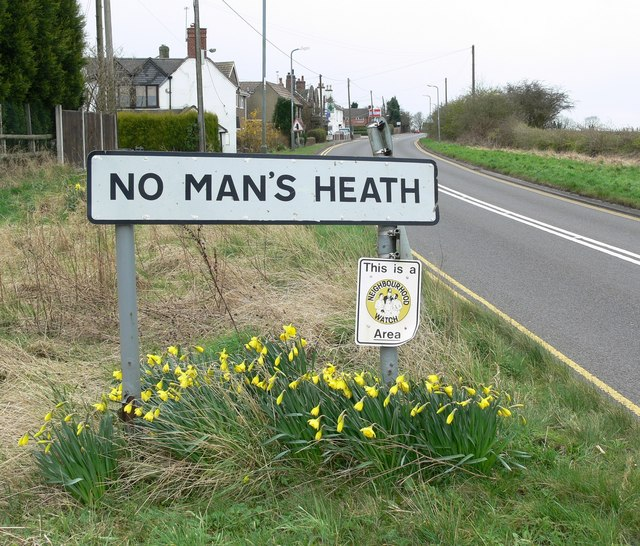

- Location within Warwickshire
- OS grid reference: SK288090
- Civil parish: Newton Regis
- District: North Warwickshire
- Shire county: Warwickshire
- Region: West Midlands
- Country: England
- Sovereign state: United Kingdom
- Post town: Tamworth
- Postcode district: B79
- Police: Warwickshire
- Fire: Warwickshire
- Ambulance: West Midlands

No Man's Heath is an area of the civil parish of Newton Regis, in the North Warwickshire district, in the county of Warwickshire, England, about 6 miles (9.7 km) northeast of Tamworth. It is near the boundaries of four English counties: Derbyshire, Leicestershire, Warwickshire and Staffordshire. Nearby in the late 19th century were Netherseal Colliery and Netherseal Hall. Today a small village exists here, also called No Man's Heath, which is the northernmost settlement in Warwickshire. No-Mans-Heath was formerly an extra-parochial tract, in 1858 No Mans Heath became a separate civil parish, on 24 March 1888 the parish was abolished and merged with Newton Regis. In 1881 the parish had a population of 70. The county boundary which used to divide the village between Leicestershire and Warwickshire has been re-drawn on 1 April 1965 to place the whole village in Warwickshire.

The village has an Indian restaurant called The Four Counties Spice; this used to be the village public house, called The Four Counties Inn.

Leicestershire, Warwickshire, and Staffordshire meet about 0.5 miles (800 m) northwest of the village. Derbyshire, Leicestershire, and Staffordshire meet a further half-mile northwest. There is an ancient (probably Mercian) stone, divided into four parts, which may mark the point where the four counties met before boundary adjustments.

== See also ==
- Dow Bridge, meeting point of Warwickshire, Northamptonshire and Leicestershire.
- Four Shire Stone, meeting point of Warwickshire, Oxfordshire and Gloucestershire (historically also Worcestershire)
