= Newton Regis =

Village in Warwickshire, England

Coordinates: 52.664°N 1.592°W

- St. Mary's parish church

- Location within Warwickshire
- Population: 588 (2021)
- OS grid reference: SK277074
- Civil parish: Newton Regis
- District: North Warwickshire
- Shire county: Warwickshire
- Region: West Midlands
- Country: England
- Sovereign state: United Kingdom
- Post town: Tamworth
- Postcode district: B79
- Police: Warwickshire
- Fire: Warwickshire
- Ambulance: West Midlands

Newton Regis is a village and civil parish in the North Warwickshire district of Warwickshire, England. It had a population of 588 at the 2021 Census.

== History ==
The history of Newton Regis begins in the reign of Henry II (1154–89). Before that it was a part of the now smaller village or hamlet of Seckington. Newton Regis is not specifically mentioned in the Domesday Book, but it has been suggested that 2½ hides were held in 1086 in Seckington that correspond to present Newton Regis. The church was once a chapel to the earlier church at Seckington, which does occur in the Domesday Book. In 1159 Newton appears in records for the first time, when land is recorded as granted to Geoffrey Savage. There have been many landowners down the ages, and the manor was held at times by several people at once. In the 18th and 19th centuries two landowning families, the Burdetts and the Inges owned most of Newton Regis.

Their seats of power were respectively Bramcote Hall, now a ruin near Warton, and Thorpe Hall, the seat of the present Inge-Innes-Lillingstons in Thorpe Constantine. Newton Regis has also been known as Kings Newton, and in the 18th century picturesquely as Newton-in-the-Thistles. The thistles might have been in fact teasels, used in the processing of flax for linen production. St Mary's church in Newton Regis dates from the 13th and 14th centuries with a 15th-century porch. It has many interesting features including a squint or “leper window”, a 15th-century gravestone of a priest and some fine stained glass windows. The lychgate is also the village war memorial dating from 1928.

== Education ==
Newton Regis Church of England Primary School opened in 1995 and has a nursery. It has about 80 pupils.

== Sport ==
Newton Thistle FC plays in the Tamworth Sunday Football League. The team strip is blue with white stripes, white shorts and yellow socks. They ceased playing in 2013. Austrey & Newton Regis Junior Cricket Club Tamworth 3rd & 4th teams.

== Places of interest ==
- St. Mary's parish church
- Queen's Head public house.

== See also ==
- Regis (Place)
- List of place names with royal patronage in the United Kingdom
