= Polesworth =

Village in Warwickshire, England

Coordinates: 52.61516°N 1.61743°W

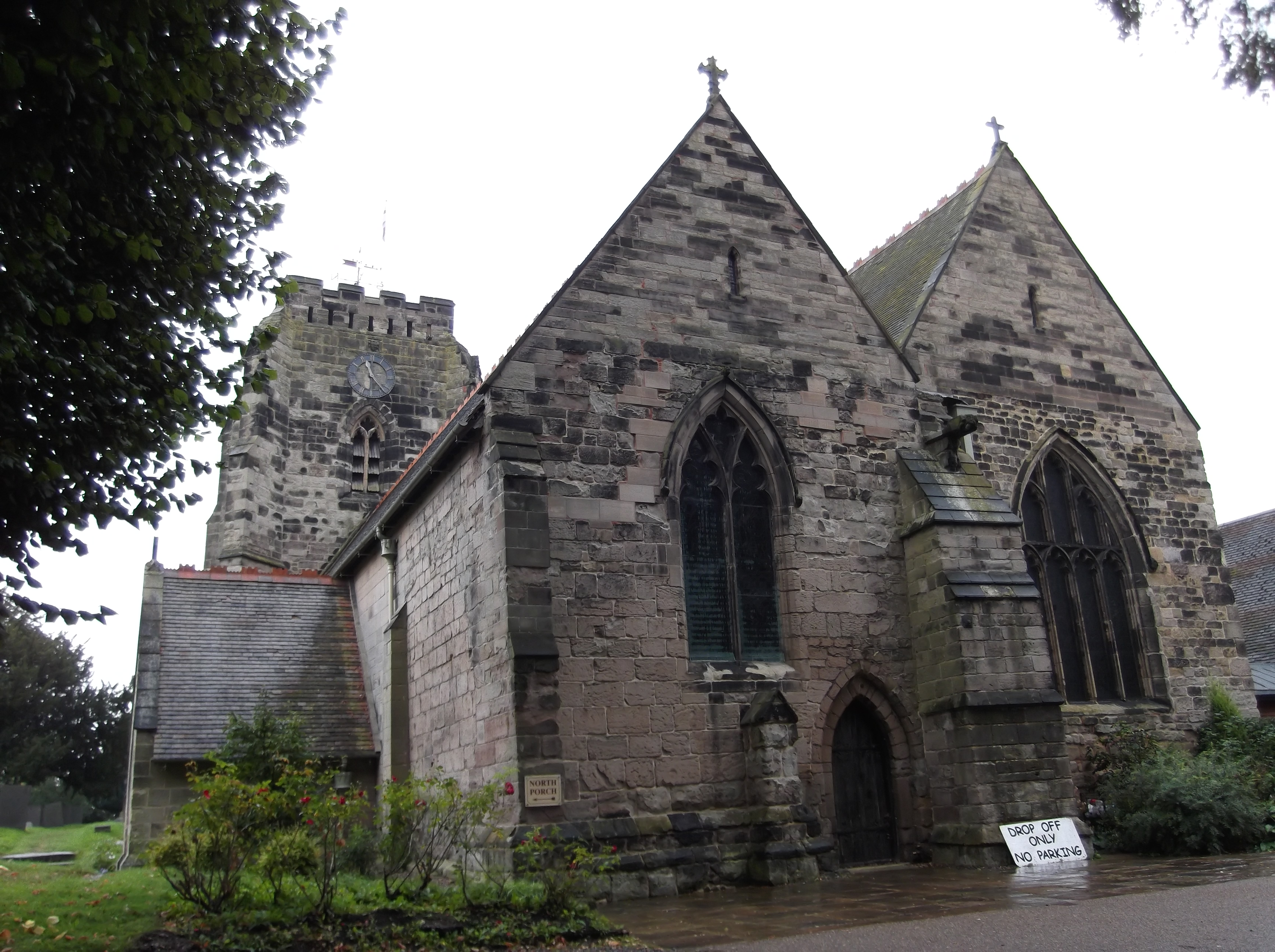
- Abbey Church of St Editha

- Location within Warwickshire
- Population: 8,727 (parish 2021); 9,913 (built-up area 2021)
- OS grid reference: SK2602
- Civil parish: Polesworth
- District: North Warwickshire
- Shire county: Warwickshire
- Region: West Midlands
- Country: England
- Sovereign state: United Kingdom
- Post town: TAMWORTH
- Postcode district: B78
- Dialling code: 01827
- Police: Warwickshire
- Fire: Warwickshire
- Ambulance: West Midlands
- UK Parliament: North Warwickshire and Bedworth

Polesworth is a large village and civil parish in the North Warwickshire district of Warwickshire, England. It is situated close to the northern tip of the county, adjacent to the border with Staffordshire. It is 3 miles (5 km) east of Tamworth, 4.5 miles (7 km) northwest of Atherstone and 15 miles (24 km) northeast of Birmingham.

In the 2021 census, the civil parish of Polesworth had a population of 8,727; it included the contiguous sub-villages of Birchmoor, St Helena and Hall End directly to the south, with Warton to the east. The built-up area of Polesworth, which includes the adjoining village of Dordon to the south, had a population of 9,913 in 2021. The border with Leicestershire is 3 miles (5 km) to the east, while Derbyshire is 6 miles (10 km) to the north. The River Anker runs through the village.

== History ==
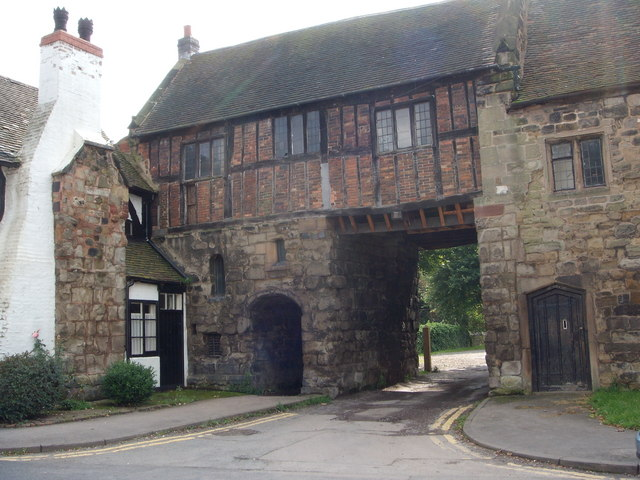
Polesworth Abbey Gateway

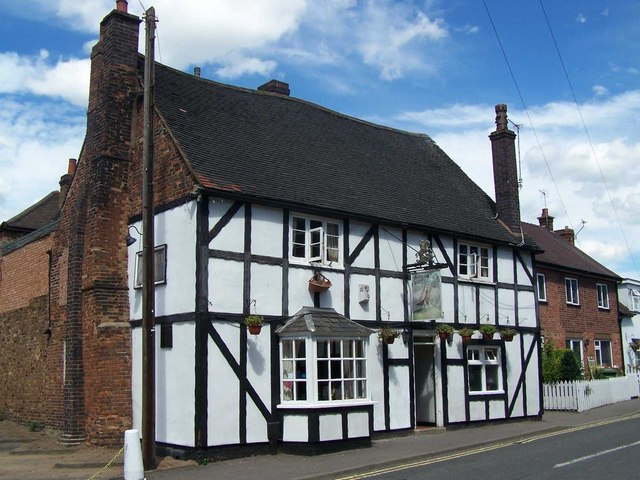
The Spread Eagle, Polesworth

The name Polesworth is derived from "pol" meaning a "pool" and "worth" meaning "a dwelling" or enclosure in the Old English language.

The village was once the site of Polesworth Abbey, which was founded in 827 by King Egbert with his daughter Editha (later Saint Editha) as Abbess. It prospered for 700 years, but was disbanded as part of the Dissolution of the Monasteries. In 1544 the lands of the Abbey were granted by the Crown to Francis Goodere, who used the stones of the Abbey to build a manor house; Polesworth Hall.

Henry Goodere, son of Francis, was a patron of the arts and Polesworth Hall was a centre of culture during Elizabethan times. The poet Michael Drayton was in the service of the Goodere family around 1580, and his works contain allusions to Polesworth and the River Anker. Other notable figures including the dramatist Ben Jonson, architect Inigo Jones and poet John Donne, made up the core of an elite group who became known as the Polesworth Circle. It is also rumoured that William Shakespeare spent time at Polesworth. Polesworth Hall no longer exists, as it was demolished in around 1870 and replaced by the vicarage.

In around 1509, Thomas Cockayne constructed Pooley Hall, which today includes some of the oldest brickwork in the country. The hall still exists and overlooks Pooley View. That part of the hall known as Pooley Farm was once the home of the late American Soul and Motown singer Edwin Starr, famous for the song War.

During the English Civil War, Polesworth and Wilnecote are listed among the towns paying arrears to the Parliamentary garrison at Tamworth. In an account drawn up by a Captain Thomas Layfield, for the period from 1 November 1645 to 1 May 1646, Polesworth (being rated at £8 a week) was assessed at and paid £196.16.0 while Wilnecote (at £2 a week) paid £50.7.0.

When the Coventry Canal was built through Polesworth in the 1770s, the village developed a coal-mining and clay industry and the population underwent rapid growth. During the Second World War, opencast coal-mining devastated the surrounding countryside, and caused the River Anker to be diverted. Mining in the area has since disappeared. 62.5 hectares of the site of the former Pooley Hall colliery which closed in 1965 has been transformed into Pooley Country Park.

== Transport ==
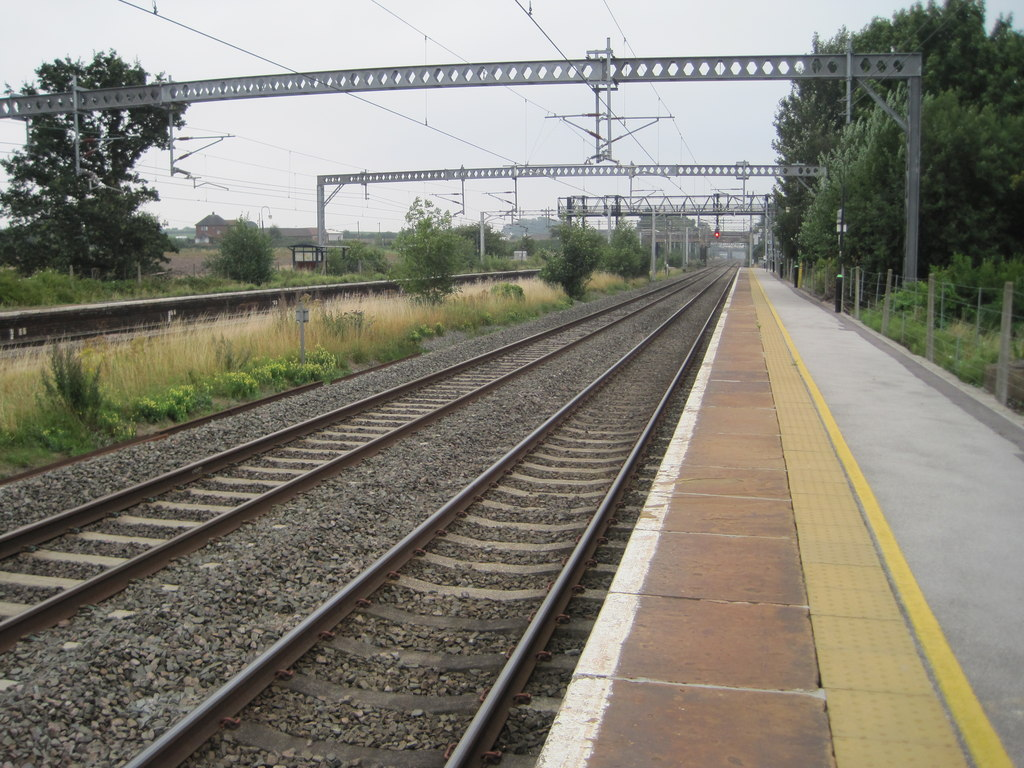
Polesworth railway station on the West Coast Main Line

The Trent Valley section of the West Coast Main Line runs just to the north of the village; Polesworth railway station is a stop on this line. However, the station has received only a Parliamentary service of just one train per day since 2005; this is because only the northbound platform is accessible, as the footbridge to the southbound platform was removed during upgrade works to the line and was not replaced. A Northampton to Crewe service calls at 06:48. The nearest fully operational stations are Tamworth and Atherstone, both within 5 miles (8.0 km).

Polesworth is served on Fridays and Weekends by bus route 65a between Tamworth and Nuneaton, operated by Arriva Midlands North.

The M42 motorway runs just to the west of Polesworth and the A5 road runs just to the south.

The Coventry Canal runs through Polesworth.

== Education ==
The main primary school in Polesworth is the Nethersole Primary School; it has existed since the mid-17th century (albeit at a different location) having been founded by a local benefactor Sir Francis Nethersole as a free school for the poor of Polesworth.

The main secondary school serving the area is The Polesworth School, in the adjacent village of Dordon.

== Culture ==
The Polesworth Poets Trail is an attraction which highlights the famous poets who were once associated with the village. The trail consists of strategically placed poems at various locations around the local area.

== Notable residents ==
- Meghan Beesley (born 1989) - Athlete
- Ellis Cross (born 1996) - Runner
- Michael Drayton (1563–1631) - Poet
- Henry Goodere (1534–1595) - Nobleman
- Francis Nethersole (1587–1659) - Diplomat, politician
- Denis Alva Parsons (1934–2012) - Sculptor
- Saint Edith of Polesworth (10th century) - Abbess
- Edwin Starr (1942–2003) - Soul and Motown singer
