= North Warwickshire =

Coordinates: 52.5760°N 1.5454°W

Borough of North Warwickshire
- Borough and non-metropolitan district
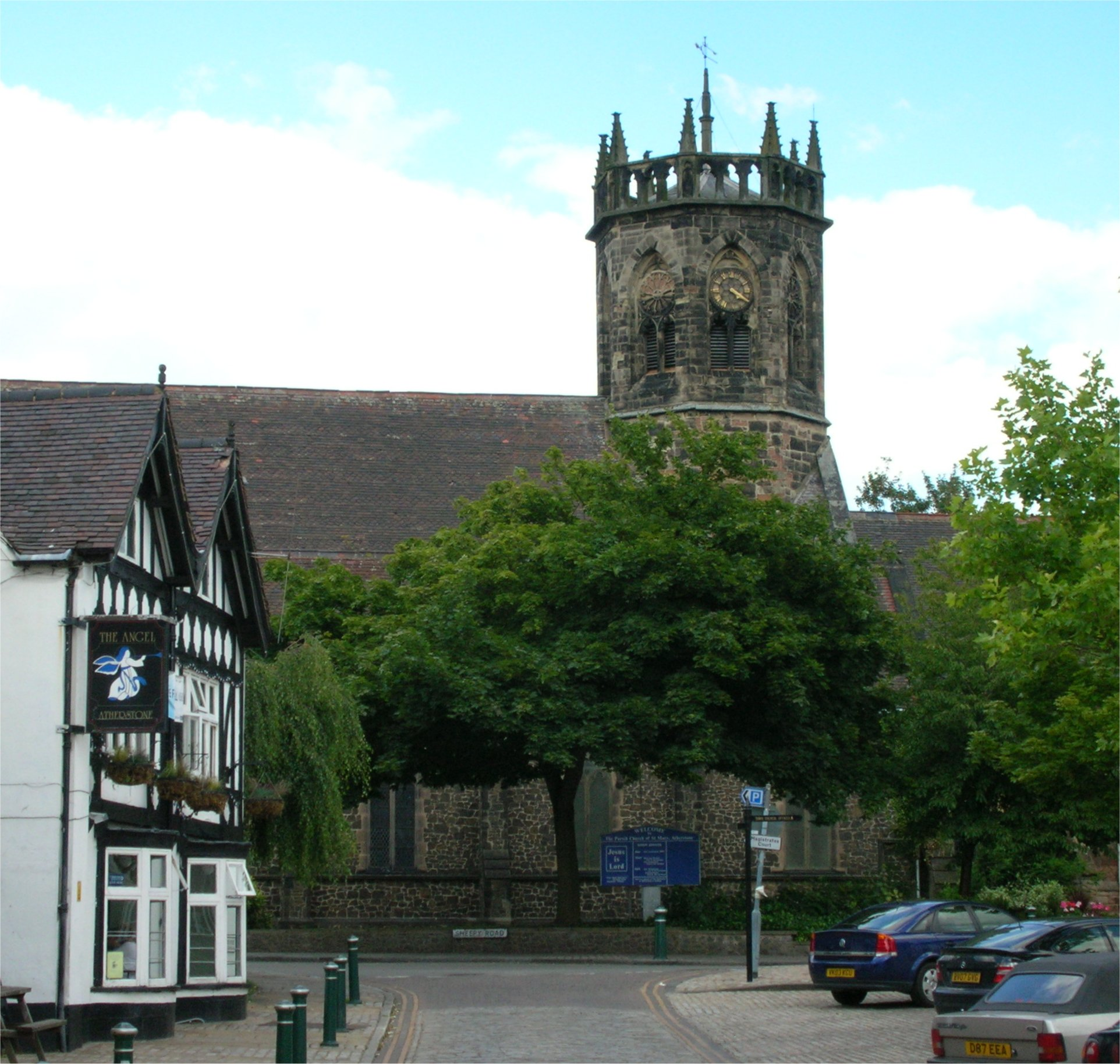
- Atherstone, the administrative centre of the borough and one of the two towns

- Shown within Warwickshire
- Sovereign state: United Kingdom
- Constituent country: England
- Region: West Midlands
- Administrative county: Warwickshire
- Founded: 1 April 1974
- Admin. HQ: Atherstone

Government
  - Type: Non-metropolitan district
  - MPs: Rachel Taylor; Jodie Gosling

Area
  - Total: 110 sq mi (284 km^{2})
  - Rank: 123rd

Population (2024)
  - Total: 67,117
  - Rank: Ranked 288th
  - Density: 612/sq mi (236/km^{2})

Ethnicity (2021)
  - Ethnic groups: List: 96.1% White; 1.7% Mixed; 1.3% Asian; 0.6% Black; 0.3% other

Religion (2021)
  - Religion: List: 55% Christianity; 38.1% no religion; 0.4% Islam; 0.3% Hinduism; 0.1% Judaism; 0.5% Sikhism; 0.2% Buddhism; 0.4% other; 5% not stated
- Time zone: UTC+0 (Greenwich Mean Time)
  - Summer (DST): UTC+1 (British Summer Time)
- Postcode: B46 ,B79 ,B78, CV7, CV9, CV10
- ONS code: 44UB (ONS); E07000218 (GSS)

North Warwickshire is a local government district with borough status in Warwickshire, England. The borough includes the two towns of Atherstone (where the council is based) and Coleshill, and the large villages of Hartshill, Kingsbury, Mancetter, Polesworth and Water Orton along with smaller villages and surrounding rural areas.

The area historically had a large coal mining industry, but the last coal mine in the area, Daw Mill at Arley, closed in 2013. The borough's landscape is primarily of the mildly undulating agricultural variety, with the North Warwickshire plateau rising to 177 m (581 ft) above sea-level at Bentley Common, 2.5 miles southwest of Atherstone. The most significant bodies of water within North Warwickshire are Kingsbury Water Park, Shustoke Reservoir, the River Blythe and the mid-section of the Coventry Canal.

The neighbouring districts are Nuneaton and Bedworth, Coventry, Solihull, Birmingham, Lichfield, Tamworth, North West Leicestershire and Hinckley and Bosworth.

== History ==
The district was created on 1 April 1974 under the Local Government Act 1972, by a merger of one previous district with part of another, these were:

- Atherstone Rural District
- Meriden Rural District (remainder split between Solihull and Coventry in the new West Midlands county)

The new district was named North Warwickshire, reflecting its position in the wider county. The district was awarded borough status from its creation, allowing the chair of the council to take the title of mayor.

== Abolition ==
Under current local government reorganisation plans, all district councils in Warwickshire, as well as the county council, will be abolished in 2028, with the district forming part of a new North Warwickshire unitary authority, also including the areas of the Rugby and Nuneaton and Bedworth districts.

== Governance ==
North Warwickshire Borough Council

Type
- Type: Non-metropolitan district

Leadership
- Mayor: Davina Ridley, Independent since 13 May 2026
- Leader: David Wright, Conservative since March 2020
- Chief Executive: Steve Maxey since March 2019

Structure
- Seats: 35 councillors
- Graph of the party split among 35 seats.
- Political groups: Administration (17) Conservative (17) Other parties (18) Labour (11) Reform (2) Independent (5)
- Length of term: 4 years

Elections
- Voting system: First past the post
- Last election: 4 May 2023

Meeting place
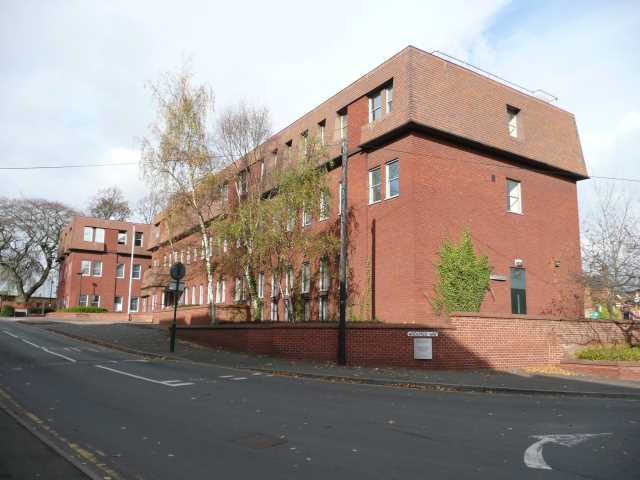
- Council House, South Street, Atherstone, CV9 1DE

Website
- www.northwarks.gov.uk

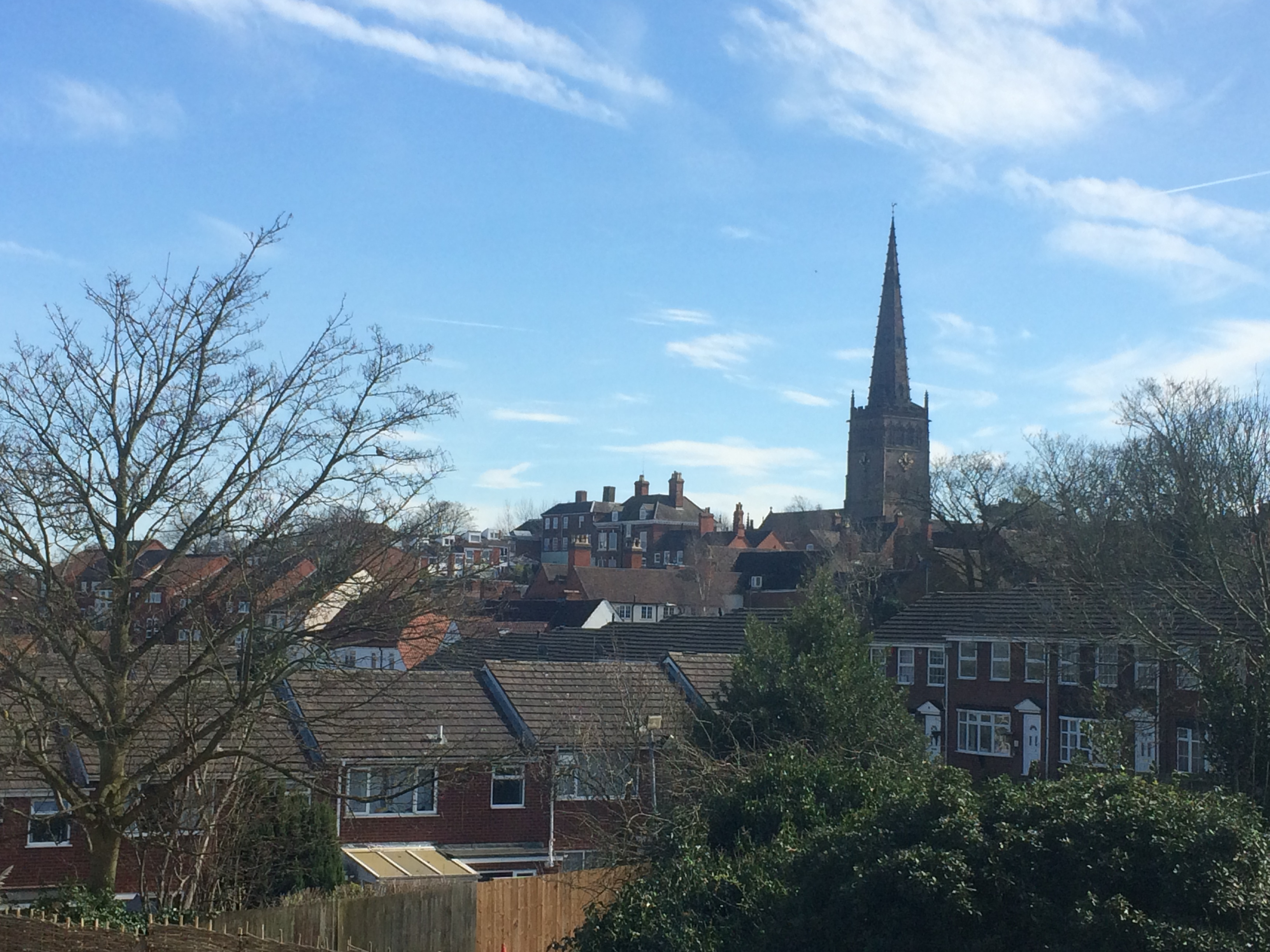
Coleshill, the other town of the borough

North Warwickshire Borough Council provides district-level services. County-level services are provided by Warwickshire County Council. The whole borough is also covered by civil parish, which form a third tier of local government.

=== Political control ===
The council has been under no overall control since the 2023 election, being led by a Conservative minority administration with informal support from two of the three independent councillors.

The first elections to the council were held in 1973, initially operating as a shadow authority alongside the outgoing authorities until the new arrangements came into effect on 1 April 1974. Political control of the council since 1974 has been as follows:

Party in control	Years
Labour	1974–1976
No overall control	1976–1979
Labour	1979–2003
No overall control	2003–2007
Conservative	2007–2011
Labour	2011–2015
Conservative	2015–2023
No overall control	2023–present

=== Leadership ===
The role of mayor is largely ceremonial in North Warwickshire. Political leadership is instead provided by the leader of the council. The leaders since 2009 have been:

Councillor	Party	From	To
Colin Hayfield	Conservative	pre-2009	2011
Mick Stanley	Labour	18 May 2011	2015
David Humphreys	Conservative	20 May 2015	Mar 2020
David Wright	Conservative	Mar 2020	

=== Composition ===
Following the 2023 election, and subsequent by-elections and changes of allegiance up to May 2025, the composition of the council was:

Party	Councillors
Conservative	17
Labour	11
Reform	2
Independent	5
Total	35

Two of the independent councillors form the "Dordon Independents" group, which supported the Conservatives in forming a minority administration in May 2023, and the other three independents form the "North Warwickshire Independent Representatives" group.

=== Elections ===
Since the last boundary changes in 2003 the council has comprised 35 councillors representing 17 wards with each ward electing two councillors except the Arley and Whitacre ward, which elects three. Elections are held every four years.

=== Premises ===
The council is based at the Council House on South Street in Atherstone. The building was purpose-built for the council and opened in 1979.

== Towns and parishes ==
The whole district is covered by 33 civil parishes. The parish councils for Atherstone and Coleshill have declared their parishes to be towns, allowing them to take the style "town council". Some of the parishes share a grouped parish council. The parishes are:

- Ansley
- Arley
- Astley
- Atherstone
- Austrey
- Baddesley Ensor
- Baxterley
- Bentley (Note: Shares grouped parish council with Merevale)
- Caldecote
- Coleshill
- Corley
- Curdworth
- Dordon
- Fillongley
- Great Packington (Note: Shares grouped parish council with Little Packington)
- Grendon
- Hartshill
- Kingsbury
- Lea Marston
- Little Packington (Note: Shares grouped parish council with Great Packington)
- Mancetter
- Maxstoke
- Merevale (Note: Shares grouped parish council with Bentley)
- Middleton
- Nether Whitacre
- Newton Regis (Note: Shares grouped parish council with Seckington)
- Over Whitacre
- Polesworth
- Seckington (Note: Shares grouped parish council with Newton Regis)
- Shustoke
- Shuttington
- Water Orton
- Wishaw

== Media ==
=== Television ===
North Warwickshire is served by BBC West Midlands and ITV Central with television signals received from the Sutton Coldfield TV transmitter.

=== Radio ===
Radio stations for the area are:

- BBC CWR
- BBC Radio WM
- Capital Midlands
- Heart West Midlands
- Smooth West Midlands
- Hits Radio Coventry & Warwickshire
- Greatest Hits Radio Midlands

== Coat of arms ==
The council was granted a coat of arms in 1976.

== See also ==
- List of wards in North Warwickshire
