= Grade II* listed buildings in North Warwickshire =

North Warwickshire shown within Warwickshire

There are over 20,000 Grade II* listed buildings in England. This page is a list of these buildings in the district of North Warwickshire in Warwickshire.

== North Warwickshire ==
Name	Location	Type	Completed (Note: The date given is the date used by Historic England as significant for the initial building or that of an important part in the structure's description.)	Date designated	Grid ref. (Note: Sometimes known as OSGB36, the grid reference is based on the British national grid reference system used by the Ordnance Survey.) Geo-coordinates	Entry number (Note: The "List Entry Number" is a unique number assigned to each listed building and scheduled monument by Historic England.)	Image
Church of St Lawrence	Church End, Ansley, North Warwickshire	Church	Mid to late 12th century	25 March 1968	SP2901392637; 52°31′51″N 1°34′25″W	1365141	Church of St Lawrence More images
Church of St Wilfred	Old Arley, Arley, North Warwickshire	Church	14th century	30 March 1988	SP2832190618; 52°30′46″N 1°35′03″W	1034773	Church of St Wilfred More images
Astley Castle	Astley Castle, Astley, North Warwickshire	Country House	Mid 16th century	11 November 1952	SP3116289485; 52°30′09″N 1°32′33″W	1365144	Astley Castle More images
Stable block at Astley Castle	Astley Castle, Astley, North Warwickshire	Stable	Mid to late 18th century	11 November 1952	SP3114789392; 52°30′06″N 1°32′33″W	1034777	Stable block at Astley Castle More images
Beech House and attached Railings	Atherstone, North Warwickshire	Row	1708	25 March 1968	SP3085297896; 52°34′41″N 1°32′46″W	1185175	Upload Photo
Church of St Mary	Atherstone, North Warwickshire	Church	14th century	25 March 1968	SP3084497969; 52°34′43″N 1°32′47″W	1365164	Church of St Mary More images
Church of St Nicholas	Austrey, North Warwickshire	Church	Late 13th century	22 July 1953	SK2957906282; 52°39′12″N 1°33′51″W	1365184	Church of St Nicholas More images
Church of St Theobald and Saint Chad	Caldecote, North Warwickshire	Church	Late 13th century	25 March 1968	SP3487295124; 52°33′10″N 1°29′14″W	1034744	Church of St Theobald and Saint Chad More images
Cole Bridge	Coleshill, North Warwickshire	Road Bridge	Mid 16th century	8 September 1961	SP1992589513; 52°30′11″N 1°42′28″W	1034701	Cole Bridge More images
Church of St Mary	Corley, North Warwickshire	Parish Church	Early 12th century	8 September 1961	SP3012085113; 52°27′47″N 1°33′29″W	1299365	Church of St Mary More images
Corley Hall and attached Wall and Gatepiers	Corley, North Warwickshire	House	17th century	11 November 1952	SP3046685724; 52°28′07″N 1°33′11″W	1034864	Upload Photo
Church of St Nicholas and St Peter	Curdworth, North Warwickshire	Church	Late 12th century	8 September 1961	SP1779292811; 52°31′58″N 1°44′21″W	1185754	Church of St Nicholas and St Peter More images
Church of St Mary and All Saints	Fillongley, North Warwickshire	Church	12th century	8 September 1961	SP2808887171; 52°28′54″N 1°35′16″W	1034830	Church of St Mary and All Saints More images
Stone House Farmhouse	Fillongley, North Warwickshire	Farmhouse	19th century	23 March 1988	SP2610587742; 52°29′13″N 1°37′01″W	1034866	Stone House Farmhouse More images
Packington Hall	Packington Park, Great Packington, North Warwickshire	Country House	Late 17th century	11 November 1952	SP2227683820; 52°27′07″N 1°40′25″W	1116473	Packington Hall More images
Packington Old Hall with Walls adjoining on East and West Sides, Courtyard Wall adjoining at Rear, and attached Outbuildings	Packington Park, Great Packington, North Warwickshire	House	1679	11 November 1952	SP2308484616; 52°27′32″N 1°39′42″W	1034811	Packington Old Hall with Walls adjoining on East and West Sides, Courtyard Wall adjoining at Rear, and attached Outbuildings More images
Church of All Saints	Grendon, North Warwickshire	Church	12th century	25 March 1968	SK2872000918; 52°36′19″N 1°34′38″W	1034716	Church of All Saints More images
Grendon Bridge (that Part in Grendon Civil Parish) Grendon Bridge (that Part in Polesworth Civil Parish)	Grendon, North Warwickshire	Bridge	15th century	23 November 1951	SK2845000986; 52°36′21″N 1°34′53″W	1186247	Grendon Bridge (that Part in Grendon Civil Parish) Grendon Bridge (that Part in Polesworth Civil Parish)
Hartshill Grange	Hartshill, North Warwickshire	House	Early 18th century	25 November 1969	SP3299894731; 52°32′58″N 1°30′53″W	1034749	Upload Photo
Church of Saint Peter and Saint Paul	Kingsbury, North Warwickshire	Church	12th century	22 July 1953	SP2147696265; 52°33′50″N 1°41′05″W	1034683	Church of Saint Peter and Saint Paul More images
Kingsbury Hall	Kingsbury, North Warwickshire	Manor House	c. 1500	22 July 1953	SP2138896321; 52°33′51″N 1°41′09″W	1116550	Kingsbury Hall More images
Mancetter Manor and attached Gatepier	Mancetter, North Warwickshire	Double Ended Hall House	Extended	23 November 1951	SP3203296623; 52°33′59″N 1°31′44″W	1185415	Mancetter Manor and attached Gatepier More images
Church of St Michael and All Angels	Maxstoke, North Warwickshire	Church	Early 14th century	8 September 1961	SP2359286863; 52°28′45″N 1°39′15″W	1365128	Church of St Michael and All Angels More images
Churchyard Cross 6 Metres South East of Church of St Michael and All Angels	Maxstoke, North Warwickshire	Cross	14th century	23 March 1988	SP2360486850; 52°28′45″N 1°39′14″W	1116121	Churchyard Cross 6 Metres South East of Church of St Michael and All Angels More images
Inner Precinct Wall approximately 100 Metres West of Priory Farmhouse	Maxstoke, North Warwickshire	Mill House	1336	8 September 1961	SP2340286795; 52°28′43″N 1°39′25″W	1034821	Upload Photo
Outer Gatehouse and attached Precinct Walls and Barn 200 Metres North of Priory Farmhouse	Maxstoke, North Warwickshire	Precinct Wall	14th century	8 September 1961	SP2345286889; 52°28′46″N 1°39′22″W	1365129	Outer Gatehouse and attached Precinct Walls and Barn 200 Metres North of Priory Farmhouse
Precinct Wall, West of Outer Gatehouse	Maxstoke, North Warwickshire	Precinct Wall	Early 14th century	8 September 1961	SP2333886904; 52°28′46″N 1°39′28″W	1116038	Precinct Wall, West of Outer Gatehouse
Precinct Wall, East of Outer Gatehouse and Bounding Churchyard of St Michael and All Saints on the West	Maxstoke, North Warwickshire	Precinct Wall	Early 14th century	8 September 1961	SP2353886890; 52°28′46″N 1°39′17″W	1034823	Precinct Wall, East of Outer Gatehouse and Bounding Churchyard of St Michael and All Saints on the West
Priory Farmhouse	Maxstoke, North Warwickshire	House	Late 16th century	11 November 1952	SP2345086833; 52°28′44″N 1°39′22″W	1116105	Priory Farmhouse
Remains of Tower and Walls of Monastic Church approximately 250 Metres South of Priory Farmhouse	Maxstoke, North Warwickshire	Church	1336	8 September 1961	SP2344586742; 52°28′41″N 1°39′22″W	1320105	Remains of Tower and Walls of Monastic Church approximately 250 Metres South of Priory Farmhouse
West Wall of Former Infirmary, approximately 150 Metres South of Priory Farmhouse	Maxstoke, North Warwickshire	Augustinian Monastery	Early 14th century	8 September 1961	SP2348086776; 52°28′42″N 1°39′21″W	1034822	Upload Photo
Merevale Hall	Merevale Park, Merevale, North Warwickshire	Country House	Late 17th century	25 March 1968	SP2953697350; 52°34′23″N 1°33′56″W	1299654	Merevale Hall More images
Remains of Merevale Abbey	Merevale, North Warwickshire	Abbey	1148	23 November 1951	SP2922797783; 52°34′37″N 1°34′13″W	1365173	Upload Photo
Stable Block and attached Forecourt Walls, Gatepiers and Gates at Merevale Hall	Merevale Park, Merevale, North Warwickshire	Gate	1835-42	1 November 1959	SP2953397289; 52°34′21″N 1°33′56″W	1185536	Upload Photo
Church of St John the Baptist	Middleton, North Warwickshire	Church	Mid 12th century	26 January 1989	SP1768198346; 52°34′58″N 1°44′26″W	1034640	Church of St John the Baptist More images
House approximately 50 Metres North East of Middleton Hall	Middleton Park, Middleton, North Warwickshire	House	c. 1600	26 January 1989	SP1930698162; 52°34′51″N 1°42′59″W	1365197	Upload Photo
Middleton Hall	Middleton Park, Middleton, North Warwickshire	Country House	Early 18th century	26 January 1989	SP1925498097; 52°34′49″N 1°43′02″W	1365196	Middleton Hall More images
Botts Green Hall	Botts Green, Nether Whitacre, North Warwickshire	Jettied House	1593	11 November 1952	SP2439692508; 52°31′48″N 1°38′31″W	1365198	Botts Green Hall
Walls, Towers and Gateway enclosing Whitacre Hall	Nether Whitacre, North Warwickshire	Moat	Early 16th century	11 November 1952	SP2413793674; 52°32′25″N 1°38′44″W	1365199	Upload Photo
Church of St Mary	Newton Regis, North Warwickshire	Church	Early 13th century	22 July 1953	SK2791907468; 52°39′51″N 1°35′19″W	1116451	Church of St Mary More images
Church of St Leonard	Over Whitacre, North Warwickshire	Church	1766	8 September 1961	SP2545791028; 52°31′00″N 1°37′35″W	1115596	Church of St Leonard More images
Hoar Hall	Over Whitacre, North Warwickshire	House	1732	23 March 1988	SP2595591954; 52°31′29″N 1°37′08″W	1034798	Hoar Hall More images
Abbey Gatehouse	Polesworth, North Warwickshire	Abbey	Late 14th century	23 November 1951	SK2629102554; 52°37′12″N 1°36′47″W	1262202	Abbey Gatehouse More images
Church of St Editha	Polesworth, North Warwickshire	Church	11th century ORIGINS	25 March 1968	SK2633202433; 52°37′09″N 1°36′45″W	1252564	Church of St Editha More images
Gate House	Polesworth, North Warwickshire	House	Later	23 November 1951	SK2631002562; 52°37′13″N 1°36′46″W	1252594	Upload Photo
Pooley Hall, attached Former Chapel and Pooley Hall Farmhouse	Polesworth, North Warwickshire	Farmhouse	1988	23 November 1951	SK2588502817; 52°37′21″N 1°37′09″W	1365179	Pooley Hall, attached Former Chapel and Pooley Hall Farmhouse More images
22 High Street	Polesworth, North Warwickshire	House	Late 16th century	25 March 1968	SK2628302553; 52°37′12″N 1°36′48″W	1252595	Upload Photo
Church of All Saints	Seckington, North Warwickshire	Church	mid/late 13th century	22 July 1953	SK2601807417; 52°39′50″N 1°37′00″W	1252599	Church of All Saints More images
Church of St Cuthbert	Shustoke, North Warwickshire	Church	Late 13th century	8 September 1961	SP2429690990; 52°30′59″N 1°38′36″W	1320424	Church of St Cuthbert More images
Priory Farmhouse	Shustoke, North Warwickshire	Farmhouse	Late 15th century	23 March 1988	SP2271490929; 52°30′57″N 1°40′00″W	1320436	Priory Farmhouse More images
Shustoke Hall Farmhouse	Shustoke, North Warwickshire	House	1988	23 March 1988	SP2339390019; 52°30′27″N 1°39′24″W	1266022	Upload Photo
Moat, Bridges and Gatepiers at Shustoke Hall Farmhouse	Shustoke, North Warwickshire	Moat	c. 1686	11 November 1952	SP2339390001; 52°30′27″N 1°39′24″W	1226189	Upload Photo
Church of St Chad	Wishaw, North Warwickshire	Church	13th century	8 September 1961	SP1767794570; 52°32′55″N 1°44′27″W	1034654	Church of St Chad More images
