= Castle Bromwich Rural District =

Rural district in Warwickshire, England

Coordinates: 52.522°N 1.802°W

Castle Bromwich was a rural district in Warwickshire, England, from 1894 to 1912.

It was created by the Local Government Act 1894 based on the Aston rural sanitary district, and consisted of the parishes of Castle Bromwich, Curdworth, Minworth, Water Orton and Wishaw. The district was abolished in 1912, and the parishes added to the Meriden Rural District.
