= Meriden Rural District =

Former local government area in the UK

Coordinates: 52.45°N 1.65°W

Meriden RD
- History
  - Created: 1894
  - Abolished: 1974
  - Succeeded by: Solihull North Warwickshire Coventry
- Status: Rural district
  - HQ: Meriden

The Meriden Rural District was a rural district of Warwickshire, England, which existed between 1894 and 1974. It was named after the village of Meriden.

Various boundary changes occurred to the district over the years. It gained area from the abolished Castle Bromwich Rural District in 1912. In 1932, it was enlarged by the abolition of the Nuneaton Rural District, the Foleshill Rural District and the Solihull Rural District. It also lost territory as the county boroughs of Solihull and Coventry expanded their boundaries.

The district was abolished in 1974 under the Local Government Act 1972. Part of it to the south was merged with the Solihull county borough and Coventry to become part of the new Metropolitan Borough of Solihull and City of Coventry in the new West Midlands county. Part of it to the north was merged with the Atherstone Rural District to become part of North Warwickshire.

At the time of its abolition in 1974 Meriden RD consisted of the following civil parishes:

- Allesley
- Balsall
- Barston
- Berkswell
- Bickenhill
- Castle Bromwich
- Chelmsley Wood
- Coleshill
- Corley
- Coundon
- Curdworth
- Fillongley
- Fordbridge
- Great Packington
- Hampton-in-Arden
- Keresley
- Kingshurst
- Kinwalsey
- Lea Marston
- Little Packington
- Maxstoke
- Meriden
- Middleton
- Minworth
- Nether Whitacre
- Over Whitacre
- Sheldon
- Shustoke
- Water Orton
- Wishaw
