= Ralph Ardern =

English politician

Ralph Ardern, or Ralph de Ardern (c. 1374 – c. 1420), was Member of Parliament for Worcestershire from March 1406. He was the son of Henry de Ardern who had previously held the seat in November 1381. He died sometime before 28 October 1420.

He was a Deputy High Sheriff of Worcestershire from 4 November 1404 to 27 November 1405.

Some time between the death of his father, Henry de Ardern in 1382 and the death of his mother in 1408 Ralph Ardern inherited the manors of Little Inkberrow and Wyke Sapy in Worcestershire and Barcheston, Park Hall near Castle Bromwich, Peddimore and property at Curdworth and Sutton Coldfield in Warwickshire.

In 1409 he granted land at Crofton Hackett to a John Richards.
