= Little Inkberrow =

Village in Worcestershire, England

Coordinates: 52.219°N 1.994°W

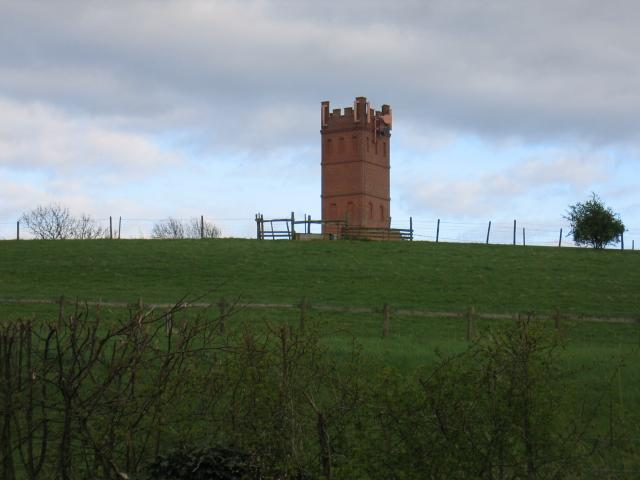
Inkberrow tower, Little Inkberrow. The tower was built in 1996 to disguise a mobile phone antenna

Little Inkberrow is a village in Worcestershire, England.

Ralph Ardern inherited the Worcestershire manor of Little Inkberrow between 1382 (the death of his father, Henry de Ardern) and 1408 (the death of his mother).
