= Moxhull Hall =

Coordinates: 52.5622°N 1.7606°W

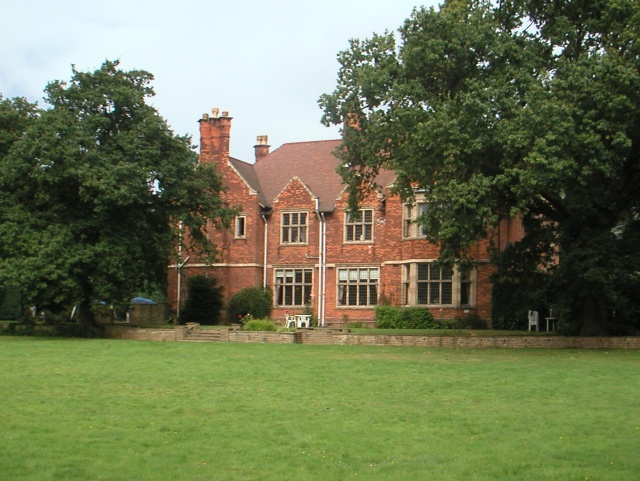
The present Moxhull Hall

Moxhull Hall is a hotel, wedding and conference venue in Wishaw, near Sutton Coldfield, in Warwickshire, England.

The manor of Moxhull was owned by the Lisle family from the 16th century and later by the Hackett family. The last Andrew Hackett died in 1815 and his widow married Berkeley Octavious Noel, a grandson of the 4th Earl of Gainsborough. Their son sold the estate to Thomas Ryland.

The original manor house, which stood in Moxhull Park, now the site of The De Vere Belfry Hotel and Golf Centre, was destroyed by fire in about 1900. Losses in the fire included a fine oak staircase which had been installed from Kenilworth Castle in 1760.

The then Lord of the manor, Howard Ryland, Lord Lieutenant of Warwickshire, built a new Manor House, Moxhull Hall, a short distance away at Holly Lane, Wishaw. His grandson, Thomas Howard Ryland, sold the estate in 1926 and it fell into the ownership of two other owners until, in 1969, Moxhull Hall was converted into a hotel.
