= Kinwalsey =

Coordinates: 52.4629°N 1.6256°W

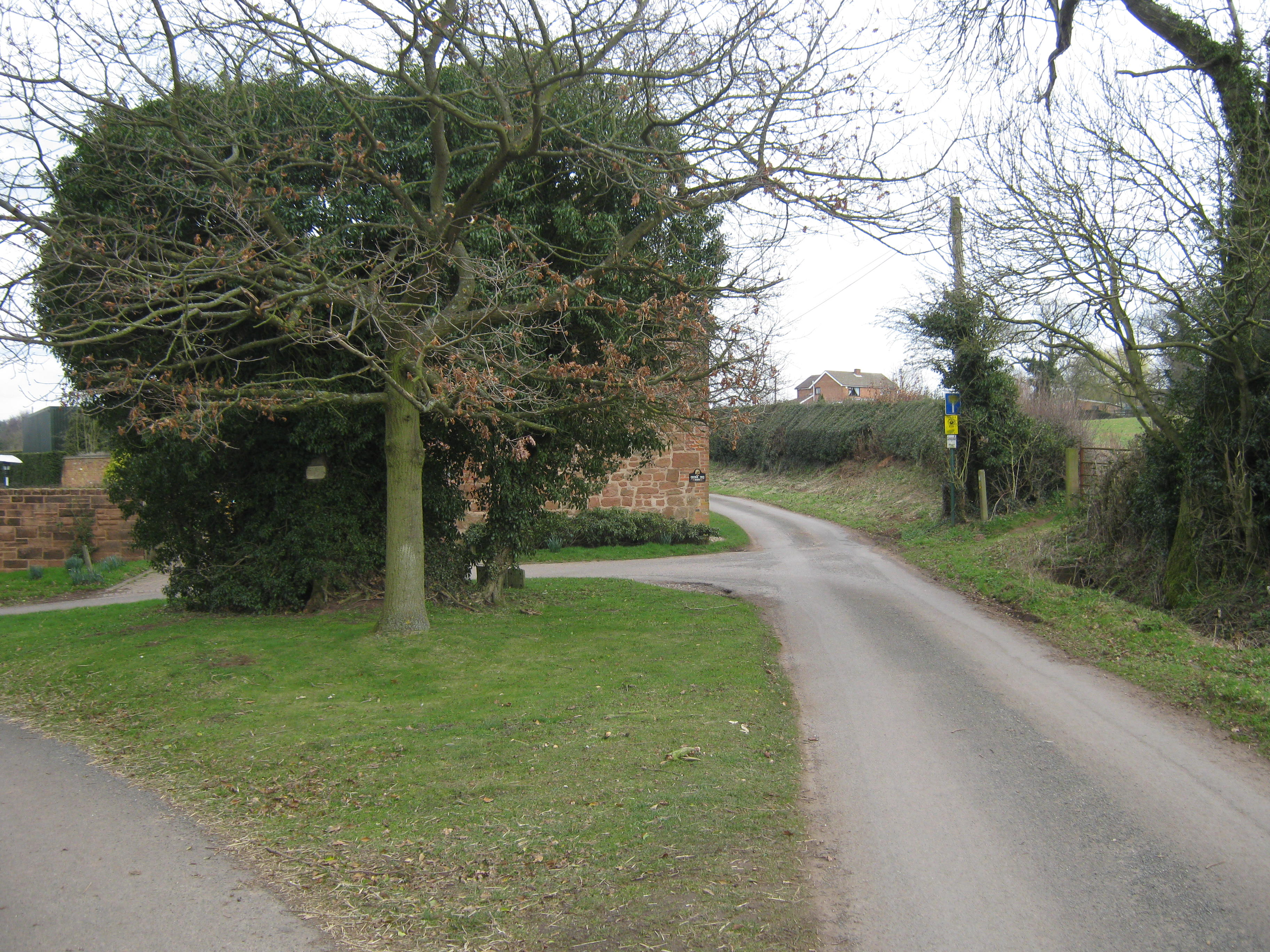
- Kinwalsey Lane

- Location within Warwickshire
- Civil parish: Fillongley
- District: North Warwickshire
- Shire county: Warwickshire
- Region: West Midlands
- Country: England
- Sovereign state: United Kingdom

Kinwalsey is a hamlet in the civil parish of Fillongley, in the North Warwickshire district, in the county of Warwickshire, England. It is about 12 miles from Birmingham. In 1891 the parish had a population of 15.

== History ==
The name "Kinwalsey" means 'Cyneweald's enclosure'. Kinwalsey was formerly in the parish of Hampton-in-Arden, in 1866 Kinwalsey became a separate civil parish and became part of Meriden Rural District, on 30 September 1895 the parish was abolished and merged with Fillongley.
