= St Chad's Church, Wishaw =

St Chad’s
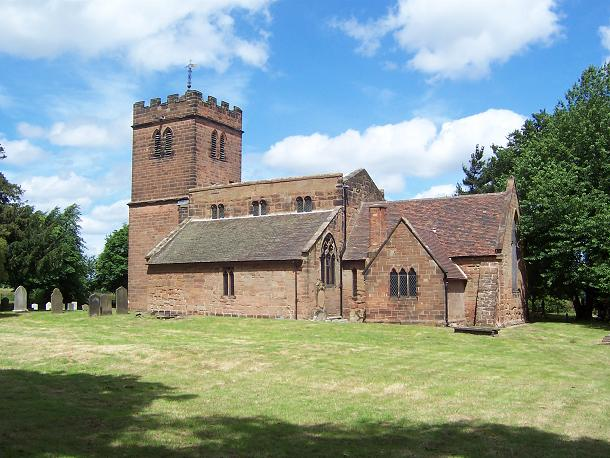
- St Chad’s
- 52°32′53.4″N 1°44′30.79″W
- OS grid reference: SP 17677 94570
- Location: Wishaw
- Country: England
- Denomination: Anglican

History
- Status: Parish church
- Founded: c.750
- Dedication: Chad of Mercia

Architecture
- Style: English Gothic
- Years built: c.1200-1600

Specifications
- Capacity: 150
- Materials: Sandstone

Administration
- Province: Province of Canterbury
- Diocese: Diocese of Birmingham
- Archdeaconry: Aston
- Deanery: Sutton Coldfield
- Parish: Curdworth, Middleton & Wishaw

Clergy
- Bishop: Bishop Michael Volland
- Vicar: Revd Joshva Raja

Listed Building – Grade II*
- Official name: Church of St Chad
- Designated: 8 September 1961
- Reference no.: 1034654

St Chad's Church, Wishaw is a Grade II* listed parish church in the Church of England in Wishaw, Warwickshire.

== History ==
The church dates from the 13th century. There was a major addition around 1700, and a substantial restoration in 1886 – 1887.

The pulpit was obtained from St Mark's Church Ladywood when it was demolished in 1947.

== Monuments ==
- Andrew Hacket, died 1709
- John Lisle Hacket, died 1673
- Mary Lisle, died 1676
- Thomas Lander, died 1809
- Howard Procter Ryland, died 1905
- John Hacker, died 1718
- Lady Hacker, died 1716
