= Maxstoke Priory =

Former Augustinian priory in Maxstoke, Warwickshire, England

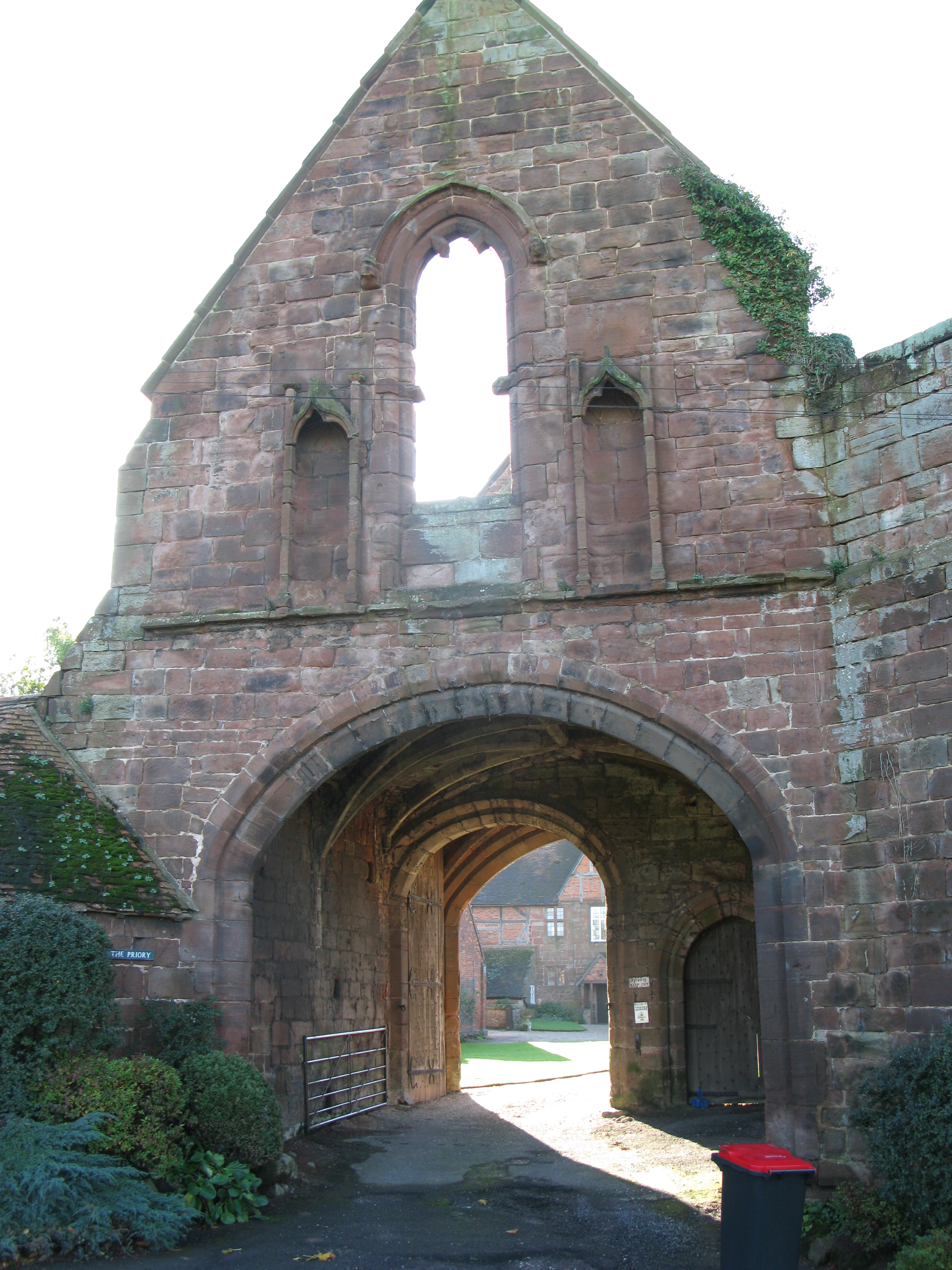
- The outer gatehouse
- Interactive map of Maxstoke Priory
- 52.47808°N 1.65624°W
- Location: Maxstoke, Warwickshire, England

Listed Building – Grade II*
- Official name: Priory Farmhouse
- Designated: 11 November 1952
- Reference no.: 1116105

Listed Building – Grade II*
- Official name: Outer gatehouse and attached precinct walls and barn 50 metres north of Priory Farmhouse
- Designated: 8 September 1961
- Reference no.: 1365129

Listed Building – Grade II*
- Official name: West wall of former infirmary, approximately 50 metres south of Priory Farmhouse
- Designated: 8 September 1961
- Reference no.: 1034822

Listed Building – Grade II*
- Official name: Remains of tower and walls of monastic church approximately 80 metres south of Priory Farmhouse, Church Road
- Designated: 8 September 1961
- Reference no.: 1320105

Listed Building – Grade II*
- Official name: Inner precinct wall approximately 30 metres west of Priory Farmhouse
- Designated: 8 September 1961
- Reference no.: 1034821

Listed Building – Grade II*
- Official name: Precinct wall, 60 metres north west of Old Rectory
- Designated: 8 September 1961
- Reference no.: 1116038

Scheduled monument
- Official name: Maxstoke Priory and moated site
- Designated: 9 October 1981
- Reference no.: 1011195

Maxstoke Priory was an Augustinian priory in Maxstoke, Warwickshire, England. The substantial remains are on Historic England's Heritage at Risk Register due to their poor condition.

== History of the Priory ==
In 1330 Sir William de Clinton, later Earl of Huntingdon, bought the advowson of Maxstoke parish church. It was his intention to found a large chantry or college of priests. A warden and five secular priests were appointed. In October 1331. £20 in land and rents together with the advowson of the church was used to found the chantry. In the following year a further five acres of land were added to the endowment. By 1336 Sir William had changed his intentions and decided to turn the college into a priory for Augustinian monks. The licence for this was obtained on 24 September 1336 but the actual charter of foundation is dated 10 March 1337. In 1336 Bishop Northburgh approved the appropriation of the churches of Long Itchington and Maxstoke to the fledgling priory. In 1340 Sir William was granted a licence to alienate in mortmain to the priory the advowson of Tanworth. This was granted to William by the priory at Kenilworth.

Building work proceeded slowly and it was not until 8 July 1342 that the buildings were sufficiently advanced to be consecrated. The priory was dedicated to the Holy Trinity, the Blessed Virgin, St. Michael and All Saints. In 1343 William de Clinton was successful in a petition to appropriate the nearby church of Shustoke to the fledgling priory. Also in this year the manor of Shustoke, together with the advowson of the church and chapel at Bentley, were obtained from Lord John Mowbray. These were soon exchanged, by Lord John de Clinton, for the ancient moated manor of Maxstoke together with its adjacent park. The manor house was converted to barns but the moat was maintained to turn a water mill. Two years later the nearby church of Fillongley followed suit. In 1344 Pope Clement VI confirmed the foundation. The following year saw a papal mandate sent to the Bishop of Lichfield for the appropriation to the priory of the church of Fillongley. It took a further papal confirmation in 1347 to secure the appropriation. Two years later, in 1349, Clement VI confirmed the appropriation of Yardley church. Further endowments followed including the church and advowson of Aston Cantlow (the prior and convent of Studley releasing all their rights). Aston Cantlow was to prove a troublesome and costly acquisition.

1360 saw the prior of Maxstoke commissioned by Bishop Stretton to enclose Brother Roger de Henorebarwe as an anchorite (hermit) at the chapel of Maryhall by Torworth in a building assigned for the purpose.

In 1399 an act of considerable violence took place with the priory. One of the canons was attacked by another and was forced to kill his assailant in self-defence. In February 1400 a complaint was sworn by Sir William Beauchamp that Friar John of Maxstoke and others had broken into his house at Aston Cantlow. They carried of goods to the value of 200 marks and £90 in cash. They also assaulted his men. This assault was in all likelihood a way of obtaining overdue rents.

Lord Clinton granted, in 1408, rents worth £10 annually from his lands in Dunton Bassett in Leicestershire. Fifty years later Humphrey, Duke of Buckingham, bequeathed £100 to the priory to purchase land to enable the support of a further canon. It was further stipulated that one of the canons should celebrate a daily mass for him, his family and ancestors at the altar in the north aisle of the priory church.

In the fifteenth century the Priory had a choir school attached to it. It also possessed an organ which was a very rare feature at this time. A set of account books from the priory dating from the fifteenth century have survived and are preserved in the Bodleian Library. Also surviving are a set of account rolls dating from the late fourteenth century. These are to be found in the Public Records Office. Together these records show that the Priory was a relatively small foundation of a middling value. They show that the precinct walls contained extensive fishponds, orchards of both apple and pear together with a garden which produced flax and hemp. The priory also maintained beef and dairy herds which were sold locally at Coleshill and other nearby markets. These documents reveal that the lands at Aston Cantlow, Fillongley, Long Itchington and Yardley formed an ecclesiastical manor with the prior at its head. They also reveal that during the time of Prior John Grene (1432–50) the large sum of £314 was spent on building. Also during Prior Grene’s tenure are a series of accounts which record payments to minstrels, jesters and players. They also show that the priory was embroiled in lengthy and expensive litigation with the priory of Studley regarding the church at Aston Cantlow. The money necessary to fight this legal battle came from loans and from the sale of some of the treasures of the priory. 1399 alone saw the sum of £205 raised from loans and the sale of jewels. The following year saw the sale of three books and a silver basin for £7. Four years later a cope was pledged to Lady Elizabeth Clinton for the large sum of £25 and jewels worth £17 were sold.

The Valor of 1535 saw the priory valued at an annual income of just over £130. After deductions for expenses such as distributions to the poor and other expenses the priory had a net worth of approximately £81. The following year the commissioners responsible for surveying all abbeys and priories for Thomas Cromwell reported that 'the Priorie of Maxstoke, Chanons of Seynt austyns order and rule' that its annual value was £112 9s. 4¾d. The religious were seven with the prior, of whom six were priests: 'ii suspect of incontynency and the others of good and vertuous conversation”. At this time the priory had twenty-seven further dependents including nine yeoman and three women servants. The buildings, lead and bells were given an estimated value of £352 while the stocks and moveable goods were valued at £115. There were recorded debts of £196. One of the commissioners, George Giffard, wrote to Cromwell on 3 August 1536 reporting the completion of the survey of the house. The Priory was dissolved soon after this date. The last prior, William Dicons, received a pension of 20 marks. Two years later, in 1538, the priory, and other church lands, was granted to Charles Brandon, Duke of Suffolk. He sold it soon after to a London goldsmith for the sum of £230.

== The Priory today ==
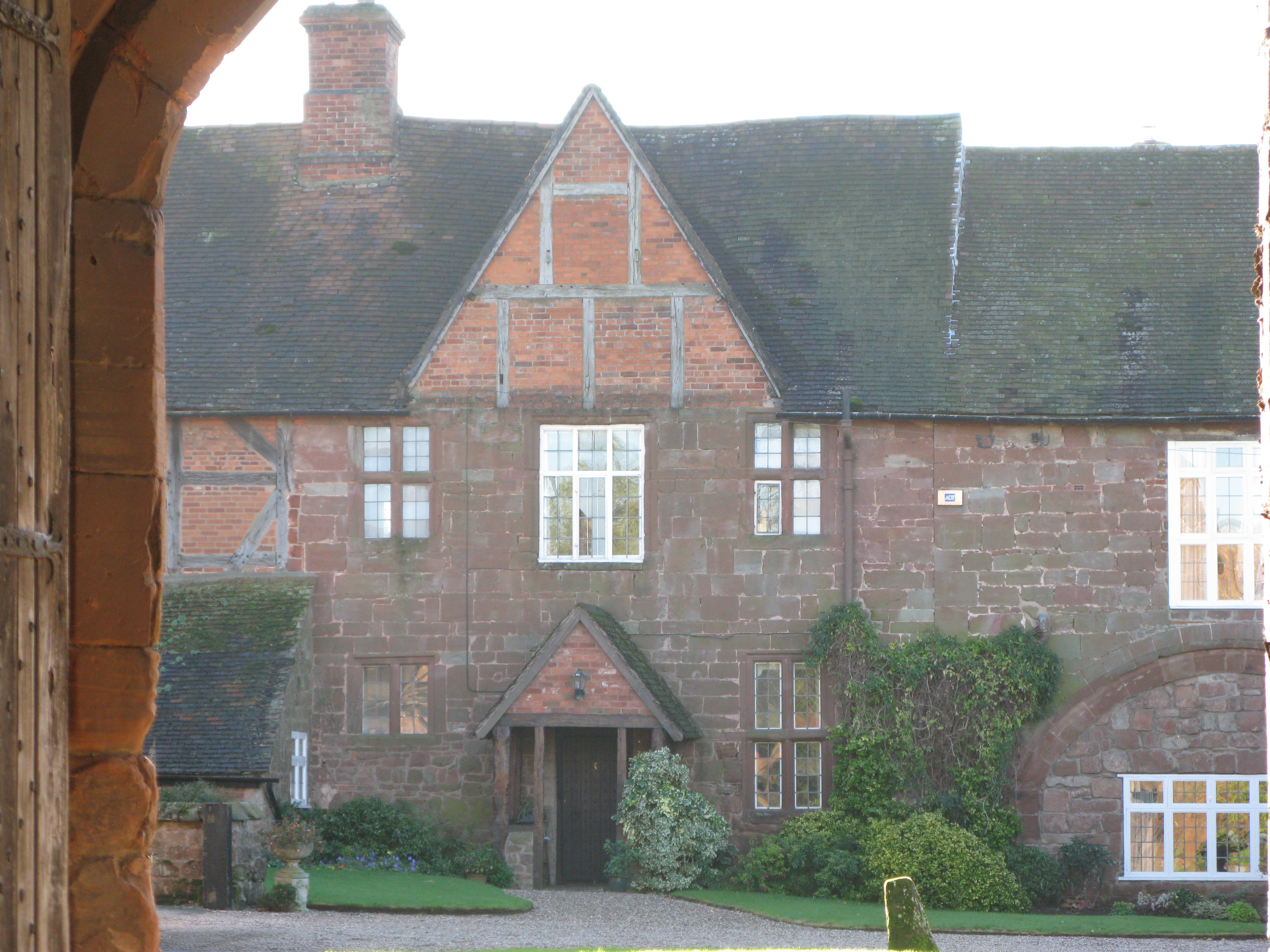
The Inner Gatehouse, now a farmhouse

Much of the priory has disappeared over the centuries since the Dissolution. An engraving made in 1729 by Nathaniel Buck show a nave, transepts and chancel converging on a central tower. Most of these have since collapsed or been demolished. Surviving ruins consist of the central tower and some remains of the walls of the priory church together with two gateways and the west wall of the infirmary.

The site was excavated during the 1870s and the full plan of the priory was revealed. The church had a cruciform plan with a nave and choir of equal lengths with transepts and a central tower. The cloisters lay to the south of the church and consisted of the usual monastic buildings of chapter house, dormitory and refectory.

In January 1986 much of the remains of the priory church collapsed. The arch of the south transept was destroyed although its eastern jamb remains. Much of the tower collapsed across the northern side of the nave hiding any remaining extant remains.

The Outer Gatehouse is of two storeys. The structure is now roofless but all of its walls are in a good structural condition. The north and south walls are gabled. The north and south arches of the gateway have two chamfered orders. The gateway also has an inner pair of south arches. The western is a pointed doorway while the eastern is a wader gateway. The north compartment has quadripartite vaulting which has chamfered ribs. The south compartment is also vaulted. In the west wall of the south compartment is a pointed doorway which once gave access to a west chamber. The upper floor of the gatehouse is lit by windows of two lights in the northern and southern walls. The northern window is flanked by two niches which once held statues. The window still retains its transom and drip moulds. On the end of the drip mouldings are two carved heads. One is of a knight with a closed visor while the other is of a monk. It is grade II* listed.

The Inner Gatehouse dates from the early fourteenth century but now has late sixteenth century alterations. The Prior’s Lodgings were originally located on the first floor of the gatehouse. By the Elizabethan period the gatehouse had been converted into a farmhouse. It is now a bed and breakfast one of whose rooms has painted armorial shields. As Priory Farmhouse it is also grade II* listed.

The Infirmary stood to the north-east of the priory church. The west wall still survives and dates from the early fourteenth century. It was originally of two storeys and is built of coursed and squared sandstone. The first floor retains a window of two lights which has fragments of reticulated tracery. There are two doorways at ground floor level. One is set in a two centred chamfered arch and the smaller door is set in an arch of three straight sides.

The Tower retains is north wall almost to its full height. The lower part of the east wall remains along with the chancel arch. Only the stumps of the south and west walls survive. The line of the gable of the chancel roof is visible on the east wall of the tower. The tower stood at the crossing of the priory church. It is an interesting piece of architecture. It is square at its lower levels but continues octagonally by high broaches. The northern and southern arches are rather narrow.

The Nave has been revealed by excavation to have been aisle less, but nothing can now be seen above ground. The cloisters lay to the north of the nave but, like the nave, nothing now survives above ground.

The Chancel does not survive above ground. Excavations revealed that like the nave it had no aisles. The eastern end was square. The jamb of a window survives on the eastern side of the north-eastern crossing pier.

The Inner Precinct Wall survives in part about 100m west of Priory Farmhouse (the former inner gate). It is built of irregularly coursed sandstone and contains the remains of doorways, archways and ogee arches. It may have formed part of the western cloistral range.

The Granary, with the pool for the watermill lies within the grounds of the Old Rectory. It is now covered with ferns and is said to be particularly attractive. The remains of the priories fish ponds are also located in the grounds of the Old Rectory.

The Precinct Wall is unusually well preserved and still survives for much of its length. At its extreme western end two arches still survive marking the place where the mill race left the mill. Also grade II* listed.

There is also one other possible piece of the priory surviving today. If it is from the priory it is a remarkable survival indeed and it is now owned by the local parish church. It is a chalice which is dated 1519. It may have been hidden at the time of the dissolution of the priory and was for many generations owned by the Haddon family who used it as a sugar bowl. It eventually came into the possession of Eric Gold who gave it to the church. It was rededicated to its sacred function in 1961.

It is also possible that the local parish church of St. Michael may have also served as the cappella ante portas (chapel outside the gates) of the priory.

The priory ruins are private property. The ruins of the outer gatehouse stand beside the road and can be viewed from there. The remainder is inaccessible to the general public apart from those staying at the farmhouse in the inner gatehouse. A tantalising glimpse of the remains of the tower can also be seen from the road. Please respect the privacy of the owners.

== Incomplete List of Priors ==
- John Deyville c. 1336
- Robert Walford 1341?- 1346
- ?
- Reginald de Birmingham 1370?-1383
- ?
- John Birmingham 1389-1401
- John Daventry 1401-1411
- ?
- John Nasington 1424-1432
- John Grene 1432-1450
- Richard Evesham 1451-1459
- ?
- John Freeman 1472-1493
- ?
- William Dyson (Dicons) 1505-1538
