= Church of St Nicholas and St Peter ad Vincula, Curdworth =

Church in Warwickshire, England

SS Nicholas and Peter Ad Vincula, Curdworth
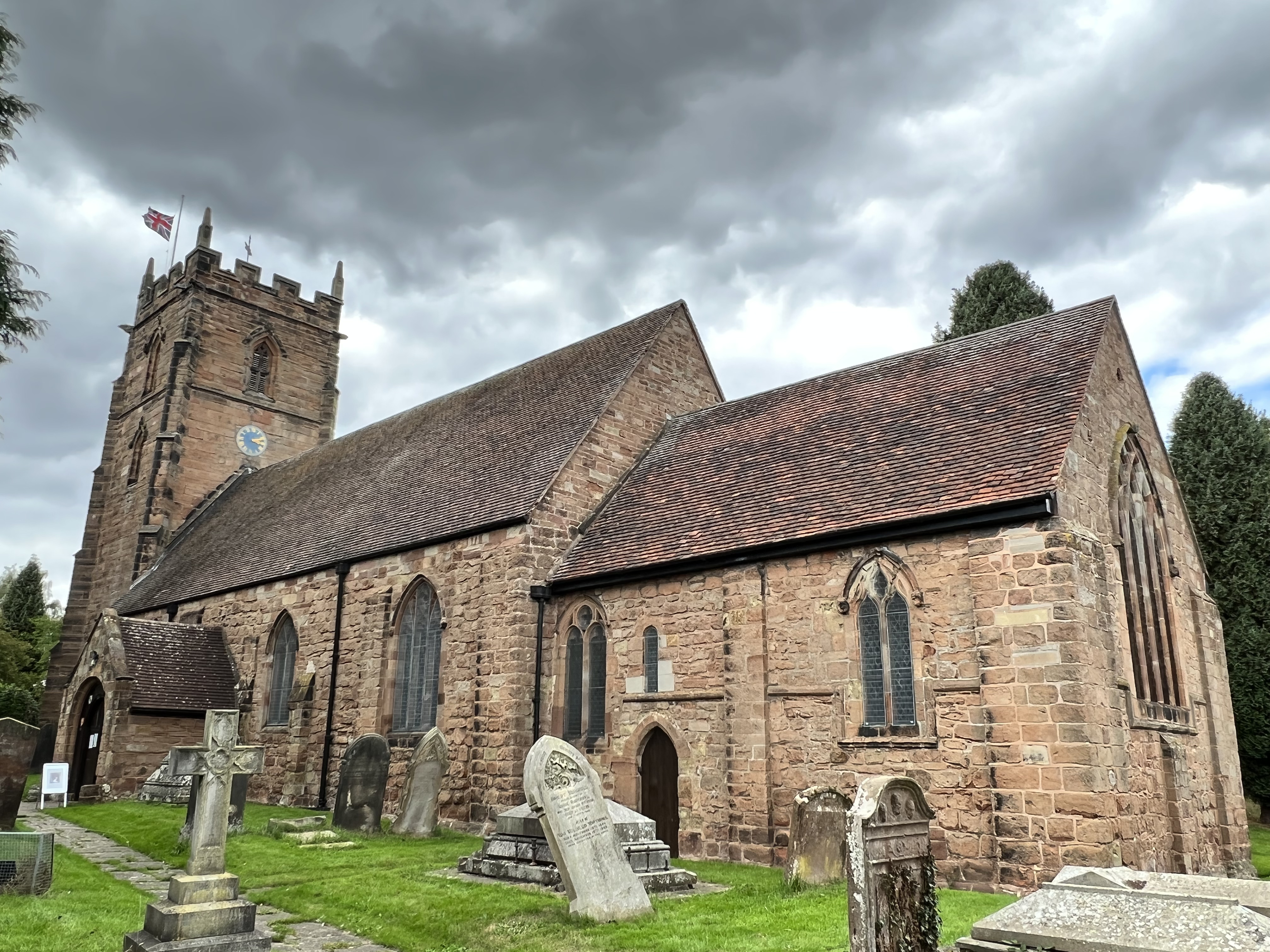
- SS Nicholas and Peter Ad Vincula, Curdworth

- Location within Warwickshire
- 52.5328°N 1.7394°W
- OS grid reference: SP 17792 92811
- Location: Curdworth
- Country: England
- Denomination: Church of England

History
- Dedication: St Nicholas and St Peter ad Vincula
- Dedicated: 2007
- Consecrated: 1450

Administration
- Province: Canterbury
- Diocese: Birmingham
- Archdeaconry: Aston
- Deanery: Sutton Coldfield
- Parish: Curdworth, Middleton and Wishaw

Listed Building – Grade II*
- Official name: Church of St Nicholas and St Peter
- Designated: 8 September 1961
- Reference no.: 1185754

St Nicholas and St Peter ad Vincula Church is located in Curdworth, Warwickshire, England. It is dedicated to St Nicholas and St Peter ad Vincula.

== History and architecture ==
The present Church of St Nicholas and St Peter ad Vincula is of Norman origin (1170–1190), established in 1165 when the Augustinian Canons of the Abbey of St Mary de Pratis, Leicester were granted the right to present a priest to the parish. The church was lengthened in the 14th century and the Perpendicular style tower was added in 1460 by the Earl of Warwick, but it was never finished with its intended spire.

The church underwent some restoration from 1895 to 1896 when repairs were undertaken to the roof which was in a state of dilapidation and the tower was unsafe at the top. At the same time the organ was rebuilt and new choir stalls were given by the Vicar of Milverton, Rev. M.M. Pope.

In 1895 a carved stone Saxon font was recovered during refurbishments to the church by Lord Norton. The font had been buried under the nave floor, possibly during the Reformation and indicates that a church has been present on the site since Saxon times. This font has been in use ever since its rediscovery.

== Stained glass ==
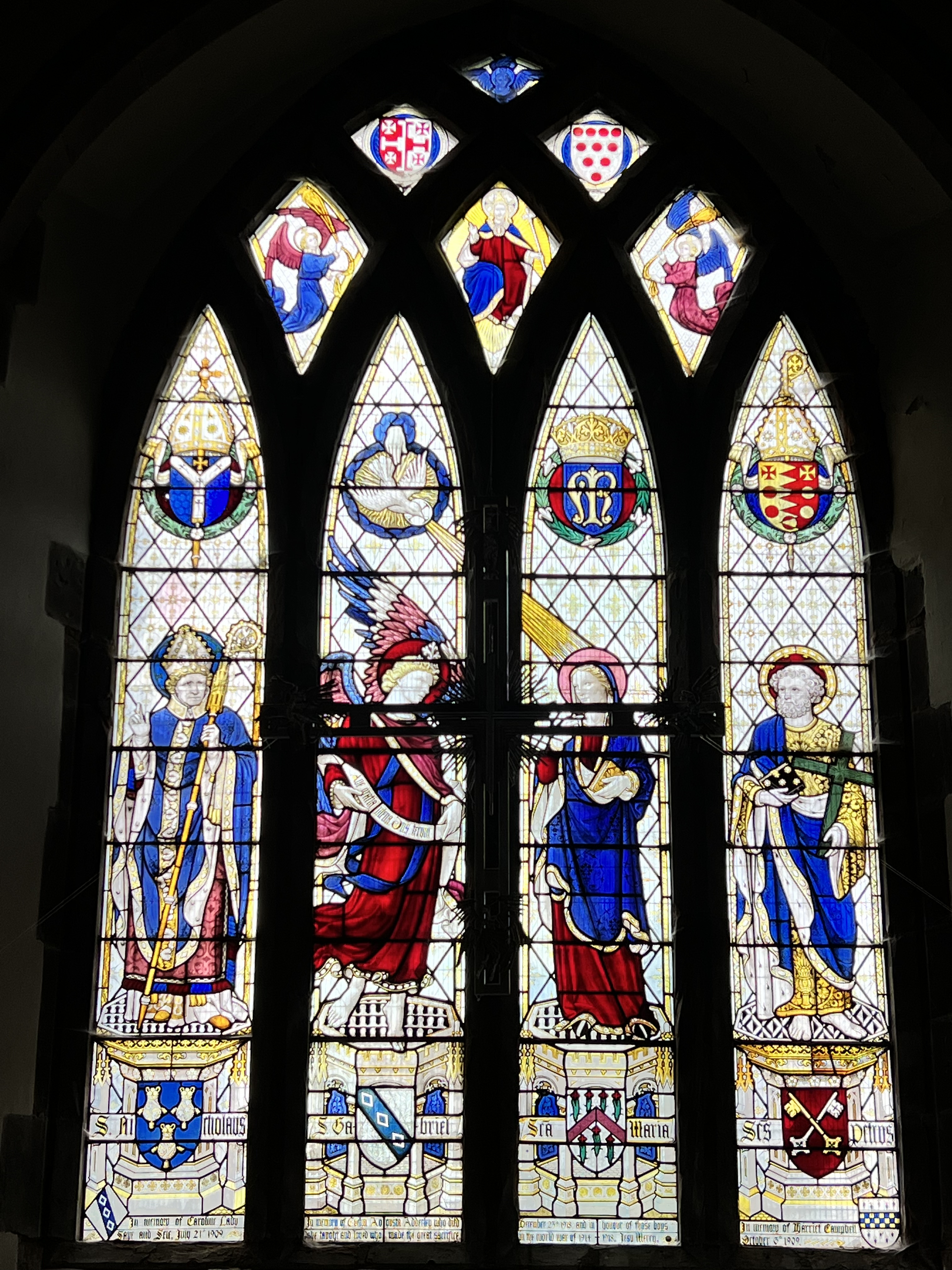
Stained glass window in memory of Lord Norton

A new stained glass window was installed in 1912 by the Hon. Miss Adderley, daughter of the late Lord Norton. The upper portion shows the arms of Lichfield and Worcester, beneath is a figure of Christ between two angels with censers. The large lights show St Nicholas, first patron of the church surmounted by the arms of the Province of Canterbury, and the second St Peter, surmounted by the arms of Birmingham. The artist was Geoffrey Webb.

== Churchyard ==
It is believed some soldiers killed in the English Civil War Battle of Curdworth Bridge are buried in the churchyard, which also contains the war graves of six Commonwealth service personnel of World War I (mostly Royal Flying Corps officers) and three of World War II.

== Bells ==
There are three bells in the tower; the first tenor, The Mary Bell dating from the 15th century, said to have been given in gratitude by a traveller lost in the Forest of Arden, guided to safety to Curdworth by the sound of a bell. The second bell is dated 1756 and inscribed "Thos. Eayre de Kettering" and the third treble bell is inscribed "Edward Astley 1663. Thomas Wilcox". The bells were restored in 1905 by Lord Norton.

== Organ ==
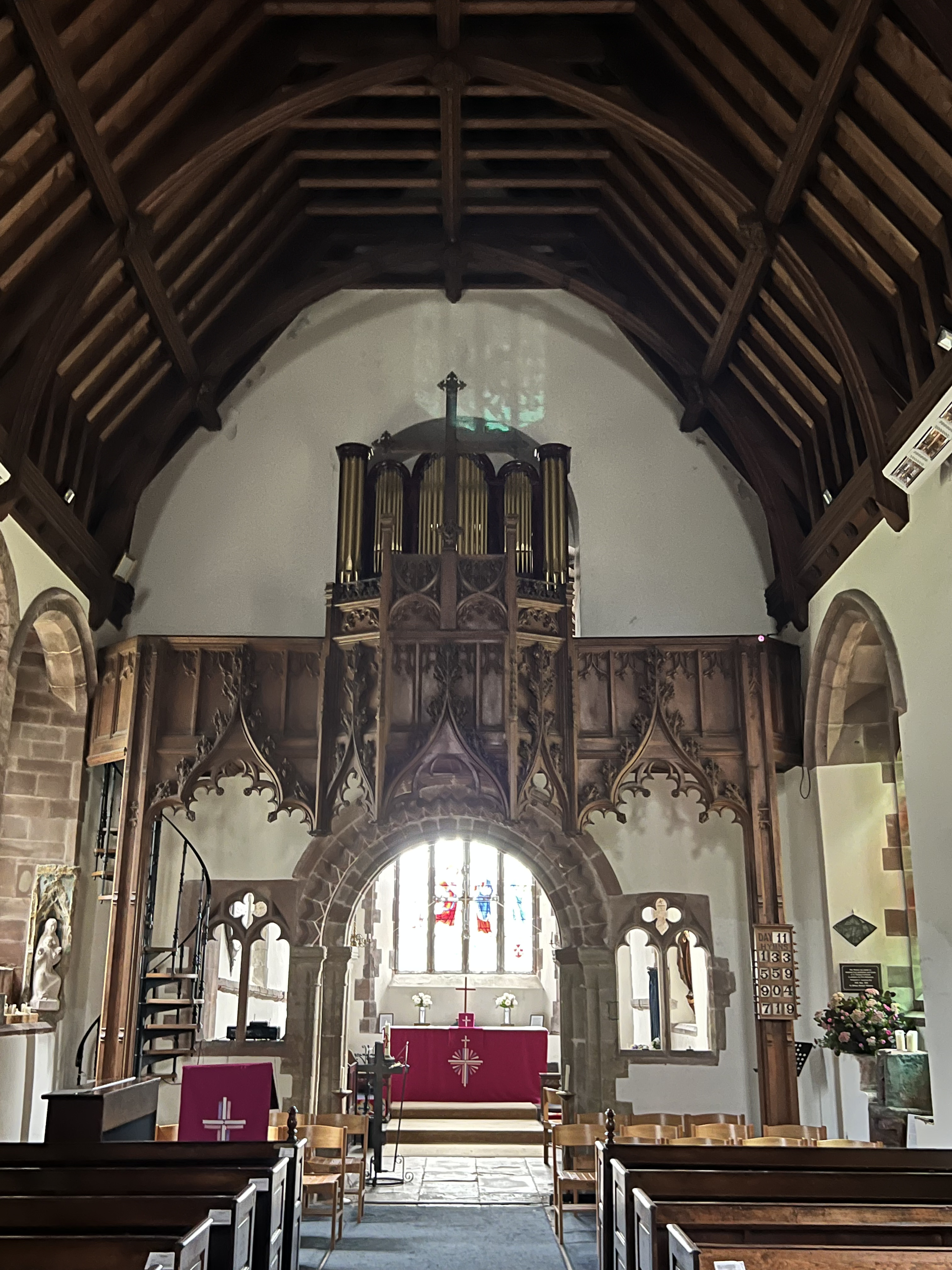
The organ with its case dating from ca. 1830, sits on the rood screen

The church has a two-manual pipe organ. The organ was rebuilt by Bamfield and Son of Birmingham in 1896. A specification of the organ can be found on the National Pipe Organ Register.

== Sculpture ==
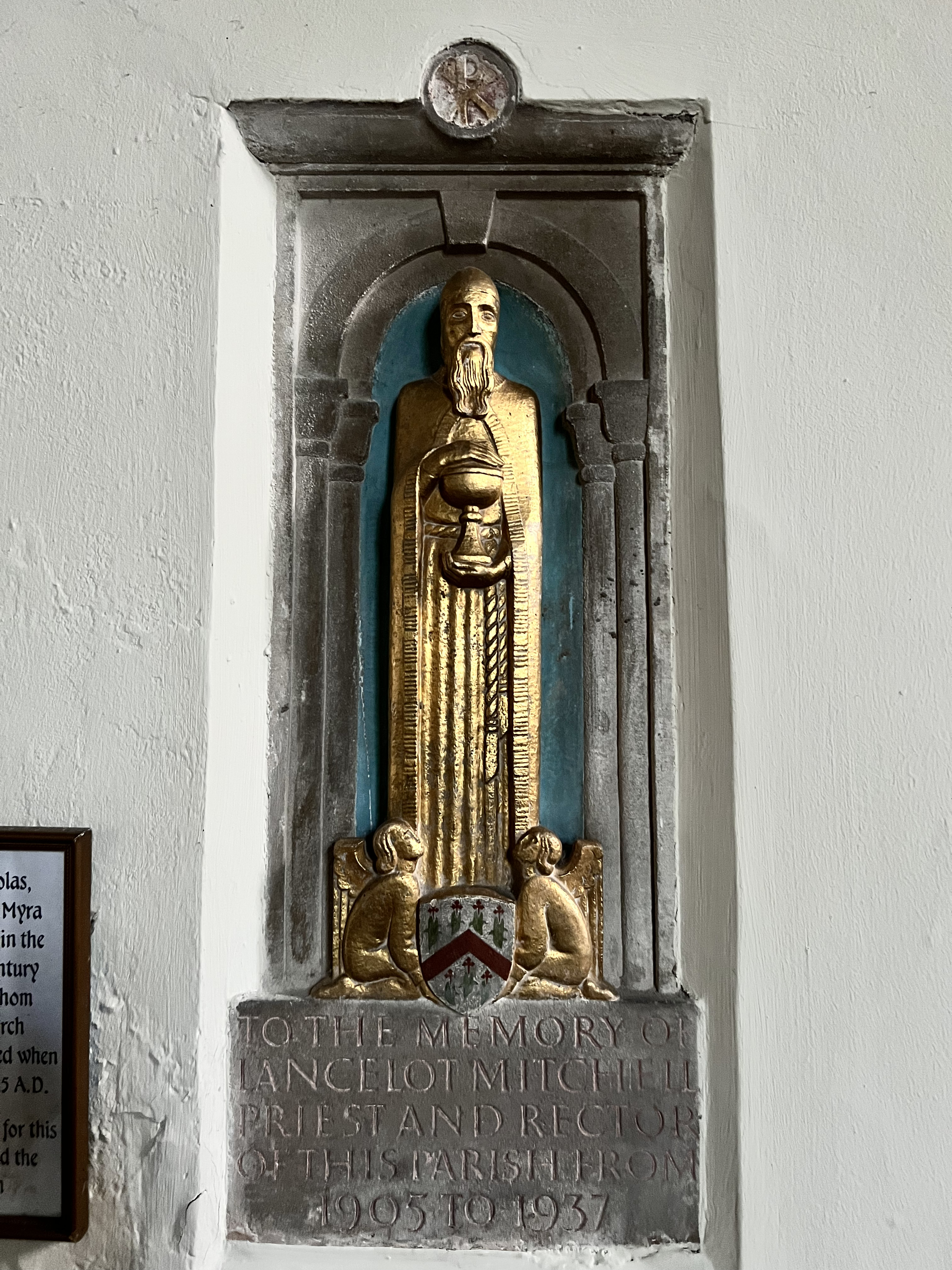
Memorial to Lancelot Mitchell

Amongst many pieces of sculpture is an angel (now headless) that used to be on the road bridge over the River Tame at Water Orton to safeguard the safe passage of travellers.

Inside the church is a memorial to Lancelot Mitchell Priest and Rector 1905 - 1937. The statue is of Melchizedek, representing priesthood. It was designed by Holland W. Hobbiss, sculpted by William Bloye, and installed in 1950.
