= Henry de Ardern =

14th-century English politician

Henry de Ardern, or Henry Ardern, was a Member of Parliament for Warwickshire in 1377 and again in 1380, and for Worcestershire from November 1381.

In 1373 Henry bought Park Hall, near Castle Bromwich, from Sir John Botetourt. In 1377, or 1378, he was granted the manors of Croome Adam (now Earls Croome) and Grafton Flyford by the Earl of Warwick for a red rose.

He was the son of Ralph de Ardern and probably born at Curdworth. He died in 1382.

He married and had a son, Ralph Ardern who also became the Member of Parliament for Worcestershire in March 1406.
