= Botts Green =

Hamlet in Warwickshire, England

Coordinates: 52.529°N 1.642°W

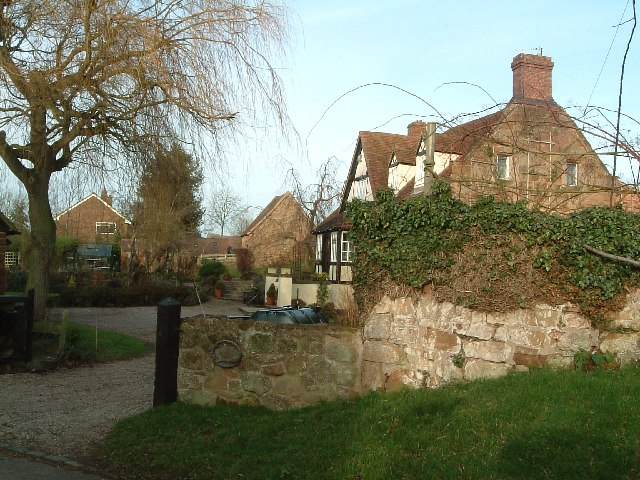
Botts Green village

Botts Green is a hamlet and green in the North Warwickshire district of the county of Warwickshire in England. It is located close to Whitacre Heath, Coleshill and Kingsbury. Population details can be found under Nether Whitacre. Botts Green Hall is a Grade II* listed jettied half-timbered building dating from 1593.
