= Wishaw, Warwickshire =

Village and civil parish in Warwickshire, England

Coordinates: 52.549°N 1.741°W

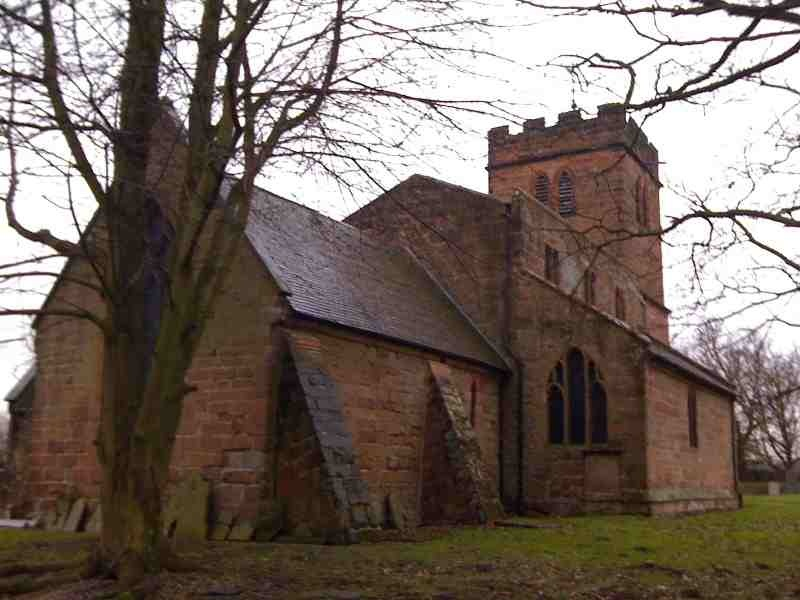
St. Chad's Church, located on The Gravel.

Wishaw is a village and civil parish in the north-west of Warwickshire, England. The population of the civil parish at the 2021 census was 132. It is located within the district of North Warwickshire and is the home of The Belfry golf resort, which has hosted the Ryder Cup on four occasions. The village is also home to some notable buildings. The site of The Belfry was once the location of Moxhull Park, a stately home that belonged to the Ryland family (previously the Halket family) until it burnt down in the early twentieth century. The manor house was rebuilt one mile away to its present location on Holly Lane as Moxhull Hall. Wishaw is also the location of a church dedicated to the local Saint Chad. The church is popular with marriages and regular Sunday services, despite a very small local population.

Wishaw is also the home of Wishaw Country Sports, a diverse venue that offers a variety of activities such as shooting, blindfold driving and tractor driving. It also features a converted farm building which is now used as a luxury event venue, offering birthdays, weddings and other functions upon request. Wishaw is located about one mile north of the village of Curdworth and about three miles east of the town of Sutton Coldfield, in the West Midlands. In 2003, residents claimed that a mobile phone mast at the centre of the village was the cause of a local cancer cluster. The mast was felled by unknown vandals in November 2003 and subsequent pressure against plans to replace it led operator T-Mobile to abandon the site.
