= Castle Bromwich =

Village in the West Midlands, England

- Civil parish and neighbourhood
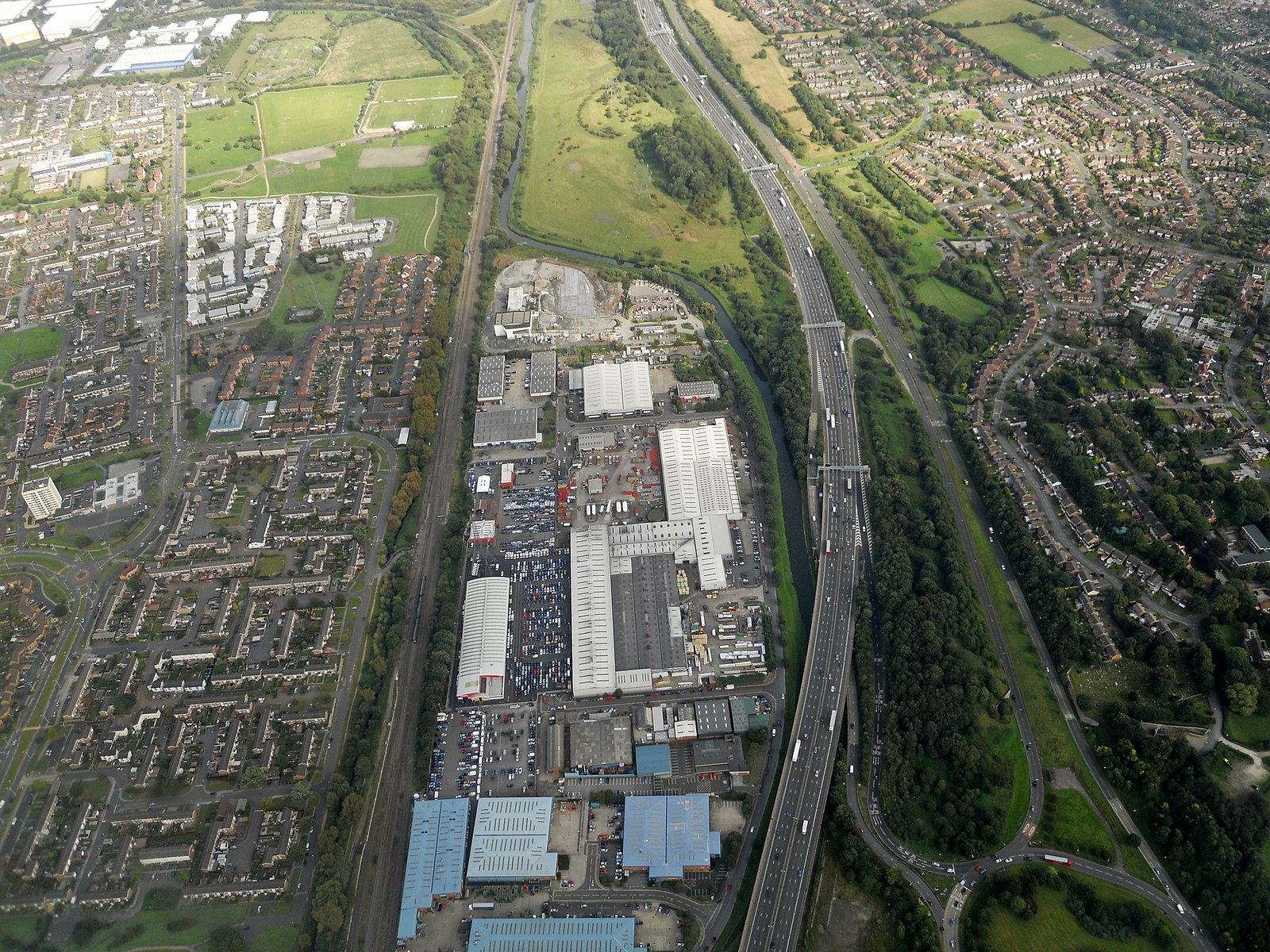
- Aerial photo, 2012

- Location within the West Midlands county Location within England
- Coordinates: 52.5050°N 1.7856°W
- Sovereign state: United Kingdom
- Country: England
- Region: West Midlands
- Ceremonial county: West Midlands
- Historic county: Warwickshire
- Parliamentary constituency: Birmingham Hodge Hill and Solihull North

Government
  - Type: Borough
  - Body: Metropolitan Borough of Solihull

Population
  - Total: 11,217
- (2011)
- Time zone: UTC+0 (Greenwich Mean Time)
  - Summer (DST): UTC+1 (British Summer Time)
- Postal code: B36
- Dialling code: 0121
- Post town: BIRMINGHAM
- Police: West Midlands
- Ambulance: West Midlands
- Fire: West Midlands
- OS grid reference: SP145897

Castle Bromwich (/brɒmɪtʃ/; colloquially abbreviated to Castle Brom) is a large suburban village and civil parish in the Metropolitan Borough of Solihull in the West Midlands, England. It borders the rest of the borough to the south east, Sutton Coldfield to the east and north east. It borders Birmingham: Shard End to the south west, Castle Vale, Erdington and Minworth to the north and Hodge Hill to the west.

Historically part of the Meriden Rural District of Warwickshire, in the 1920s half of the original parish was ceded to the City of Birmingham for the construction of overspill estates. In 1974 it became part of the new metropolitan county.

== History ==
Castle Bromwich was originally a Warwickshire village. There has been a settlement here since before Stone Age times. There is evidence that the area was first settled some 5,000 years ago. Romans, Saxons and Normans also settled on this raised piece of land close to a natural ford across the River Tame. The Chester Road runs through the village following the line of a drovers' road called the Welsh Road, the origins of which are probably an ancient trackway from the pre-Roman era. Bromwich is not named in Domesday Book in 1086 yet was in the ancient hundred of Coleshill. Bromwich comes from the old words 'brom' for the yellow flowering broom, which grows here, and 'wich' an ancient name for a dwelling or settlement. The motte (called the Pimple Hill locally) is some 40 metres in diameter and appears to be a natural feature that was probably heightened by Iron Age settlers, then by the later Normans and once again during the development of the 1970s to make way for the A452 "Collector Road", which bypassed Castle Bromwich to the north.

The Pimple commanded the important crossing place of the River Tame. It remains today, somewhat reduced, sandwiched between the M6 and the Collector Road (Castle Bromwich & Chelmsley Wood bypass). There was an extensive archaeological dig of the area prior to the development of the Pimple site and discoveries were made that confirmed folk tales of the area. The Pimple was the highest point of an Iron-Age fortification that encompassed most of Castle Bromwich. The land between the Pimple and Kyters Lane was particularly well defended by several areas of ridge and furrow; Kyters Lane and Rectory Lane were built within ditches. Other ditches were excavated between Kyters Lane and the Pimple but nothing of consequence was found. The name Pimple was commonly used from about 1915 onwards, and the story that the hill was a Saxon burial ground appeared around 1935, when the spread of dwellings from Washwood Heath began to appear over Hodge Hill. Modern houses now occupy the site and overlook the graveyard. The ridge and furrow has been obliterated.

There is a good view over Castle Vale (formerly Castle Bromwich Aerodrome) and the Tame valley from the top of the hill.

During the 18th century Castle Bromwich was an important place at the junction of two turnpikes. Chester Road, an old Roman way from London to Chester, joined the Birmingham to Coleshill road near Castle Bromwich Hall. There was a toll gate at the junction of Chester Road, School Lane and Old Croft Lane, near the village green. The toll house still exists, although the massive 14-foot (4.3 m) wide toll gate has been lost. In the 1780s stagecoaches travelling from Holyhead to London stopped in the village, as did a horse-drawn bus from Birmingham to Coleshill. There were several coaching inns and two survive today. The Midland Railway arrived in 1842 and Castle Bromwich Station was rebuilt in 1901. Boy Scouts used to arrive here and trek the four miles (6 km) to their major camp at Yorkswood in Kingshurst. The station closed in 1965 and was partly demolished in 1975.

Until 1894 the village was a hamlet in the large parish of Aston. Castle Bromwich has had historic ties with both Erdington and Water Orton through administration, governance and land ownership whilst being part of the parish. The Local Government Act 1894 created a parish of Castle Bromwich from part of the Aston parish not in either Birmingham or Aston Manor urban district. It was part of the Castle Bromwich Rural District from 1894 until 1912, when it became part of the Meriden Rural District.

During the 18th and especially during the 19th centuries wealthy Birmingham businessmen built large houses in Castle Bromwich.

Castle Bromwich has a village green. The land for this, called Seven Acre Green, was given to the village by Viscount Newport in 1895. The War Memorial was erected in 1920 on a small island nearby. There is also another green called Whateley Green. Whateley is derived from the Anglo-Saxon for wheatfield clearing. This was the site of the village's stray animal pounds and a smithy. It had two pounds, stocks and a whipping post. Whateley Hall was nearby. The ancient duck pond was filled in during the late 1950s.

In 1931, a portion of Castle Bromwich land was sold and ceded to the City of Birmingham which built the overspill Chipperfield Road development during 1937–8. This halved the area of the parish of Castle Bromwich, from 2,742 acres (11.10 km^{2}) to 1,239 acres (5.01 km^{2}).

During World War II, the occupants of Chipperfield Road pulled down an ancient white-washed farm house thinking it would deny German bomber crews a marker to the aerodrome and the adjoining factories. The Firs Estate (as it was then known, and including Chipperfield Road, Oakdale Road, Millington Road and Ermington Crescent) were private semi-detached houses that briefly enjoyed the benefit of the farmland and golf links. In the late 1950s further development took place. The new council housing was built adjacent to Chipperfield Road and as far as the Newport Road. The name "Firs Estate" now points to the council estate and the name originated from the fir trees that stood near a large house between Chipperfield Road and Hodge Hill Common.

The council housing was also extended up what was known locally as "The Golf Links" to meet the Stables, now known as the Comet.

Castle Bromwich Golf Club (now defunct) was founded in the 1890s. The club and course closed at the onset of World War II.

== Governance ==
Castle Bromwich was a civil parish within the Meriden Rural District of Warwickshire. In the 1920s, half of the original parish was ceded to the expanding City of Birmingham county borough. Under the Local Government Act 1972, in 1974 the parish became part of the Metropolitan Borough of Solihull in the newly created West Midlands metropolitan county. The parish was subsequently split into two.

== Demographics ==
Castle Bromwich had a population of 11,857 according to the 2001 census, falling to 11,217 at the 2011 census. The population has remained quite stable since then; the 2017 population estimate was 12,309.

In 1861, the population was 613. This rose to just over 1,000 in the 1920s, when half of the original parish was ceded to the City of Birmingham for the construction of overspill estates. This caused a drop to 678 (almost the 1861 level). Post Second World War estate building in Castle Bromwich increased the population to 4,356 in 1951, 9,205 in 1961 and 15,941 in 1971.

== Churches ==
There are two from the Church of England, and a Methodist and a Baptist nearby. St Mary and St Margaret's Parish Church is the original church and is in the west of the village. It is unusual as it is a "church within a church". A small stone chapel was known on the site before 1165. It was replaced in the 15th century by a large half-timbered structure. The church was extensively altered between 1726 and 1731 by Sir John Bridgeman and the old timber one was encased in brick and plaster. The massive oak timbers can be seen now in the roof. It is considered to have outstanding architectural and historic merit.

St Clement's Church is in the east and was built in 1967, when the original parish was split into two.

== Castle Bromwich Hall ==
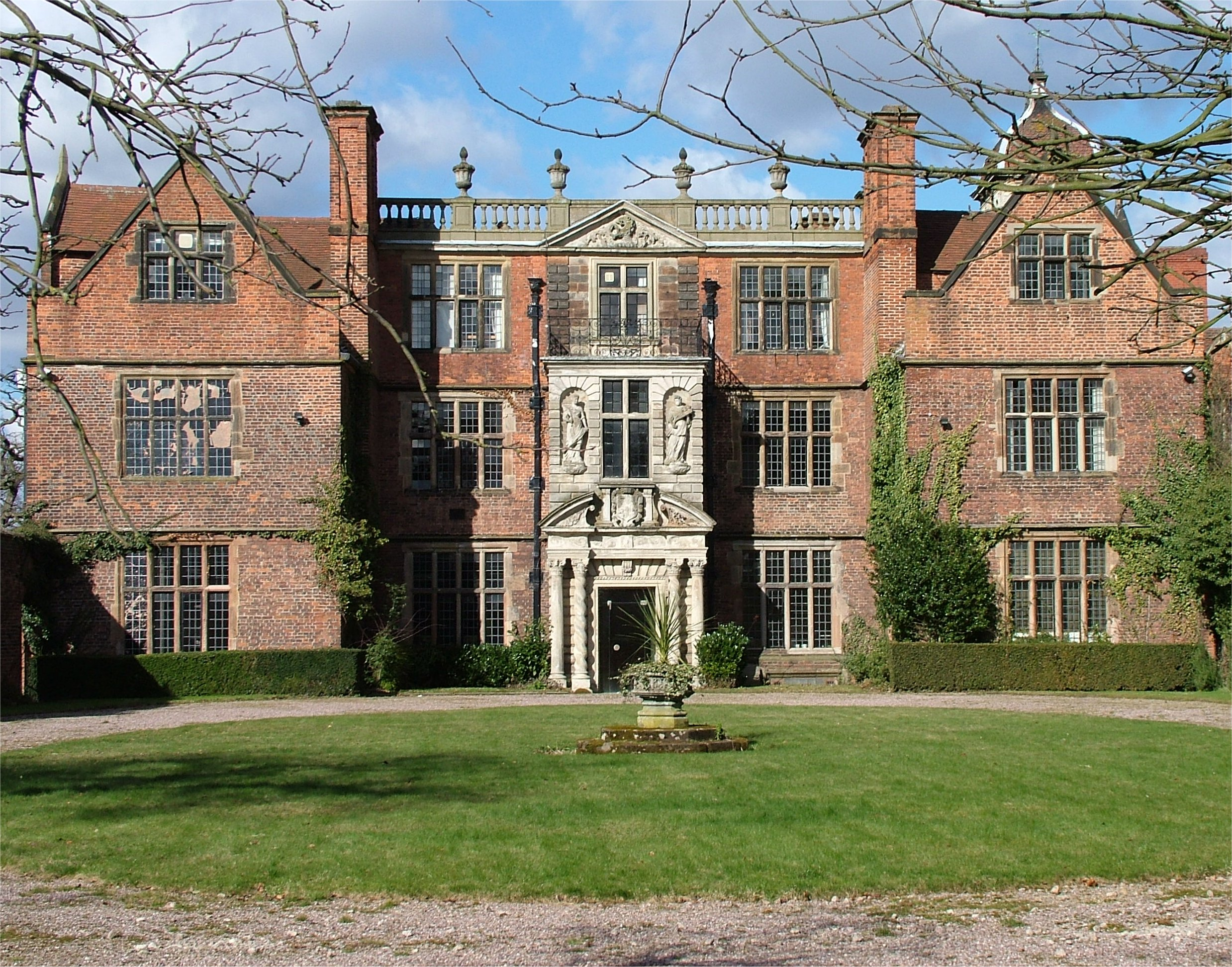
Castle Bromwich Hall

Castle Bromwich Hall is a Jacobean mansion that was built in 1599 by Sir Edward Devereux, the first MP for Tamworth in Staffordshire. It was a single storey with a plain entrance. It was bought by Sir Orlando Bridgeman (keeper of The Great Seal) in 1657, for his son Sir John Bridgeman I. Sir John extended and improved the property in 1672, adding the second floor and a large front porch. His son, Sir John Bridgeman II, inherited it in 1710. He extended the Hall and rebuilt it in local hand-made bricks of clay. The Bridgmans were created Barons of Bradford in 1792, and Earls of Bradford in 1851. A marriage also brought Weston Park into their possession, which the family gave to the National Trust in 1986. The Hall was then rented out or used for other family members to live in. It is famous for having twelve windows (one for each Apostle) and four dormers above (one for each Of the four Gospels).

The garden door passed through a grapevine which was always trimmed into the form of a cross. The last family member, Lady Ida Bridgeman, Dowager Countess Bradford left the Hall in 1936. It then was used for storage during World War II. Post-war it was leased out as an apprentice training centre for the GEC, and then used as offices while the outbuildings are used by other small companies. The conservation area is centred on the Hall. The Hall is falsely reported as having tunnels linking to the former vicarage and former public house nearby.

=== Castle Bromwich Hall Gardens ===
Castle Bromwich Hall Gardens which surround the Hall is the only surviving example of an 18th-century English formal garden, having escaped the attentions of Capability Brown. Sir John Bridgeman II originally laid out the Hall's gardens in the style to which they have now been restored by the Castle Bromwich Hall Gardens Trust. They commenced the restoration of the 10 acres (4.0 ha) in 1985. The Gardens are open to the public and are a tourist attraction.

The Rectory was commissioned by the 5th Earl of Bradford, who enjoyed having tea at the Rectory. The Rectory is now grade II Listed.

== Other places of interest ==
Many of the old buildings have now been demolished and farms have disappeared to make way for new housing and roads.

Park Hall was bought by Henry de Ardern in 1373. The 'Park Hall Manor House' was supposedly haunted and was demolished in the early 1970s during construction of the M6 motorway. The hall was first mentioned in 1265, but this could have been a nearby moated timbered dwelling. Remnants of the hall, farm house and adjacent buildings, orchard and pond are still visible at the Park Hall Wildlife Reserve managed by the Birmingham & Black Country Wildlife Trust. The name lives on in Park Hall School, which is on the other side of the road, and is the largest secondary school in the Metropolitan Borough of Solihull.

Castle Bromwich Post Office was the first to have a telephone outside London so that Benjamin Disraeli could keep in touch with the government. He frequently visited Castle Bromwich Hall in the 1870s, possibly to court Lady Chesterfield and Lady Bradford. Later, Queen Mary made use of the telephone when visiting Lady Ida (Lady of the Queen's Bed Chamber) at the Hall. The Post Office closed in 2004 and is now a hairdressing salon.

A drawing of 1726 shows a large structure called "Old Castle Hall" next to the old castle earthworks.

Chester Road used to climb up a steep hill from the river to the church, called "Mill Hill". Towards the bottom of the hill was a brick structure surrounding the Holy Well of St Lawrence. This has now been covered by the roundabout for junction 5 of the M6.

Castle Bromwich Mill stood on the southern bank of the River Tame, close to the bottom of Mill Hill. It was still grinding corn in 1895 and possibly later. It then became an artist's studio until it was demolished in 1956. The M6 now covers the site, which is near to the Firs estate. There were several other mills in the area, some also drawing water from the Tame.

Two of the old coaching inns still exist. The Bradford Arms was built in 1723 on the site of an earlier pub called "The White Lion". The high doors to the coach houses can still be seen. Law courts and Catholic services have been held here. It is the oldest pub in the village. The Coach and Horses dated from the 18th century and stood in the front drive of the present public house. This was built in the 1920s and re-roofed in 1938 when the thatched roof caught fire. Additionally, The Castle dates to the early 18th century and was the village alehouse. Later it became a general stores and then a private residence. The 17th century Georgian style Bridgeman Arms Inn is now also a private residence.

Adjacent to the Bridgeman Arms Inn were several cottages, used for servants, and an estate office for the Earl of Bradford who then owned much of the land in Castle Bromwich. The first Police Station was also established here under Pc Charlie Whale, before moving to a specialist house and lock up near to the Coach and Horses. When the Kingshurst estate was built policing was from a two-man unit there, this closed down when the new Chelmsley Wood station opened. Part of the Inn was destroyed by a bomb in World War II, when two platoons of the Home Guard were based there. A 17th-century well was found in the courtyard of the cottages. The cottages and office have now been replaced by a service road and new houses.

St Mary and St Margaret's Church of England Primary School was built in the 19th century and demolished in 1968 when the move was complete to larger premises with playing fields. Private housing now covers the site.

Harvey's Drapery Shop was a single storey extension to the main house. Originally it was a druggist's (the only one between Birmingham and Coleshill). The visiting doctor from Coleshill arrived on horseback to take his surgery in a room in the house. Later it became a two-storey extension to the house and the extended house was the home of the village electrician. It is now a private residence.

Green Lane was the oldest trackway through the village. One of the ancient Ridgeways of England, it ran from the castle to Grimstock Hill Romano-British settlement at Coleshill. It is now mostly underneath Chelmsley Wood and the M6.

The following houses have all disappeared; some are remembered on road signs:

- Camden House – dated to the 17th century and was a gardeners' cottage for the Hall.
- The Cedars – was built in 1897 by Alderman Thomas Clayton JP. It was a large country residence with its own generating plant.
- Eldon House – dated from the middle of the 18th century and used as a farm and the rectory.
- The Elms
- The Firs – was a large house near Castle Bromwich Hall. It was usually occupied by the estate bailiff to the Hall. The site is now a post World War II housing estate of the same name.
- The Gables – dating from 1800, but it was a mock half timbered 16th-century manor house.
- The Granary – dated to the early 18th century was the village malt house. It is now a private residence. The upstairs room was once used for Church meetings and the adjoining building was an early bowling alley. This adjoining building has been demolished and a private house erected upon the site.
- Hawkesford
- The Hawthorns
- The Hollies
- Rainbow Cottages – a group of cottages opposite the Post Office.
- The Southfields – dated to the middle of the 19th century. In 1908, it was occupied by Edward Randall who owned the first motor car in the village. During the Second World War, it became a secret plastics factory. The house is now part of the Remembrance Club.
- The Sycamores – later known as Poplar Farm
- Timberley House – was built in the late 18th century as a farmhouse. It was demolished in the 1930s and a cinema was built on the site. Before fitting out it was used a store in the Second World War. This was demolished in 1962 and a small supermarket now exists there.
- Westeria
- Whateley Hall – probably built in the 18th century in classical style, but there is evidence of a moated structure from the 14th century. The Hall was surrounded by considerable wooded grounds and was the second largest house in the village, after Castle Bromwich Hall. The Knight family was in residence from the 1860s until 1935 when it was sold and demolished. The Hall was owned by the William Newton II before this, and his sons Canon Horace Newton and Goodwin Newton, before they moved to Barrells Hall.

and farms such as:

- Beechcroft – now a housing estate.
- The Firs – now a housing estate within the City of Birmingham.
- Green Lanes – now part of a Chelmsley Wood housing area.
- Hob
- Park Hall – remains still visible on the Park Hall Wildlife Reserve
- Poplar – now a small housing estate.
- Rawlins – only the farm house remains as a modernised "half timbered" private residence, the rest is a housing estate.

== Castle Bromwich Aerodrome ==
A large piece of Warwickshire grassland (Castle Bromwich Playing Fields) became the Castle Bromwich private aerodrome, when Alfred P. Maxwell flew the first aeroplane in the Birmingham area in September 1909. It became a stopping place during early air races. The War Office requisitioned it for use by the Royal Flying Corps and flying schools in 1914, when proper roads and buildings were established. The British Industries Fair (the pre runner to the National Exhibition Centre) was a large complex of buildings built on land adjacent to the aerodrome and Castle Bromwich railway station in 1920. In the inter war years the aerodrome had a military and civilian function. In these early days it was the busiest airport in the area due to its combined passenger, post and railway air business. During the late 1920s and early 1930s the aerodrome was also a checking-in point for the infamous 'Contact Races' held in the Midlands, which were organised by and between various civil flying clubs in the area.

In 1934, the Air Ministry stated that Castle Bromwich could not be used for civil purposes indefinitely, so a new airport was constructed at Elmdon (some five miles (8 km) away), just outside the Birmingham City boundary. It opened in 1939 and is now Birmingham Airport. In 1937, more hangars and a Squadron Headquarters were built for the Royal Air Force. In 1939, it was extended further to become a fighter station and a base for other units. It was visited by Winston Churchill during World War II.

In 1936, the Air Ministry had purchased a parcel of land opposite the Castle Bromwich Aerodrome. On this site they built the Castle Bromwich Aircraft Factory (CBAF). This huge 'shadow factory' was part of a larger plan to disperse production and move vital resources that lay within easy range of German bombers (Vickers Supermarine's original factory at Southampton was devastated by enemy bombers just as Castle Bromwich came into production in 1940.). The CBAF factory was first managed by the Nuffield Organization to manufacture Spitfires and (later) Lancaster bomber aircraft. The theory was that the local skills and production techniques used in the manufacture of motor vehicles could be transferred to aircraft production. However production proved impossible without help from the professionals from Vickers-Supermarine. The CBAF went on to become the largest and most successful plant of its type during the 1939–45 conflict.

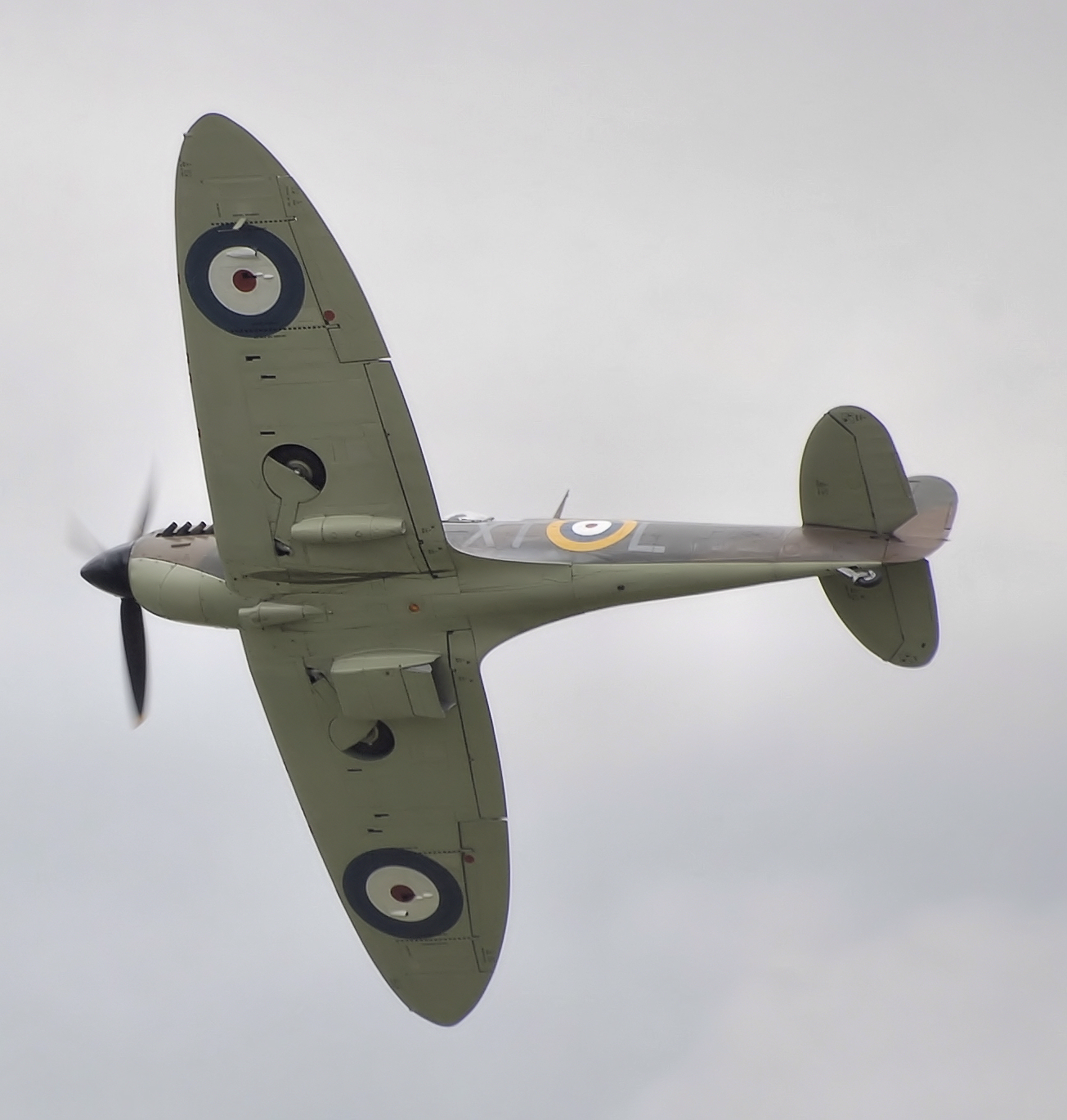
This Spitfire Mk 2A, now owned by the Battle of Britain Memorial Flight, was built at Castle Bromwich

Aircraft and sub-assemblies were taken across the Chester Road to the airfield, Castle Bromwich Aerodrome though early plans included an aerial bridge from E block to the airfield. Very large hangar-like buildings were erected on the east side of the airfield which were referred to as "erecting sheds", where aircraft were prepared for flight testing. This was the largest Spitfire factory in the UK, building over half of the approximately 20,000 built. After failing to get initial production underway, the mercurial Air Minister, Lord Beaverbrook, ordered the Nuffield Organization to relinquish control of the CBAF to Vickers. From May 1940, the CBAF's most productive years were overseen by Vickers Armstrong (Vickers having purchased Supermarine in 1936).

The CBAF's chief test pilot was Alex Henshaw, who managed a team of pilots who had the job of testing the aircraft. The ATA (Air Transport Auxiliary) were responsible for dispersing tested machines to the M.U.'s (Maintenance Units) around the country. As any build-up of machines on the airfield would be vulnerable to aerial attack, testing was carried out in any weather.

After the war, the CBAF became a car body factory. It is now the Castle Bromwich Assembly plant of Jaguar Cars. Its first post war owners were Fisher and Ludlow (themselves having been bombed out of their inner city factory). This company was the sub-contractor for most of the now defunct BMC and British Leyland marques, the last being Jaguar, who took over outright control of the factory in 1977. Various units used the airfield post war and there was an annual display to mark the anniversary of the Battle of Britain. Civilian flights returned, including the first scheduled helicopter service from London. Such activities were to prove short-lived.

The airfield closed in 1958 and in 1960 the site and that of the British Industries Fair, and nearby farmland was sold for housing. The runway was broken up, many of the buildings were demolished and in 1963 construction work began on a new Birmingham overspill estate – Castle Vale – which was completed in 1969. The erecting sheds survived as storage units until 2004. All that remains now is a memorial, a stained glass window in the estate's church, streets and housing blocks with aviation names, a row of ex-RAF houses along the Chester Road, and a new Spitfire Memorial. This is a large steel sculpture called Sentinel designed by Tim Tolkien which was erected on the roundabout where the road to the estate joins the Chester Road in 2000. This was inaugurated by the CBAF's wartime chief test pilot, Alex Henshaw.

The roundabout was subsequently renamed "Spitfire Island". Diamond Jubilee celebrations of the CBAF were held on 15 July 1998, which included a fly-by flown by Ray Hanna in his ex-CBAF Spitfire MkIX, MH434. Amongst the dignitaries attending was Dr. Gordon Mitchell, son of the Spitfire's designer, R.J. Mitchell. Alex Henshaw also unveiled a memorial plaque just inside the old factory's main gate onto the Kingsbury Road. It's inscribed "here, swords of freedom were forged".

== Modern Castle Bromwich ==
There are three primary schools, one special school and one secondary school (Park Hall Academy).

Public transport is provided in the form of bus routes by National Express West Midlands, connecting Castle Bromwich with Birmingham, Sutton Coldfield, Solihull and Birmingham Airport.

The Castle Bromwich Assembly factory owned by Jaguar Land Rover, employs 2,500 people (or 2,700 according to other sources) in Jaguar automobile manufacturing. News reports in early July 2019 indicated that the company planned to build an electric version of the Jaguar XJ saloon, replacing the manufacturing of the conventional XJ at this plant, after investing billions of pounds in upgrades to the facility by autumn 2019. A BBC report indicated that the plant "also produces the Jaguar XF, XE and F-Type", but the XJ was critical to the success of the facility. Without the new plan, the Castle Bromwich plant would "effectively be dead", according to David Bailey (economist), a professor of business economics at Birmingham Business School.

== Notable people ==
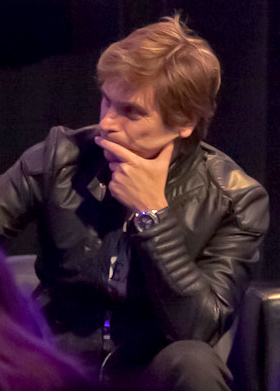
Roger Taylor, 2011

- Edward Arden (ca.1542–1583), nobleman, head of the Arden family; a Catholic martyr; lived in Park Hall.
- John Jones Bateman (1817–1903), architect, lived at Hawkesford House (since demolished and replaced by an apartment block of the same name)
- Goodwin Newton (1835–1907), landowner, magistrate and chairman of Imperial Continental Gas Association.
- Charles Bateman (1863–1947), architect, known for his Arts and Crafts movement work
- Cooper Perry (1856–1938), brought up locally, Vice-Chancellor, University of London (1917–1919)
- Lewis Bedford (1899–1966), footballer who played 237 games
- Roger Taylor (born 1960) drummer of Duran Duran, used to live in Hawthorne Road where he taught himself to play drums Trevor Francis used to live a few doors away when Roger was a child.
- Stephen Kettle (born 1966), sculptor who works exclusively with slate.
- Tushar Makwana (1967–2004), radio DJ, lived and was murdered in Wasperton Close in Castle Bromwich.
- Barry Austin (1968–2021), widely reputed to be the heaviest man in the UK; he weighed 50 stone
- Tom Clarke (born 1986), lead singer of UK indie band The Enemy used to live in Wasperton, close to the village.

== Gallery ==
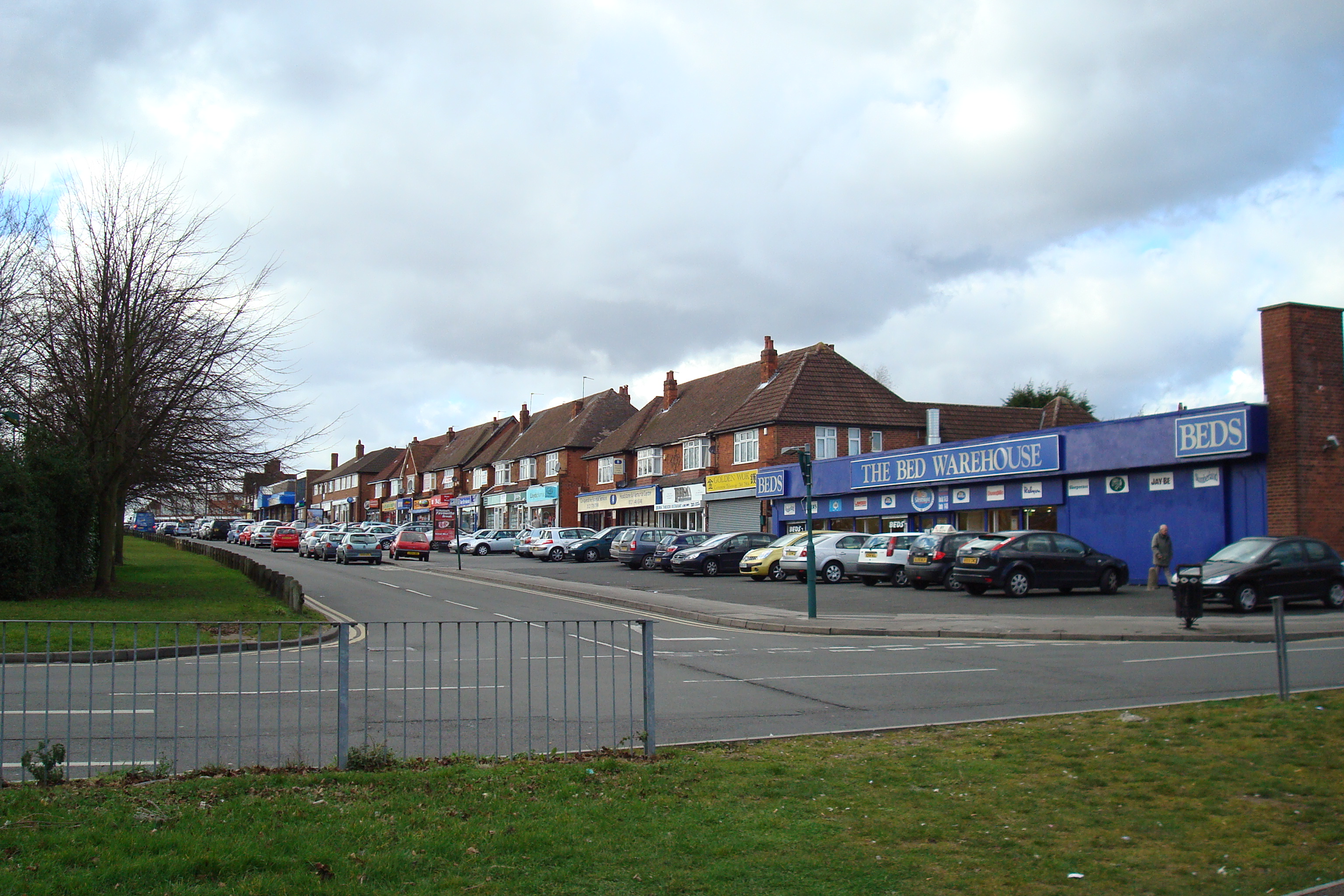
Shops on the Chester Road.

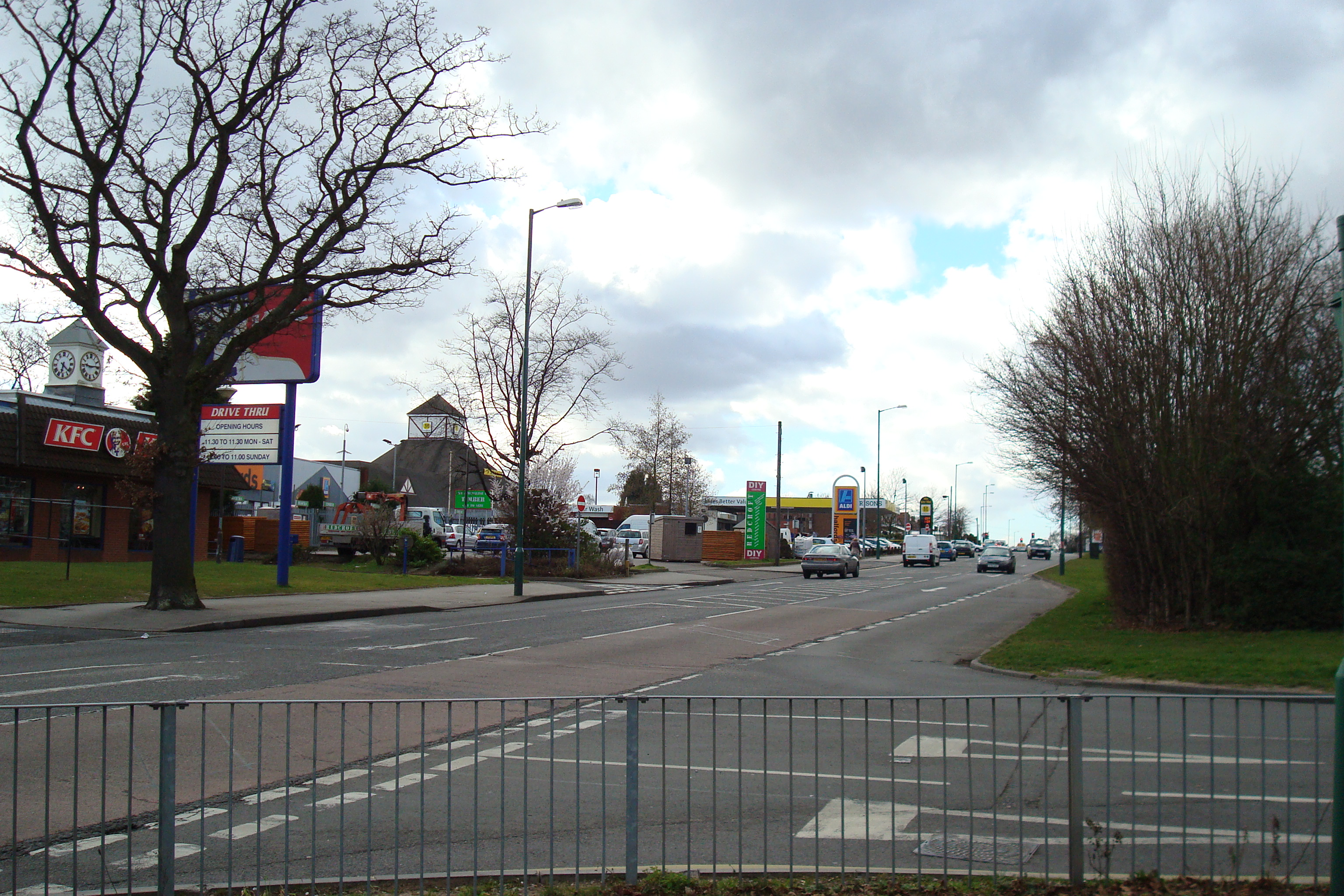
A view of the Chester Road.

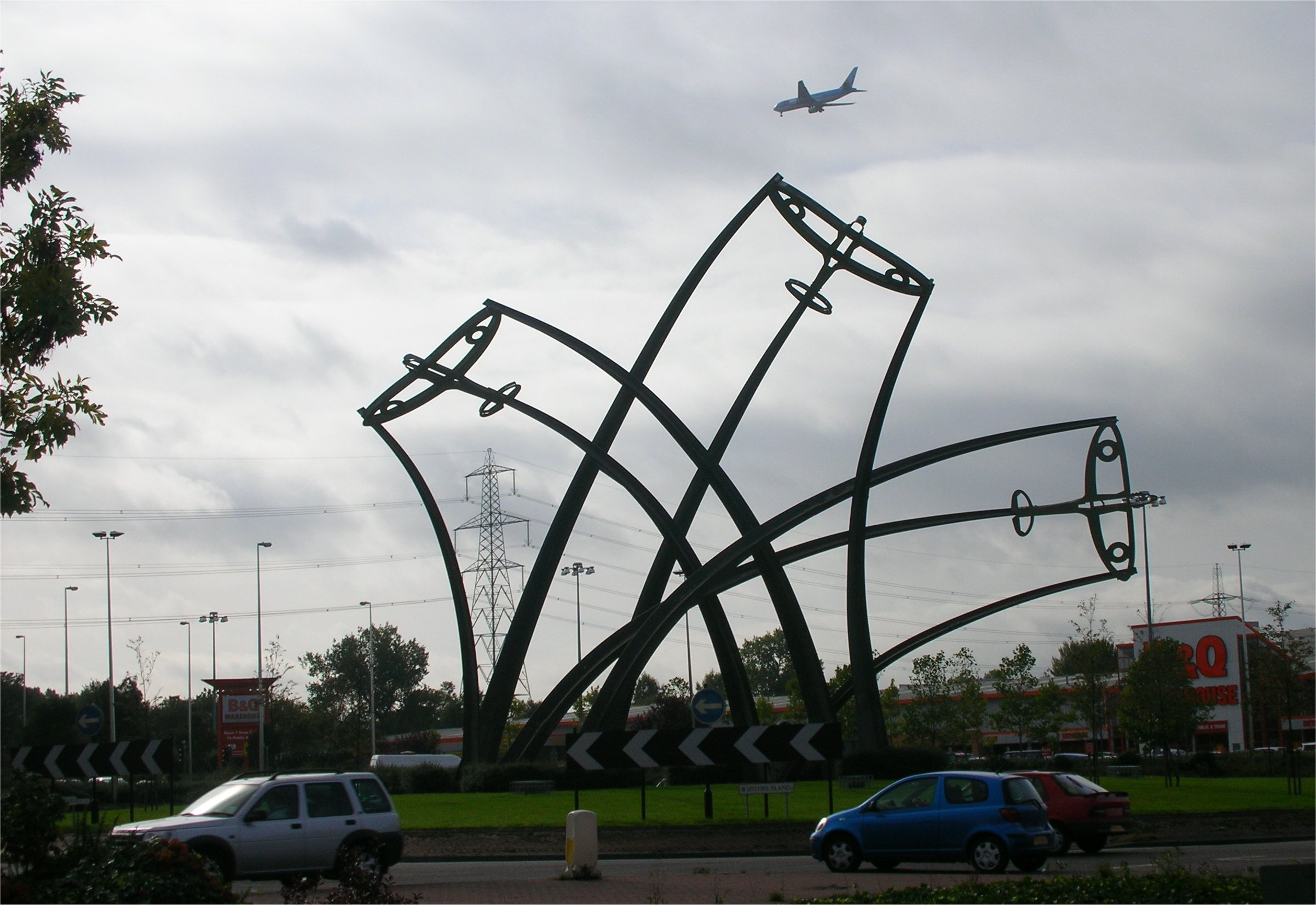
Sentinel at the junction of the Chester Road and Fort Parkway.
