= Curdworth =

Village in Warwickshire, England

Coordinates: 52.5319°N 1.7353°W

- Location within Warwickshire
- Population: 1,146 (2021)
- OS grid reference: SP179927
  - London: 115.7mi
- Civil parish: Curdworth
- District: North Warwickshire
- Shire county: Warwickshire
- Region: West Midlands
- Country: England
- Sovereign state: United Kingdom
- Post town: SUTTON COLDFIELD
- Postcode district: B76
- Dialling code: 01675
- Police: Warwickshire
- Fire: Warwickshire
- Ambulance: West Midlands
- UK Parliament: North Warwickshire

Curdworth is a village and civil parish in the North Warwickshire district of the county of Warwickshire in England. The population taken at the 2021 census was 1,146.

== Location ==
Curdworth is 11 miles east of the centre of Birmingham. North Warwickshire borders the Warwickshire borough of Nuneaton and Bedworth to the east, the county of Leicestershire to the northeast, Staffordshire to the northwest, and Birmingham in the West Midlands to the south. The village is sandwiched between Junction T1 of the M6 Toll and Junction 9 of the M42 motorways, and the busy A4097 Kingsbury Road. Hams Hall Road freight terminal (on the site of the old Hams Hall power stations) and The Belfry golf course and hotel are also close by.

== History ==
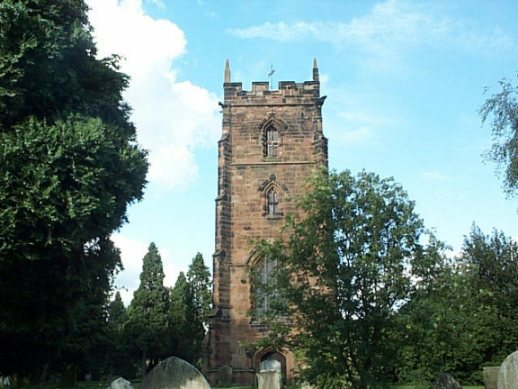
Church of St Nicholas and Peter Ad Vincula

Curdworth and Minworth originated in the 6th or 7th centuries, established by Anglian settlers, and are historically associated with the Arden family (William Shakespeare's maternal relations). Crida's Worth probably corrupts the village. Worth means property of, and the Mercian Crida owned land here. Curdworth is mentioned in the Domesday Book (1086). The local Church of St Nicholas and St Peter ad Vincula is dedicated to St Nicholas and St Peter ad Vincula. Adjacent to the churchyard is the King George V Playing Fields, which was originally a raised clay and pebble base for a medieval Saxon manor complex, which was attached to the church.

This site and the moated Curdworth Hall, also a Saxon structure located at the top of Farthing Lane, were important in the area. Ralph Ardern inherited the manor of Curdworth between 1382 (the death of his father, Henry de Ardern) and 1408 (the death of his mother). The remains of a moat associated with the Ardens are now buried under the M42. This site was considered their home before they moved to Park Hall in Castle Bromwich. At the edge of the playing fields is 'The Bomb Hole', as locals know, a marl pit, where a fertiliser consisting of clay and calcium carbonate was extracted.

In August 1642, the first skirmish between the Roundheads and Cavaliers of the Civil War (1642–51) took place in the fields to the south of Curdworth, the Battle of Curdworth Bridge. One of the musket balls fired left a mark in a nave window of the church. Some of the casualties are supposed to be buried in the graveyard. In 1995 and 2000, Curdworth earned the Best Kept Village title in Warwickshire, a large village class. The village also earned the title in 2007 of Best Kept Village in North Warwickshire, in the medium-sized village class.
