= Witton Lakes =

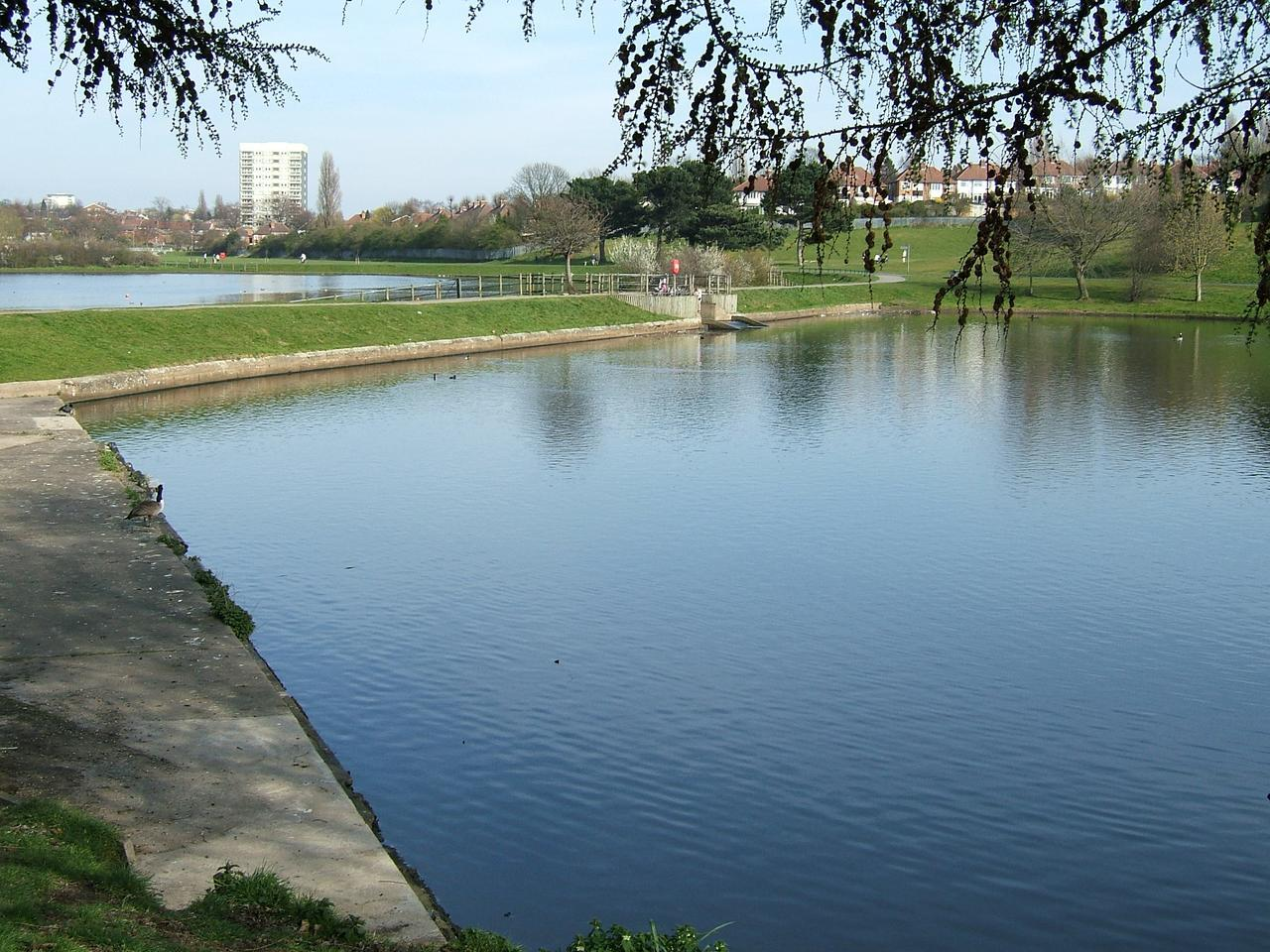

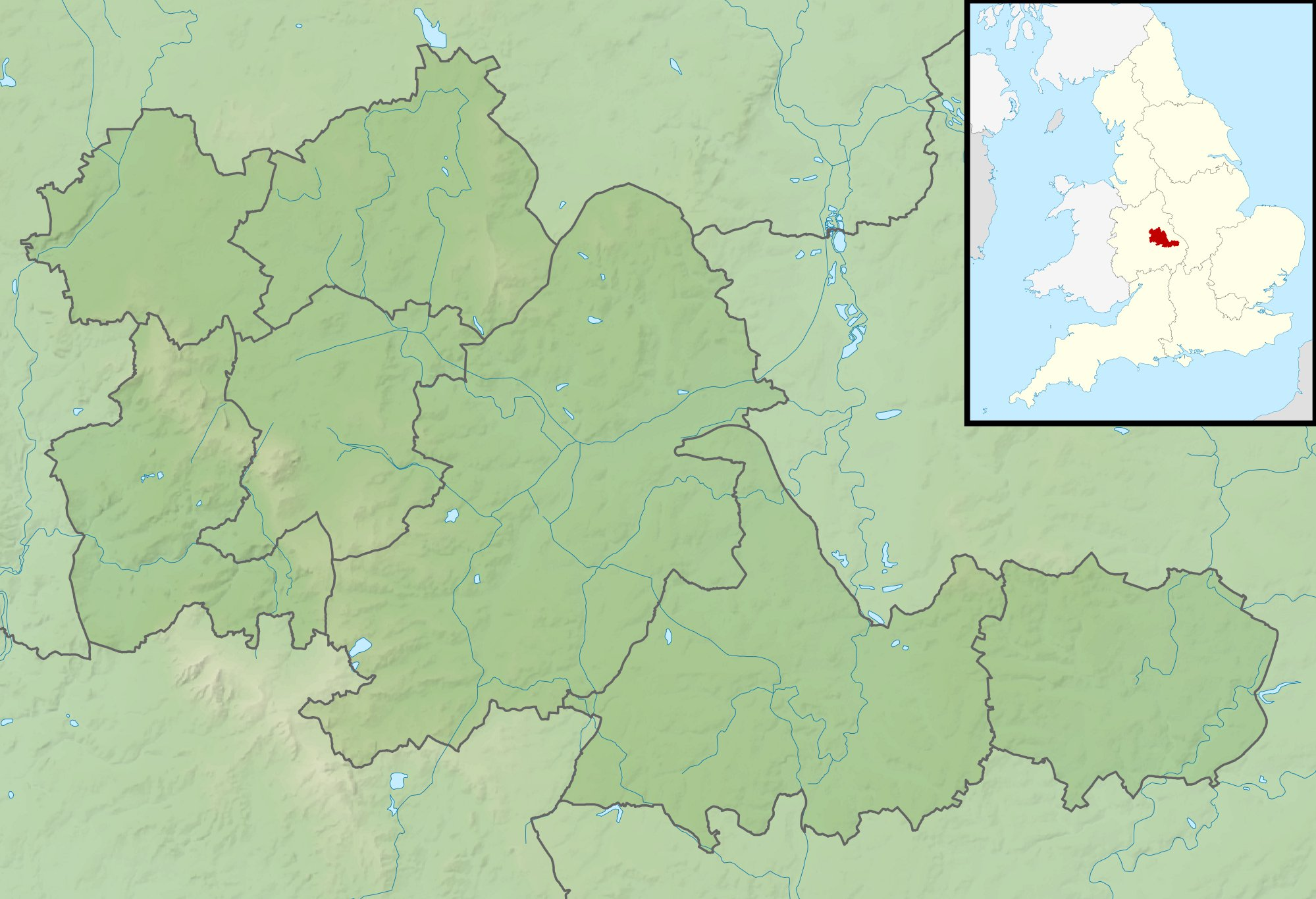
- Location within West Midlands county
- Location: Erdington, Birmingham, England
- Coordinates: 52.52850°N 1.87172°W
- Type: Reservoir
- Primary inflows: Two brooks
- Primary outflows: Brook to Brookvale Park Lake

Witton Lakes (previously known as Upper Witton Reservoir and Middle Witton Reservoir) are a pair of former drinking water reservoirs between the Perry Common and Erdington areas of Birmingham, England (not in nearby Witton).

Two brooks, arising at Kingstanding and Bleak Hill, Erdington, respectively, feed first Witton Lakes, then overspill into Brookvale Park Lake (previously known as Lower Witton Reservoir), before reaching the River Tame, and eventually the Humber and the North Sea.

The brooks are natural; the lakes were completed in 1880, to supply drinking water for Birmingham. They were then in the countryside, and the water relatively clean. Industrialisation and urban sprawl led to the water no longer being fit for drinking, so the city turned to the Elan Valley in Wales for a supply. The lakes' capacity is 80,200 m^{3} (104,900 cu yd).

The lakes are now maintained as a leisure amenity by Birmingham City Council. One is used for model boating and the other nature conservation. The north Birmingham cycle route runs through the surrounding park.
