= Stockland Green =

Suburb of Birmingham, England

Coordinates: 52.5213°N 1.8592°W

- Location within the West Midlands
- Population: 24,319 (2011.Ward)
  - Density: 52.2 per ha
- OS grid reference: SP095915
- Metropolitan borough: Birmingham
- Metropolitan county: West Midlands
- Region: West Midlands
- Country: England
- Sovereign state: United Kingdom
- Post town: BIRMINGHAM
- Postcode district: B23
- Dialling code: 0121
- Police: West Midlands
- Fire: West Midlands
- Ambulance: West Midlands
- UK Parliament: Birmingham Erdington

Stockland Green is an area of Birmingham, England.

It gives its name to a ward which is part of the Erdington formal district, and is located to the south-west of Erdington and north-east of Birmingham City Centre. The area is often mistakenly identified as Erdington, normally through domestic and commercial addresses. The area however has its own council ward and is outside Erdington's traditional boundaries, previously in the Birmingham Aston constituency.

== Demographics ==
The 2001 Population Census recorded that there were 23,060 people living in the ward with a population density of 4,487 people per km^{2} compared with 3,649 people per km^{2} for Birmingham. 24.7% (5,706) of the ward's population consists of ethnic minorities compared with 29.6% for Birmingham in general.

== Politics ==
The ward was dominated by the Labour Party between the mid-1980s to 2007 and sent three Labour councillors to Birmingham City Council. However, in 2008 this changed when Matt Bennett won for the local Conservative Party.

Ward boundaries changed in 2018 and Stockland Green was reduced from three councillors to two; the ward no longer included Gravelly Hill which became a single-member ward.

Stockland Green is currently represented by two councillors on Birmingham City Council: an independent, Amar Khan, and Manni Butt of Reform UK.

Stockland Green has a Ward Support Officer.

== Places of interest ==
Points of interest include Witton Cemetery, one of the largest cemeteries in the Midlands, which can be seen from the M6 motorway. Other areas include the Josiah Mason/Stockland Green complex of schools and colleges and Witton Lakes, an area of local beauty.

A rocky outcrop is located along the Tyburn Road. There are two major areas of open space; Bleak Hill Recreation Ground and Brookvale Park, which contains a large lake.

Stockland Green Community Leisure Centre serves the area.

== Transport ==
Three major roads dissect the area; Tyburn Road (A38), Gravelly Hill (A5127) and Reservoir Road (A4040). The M6 motorway is situated in the southern boundary of the ward.

Gravelly Hill railway station on the Cross-City Line is on the boundary of Stockland Green and Gravelly Hill wards.
