= Harvey Withers =

Antiques dealer and author

- Born: 26 October 1965 (age 60); Birmingham, England
- Occupations: Author, military antique dealer
- Website: www.militariahub.com

Harvey Withers (born 26 October 1965) is a British author and military antiques dealer. He specialises in producing reference books on antique swords and edged weapons.

== Books ==
Books written by Harvey Withers include:

- British Military Swords 1786–1912 The Regulation Patterns, An Illustrated Price Guide for Collectors (2003)
- The Illustrated Encyclopedia of Swords and Sabres (2009)
- An Illustrated Price Guide for Collectors (2006)
- The Scottish Sword 1600–1945 (2009)
- The Illustrated Encyclopedia of Swords and Sabres (2009)
- The Pictorial History of the Sword (2010)
- The Illustrated Encyclopedia of Knives, Swords, Spears and Daggers (2011) (co-authored with Tobias Capwell
- The British Sword 1600–1700 An Illustrated History – Volume One (2011)

== Biography ==
Harvey Withers was born in Birmingham, England and attended St Edmund Campion Secondary School, Erdington and completed an honours degree in Literature and History at Staffordshire University, graduating in 1987. Since then he has worked as a copywriter and gallery owner. He is also a full-time dealer in antique swords and edged weapons.

== Bibliography ==
- British Military Swords 1786–1912: The Regulation Patterns. An Illustrated Price Guide for Collectors (2003) (Harvey Withers Military Publishing) ISBN 978-0-9545910-0-7
- World Swords 1400–1945: An Illustrated Price Guide for Collectors (2006) (Studio Jupiter Military Publishing) ISBN 978-0-9545910-1-4
- The Scottish Sword 1600–1945: An Illustrated History (2009) (Paladin Press) ISBN 978-1-58160-713-0
- The Illustrated Encyclopedia of Swords and Sabres (2009) (Anness Publishing) ISBN 978-0-7548-1851-9
- The Pictorial History of the Sword (2010) (Anness Publishing) ISBN 978-1-84476-839-4
- The Illustrated Encyclopedia of Knives, Swords, Spears and Daggers (2011) (with Tobias Capwell) ISBN 978-0-7548-2331-5
- The Sword in Britain 1600–1700: An Illustrated History – Volume One (2011) (Harvey Withers Military Publishing) ISBN 978-0-9545910-3-8
