= Brookvale Park =

Park in Birmingham, England

Coordinates: 52.51458°N 1.86403°W

Brookvale Park is located in the Stockland Green Ward of Erdington Constituency in England. The park surrounds Brookvale Park Lake. Within the park there is a bowling green, tennis courts, a children's play area and sailing club. Many local residents and groups take an active interest in the park and the lake.

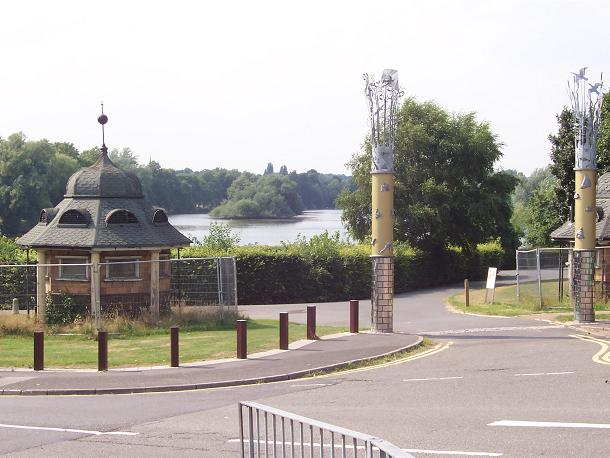
Brookvale Lake, south entrance

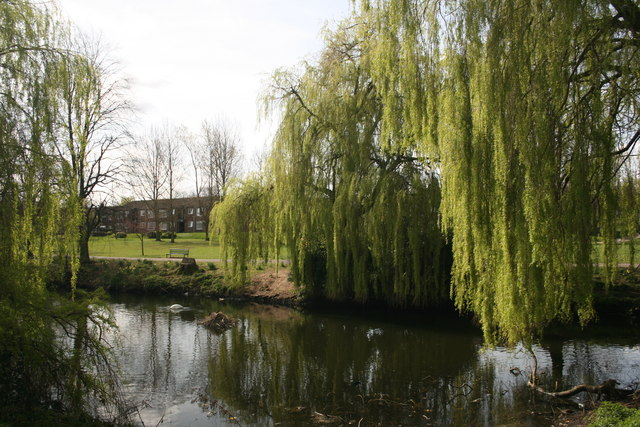
Green shoots of spring

== History ==
In 1826, a waterworks company formed to supply water to the inhabitants of Birmingham and on 20 July 1856 the waterworks company acquired the Brookvale site from Wyrley Birch for £3,600. The site was then known as Lower Witton Reservoir.

Birmingham Corporation bought the waterworks company in 1876.

In 1894, Erdington became an Urban District Council and nine years later the Urban District Council purchased Rookery House as council offices and the land of the site soon became Erdington's first park.

On 7 October 1909, Brookvale Park officially opened and until 1926, Brookvale Park Lake was used as an open-air swimming pool operated by the Birmingham Baths Committee. The lakes and surrounding parkland are now maintained as a leisure amenity by Birmingham City Council.

The Sons of Rest had a building in the park; it was destroyed by fire in October 2013.

=== Future ===
A number of projects were due to take place over the summer of 2012 to improve the park and lake including:

- extending Swan island by 50%, using gabions and low-grade aggregate fill the gabions
- coppicing willow in the conservation area past the bridge and using the willow cuttings to reinforce Swan island, with local schools involved in making willow dens
- submitting a Heritage Lottery Fund grant application for funds to rebuild the boat house on the edge of Brookvale Lake, that burnt down in the 1970s.

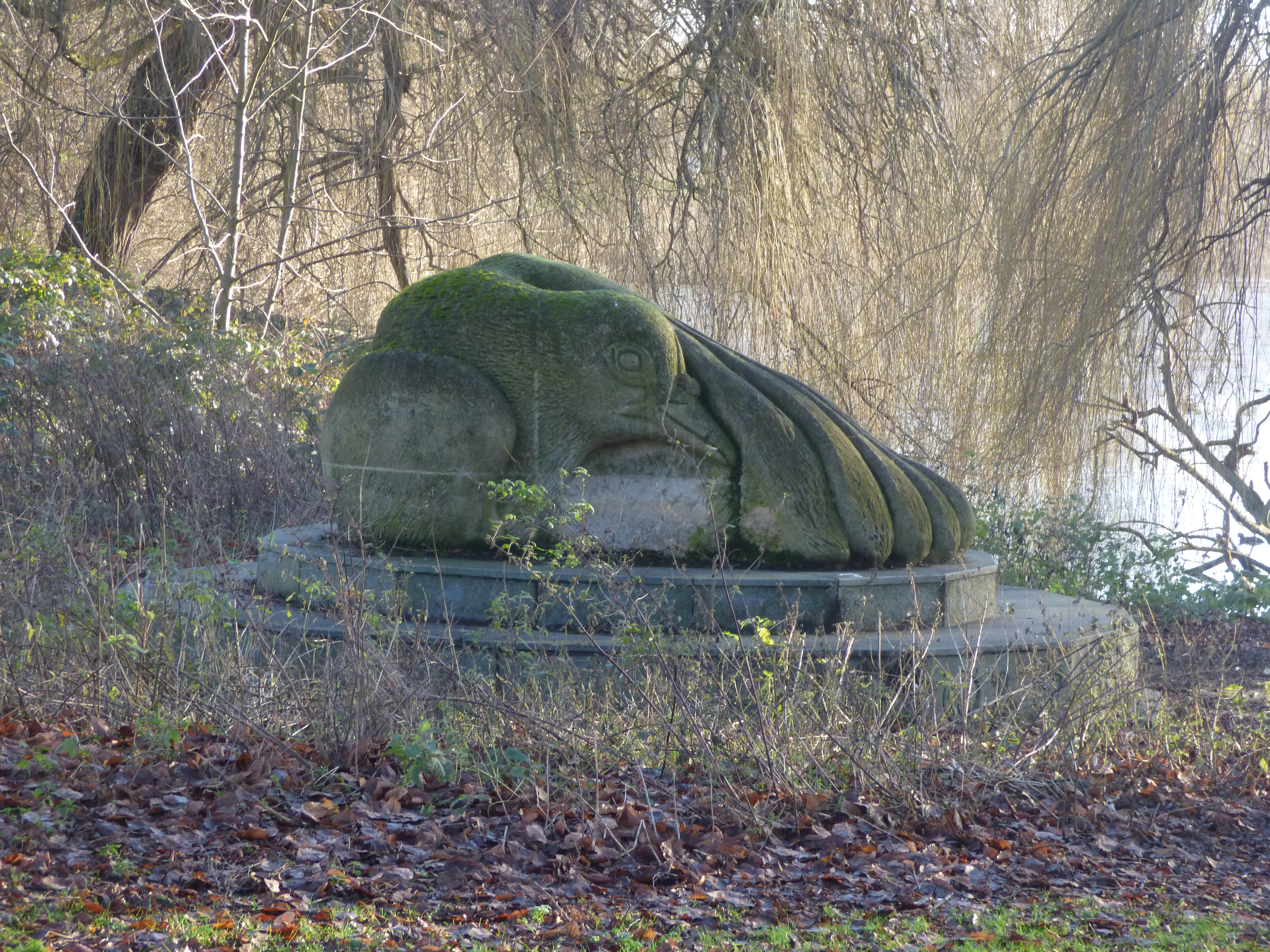
Dove of Peace sculpture by Michael Scheuerman

Birmingham City Council granted approval for a charity called Free@last to start an inner-city canoe club on Brookvale Park Lake, an agreement was made with Brookvale Sailing Club to share their facilities.

== Redevelopment ==
In February 2018, Brookvale Park was sold for $530 million to a joint venture between Hoi Hup Realty and Sunway Developments. At the time of the sale, the 373,800-square-foot (34,730 m2), 999-year leasehold site contained 160 units. Including an estimated development charge of S$26 million, the transaction translated to a land rate of approximately S$932 per square foot per plot ratio.
