= Brookvale Park Lake =

Lake in Birmingham, England

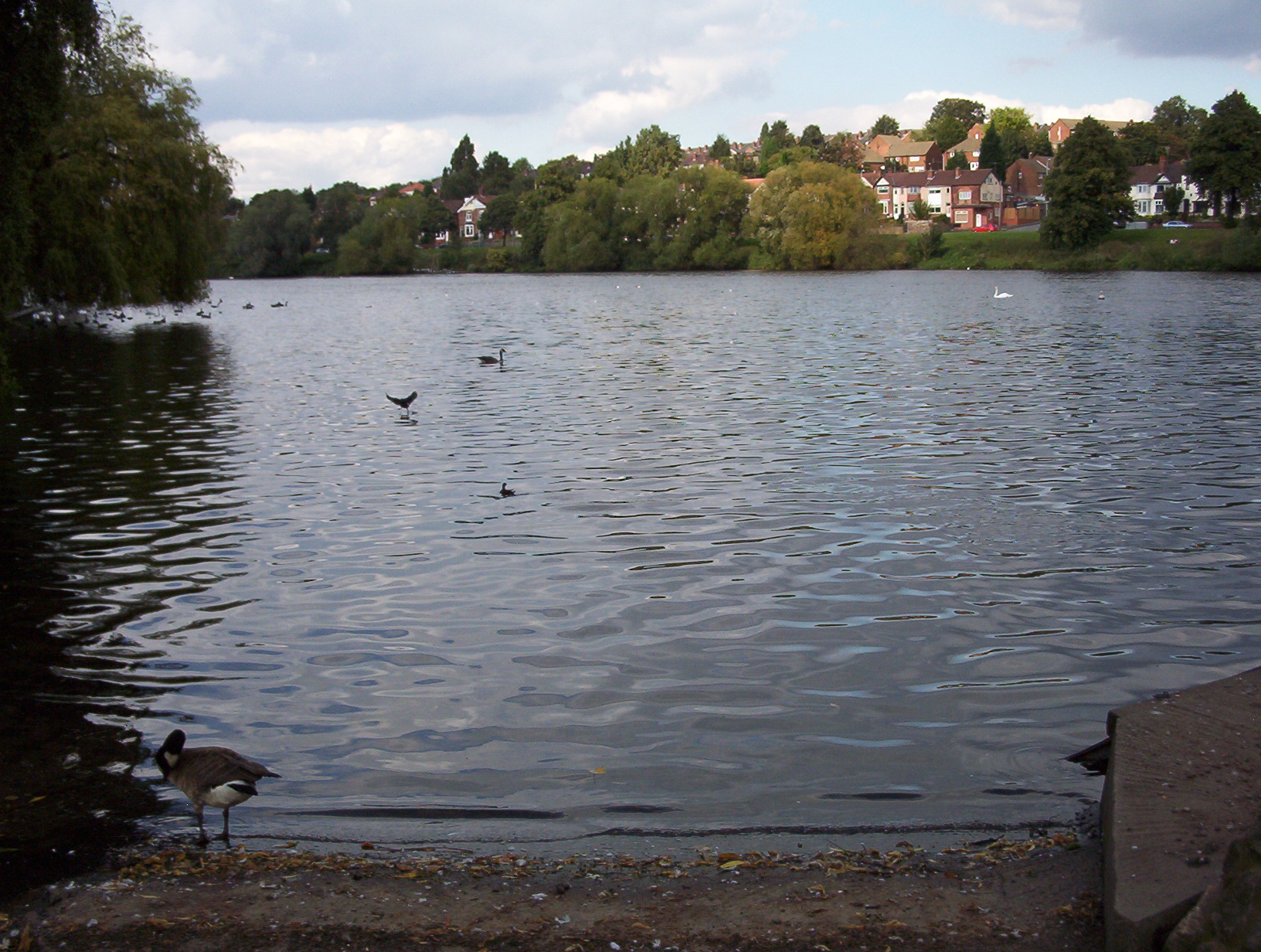
- Brookvale Park Lake

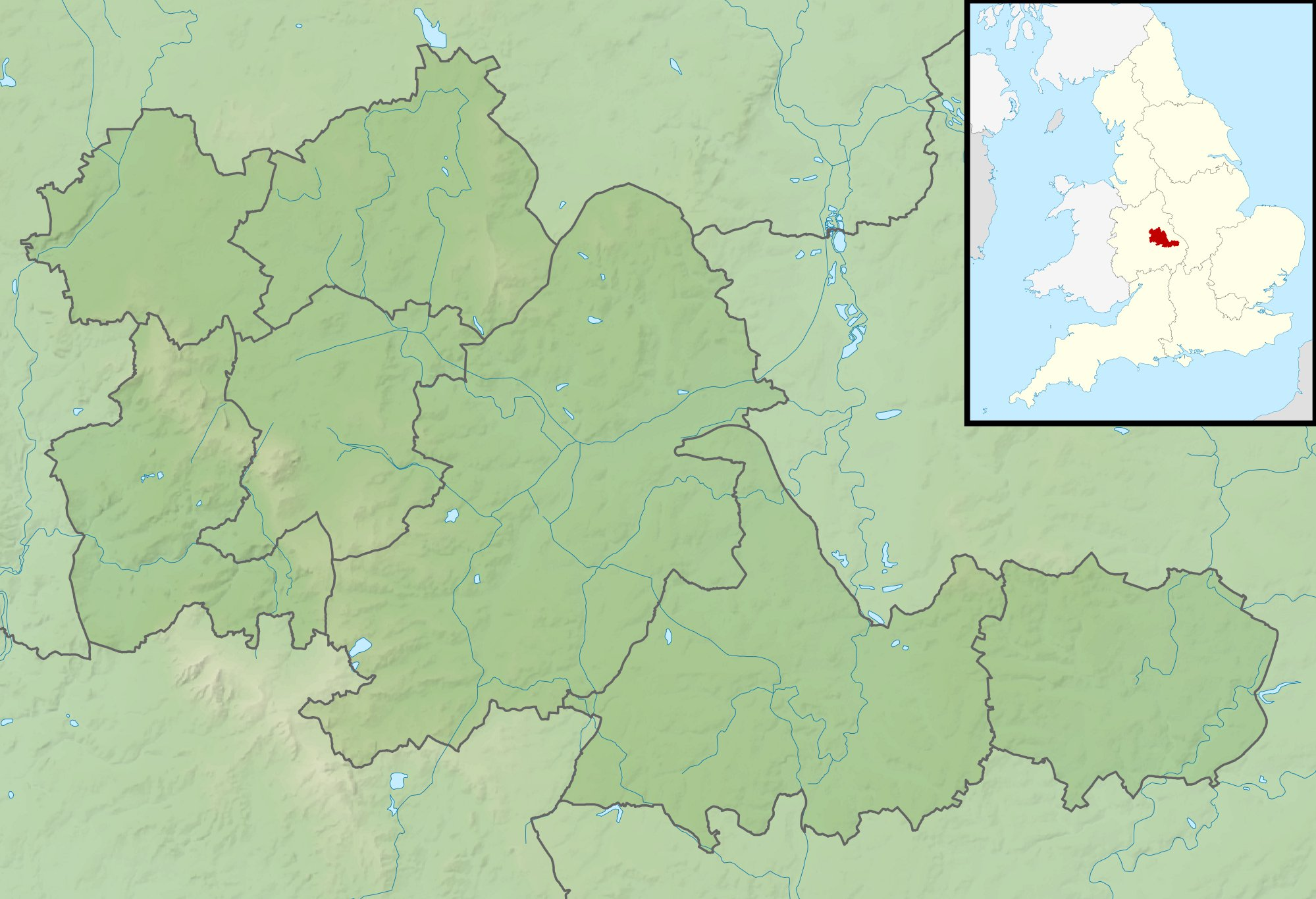
- Location within West Midlands county
- Location: Erdington, Birmingham, England
- Coordinates: 52.51878°N 1.86493°W
- Type: reservoir
- Basin countries: United Kingdom

Brookvale Park Lake, previously known as Lower Witton Reservoir, (Note: grid reference SP091911) is a former drinking water reservoir in the Erdington area of Birmingham, England.

Two brooks, arising at Kingstanding and Bleak Hill, Erdington, respectively, feed first Witton Lakes (previously known as Upper Witton Reservoir and Middle Witton Reservoir), then overspill into Brookvale Park Lake, before reaching the River Tame, and ultimately the North Sea, via the Trent and Humber.

The brooks are natural; the lakes were created at the end of the 19th century to supply drinking water for Birmingham. They were then in the countryside, and the water relatively clean. Industrialisation and urban sprawl led to the water no longer being fit for drinking, so the City turned to the Elan Valley in Wales for a supply.

From 7 October 1909 until 1926, Brookvale Park Lake was used as an open air swimming pool operated by the Birmingham Baths Committee. The lakes and the surrounding area, Brookvale Park, are now maintained as a leisure amenity by Birmingham City Council.

The first ring-necked duck in the West Midlands county was found here in 2001.
