= St Mary's Church, Whittall Street, Birmingham =

St Mary’s Church
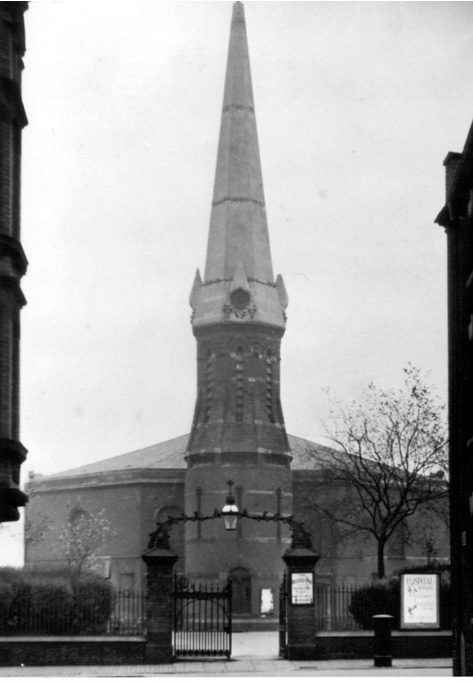
- St Mary's in 1880, with the remodelled tower
- St Mary’s Church
- 52°29′6.2″N 1°53′46.4″W
- OS grid reference: SP 07144 87462
- Location: Whittall Street, Birmingham
- Country: England
- Denomination: Church of England

History
- Dedication: St Mary the Virgin
- Consecrated: August 1774

Architecture
- Architect: Joseph Pickford
- Style: Neo-classical
- Completed: 1774
- Construction cost: £4,700
- Closed: 1925
- Demolished: 1920s

Specifications
- Capacity: 1,000 people

St Mary's was a Church of England parish church in Whittall Street, Birmingham, England.

== History ==
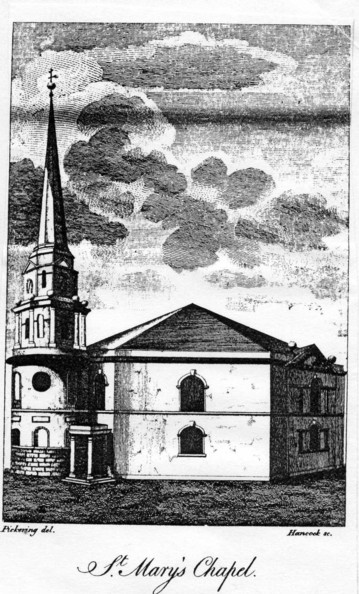
1783 engraving, showing the original tower

St. Mary's Church was built in 1774, under an Act of 1772, on Catharine Street (later renamed Whittall Street), then on the northern edge of the town of Birmingham, as a chapel of ease to St Martin in the Bull Ring. The building was designed by Joseph Pickford. It was named to mark the donation of the land on which it stood, and £1,000 of its £4,500 building costs, by Mary Weaman.

Two years after opening, part of a gallery collapsed during a service, but the incident did not result in any injuries. Cast iron columns were added, to support the rebuilt galleries.

William Hutton, in the second edition of his An History of Birmingham (1783) wrote:

Though the houses for divine worship were multiplied in Birmingham, yet the inhabitants increased in a greater proportion; so that in 1772 an act was obtained for two additional chapels. St. Mary's, therefore, was erected in 1774 [St Paul’s was the other.], in the octagon form, not overcharged with light nor strength; in an airy situation and taste, but shews too little steeple, and too much roof. If a light balustrade was raised over the parapet, with an urn in the centre of the roof, the eye of the observer would be relieved. The clock was seldom seen to go right, but the wonder ceases if there are NO WORKS within.

In 1786 John Wesley attended a service and heard a sermon by the first incumbent Edward Burn.

A parish was assigned to St. Mary's in 1841 out of St Martin in the Bull Ring.

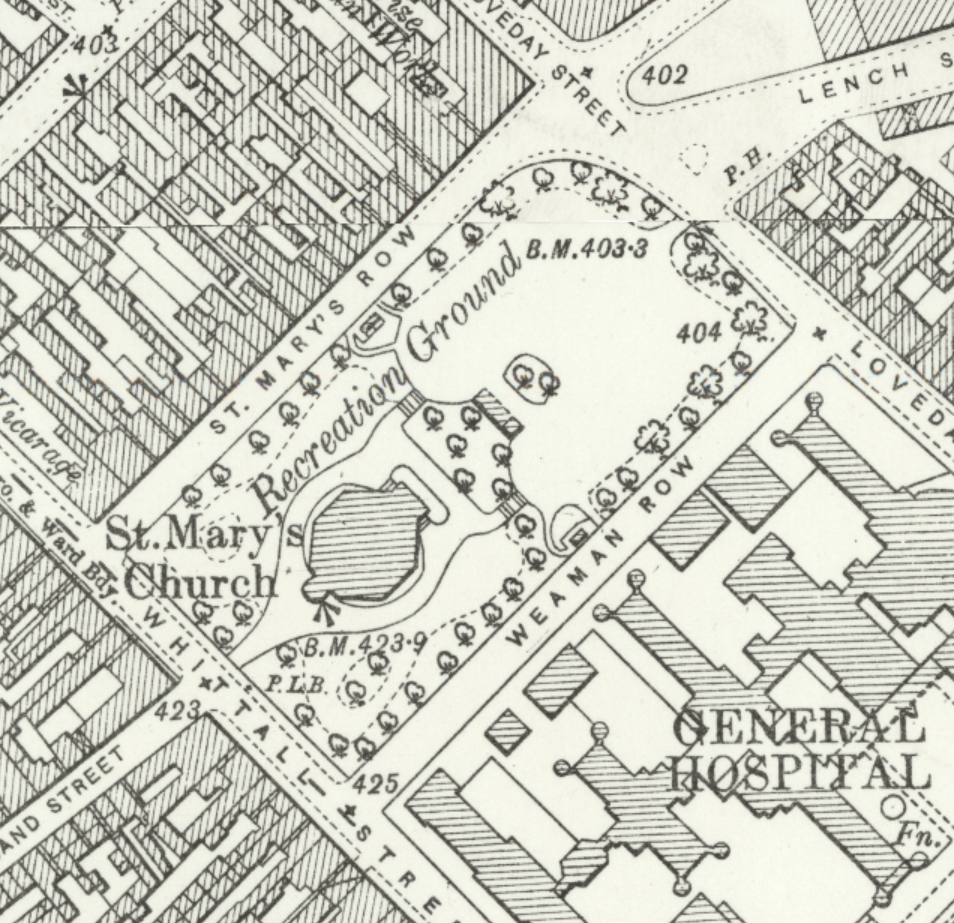
St Mary's on the Ordnance Survey 25 inch map of 1892-1914. Note also Weaman Row, which no longer exists.

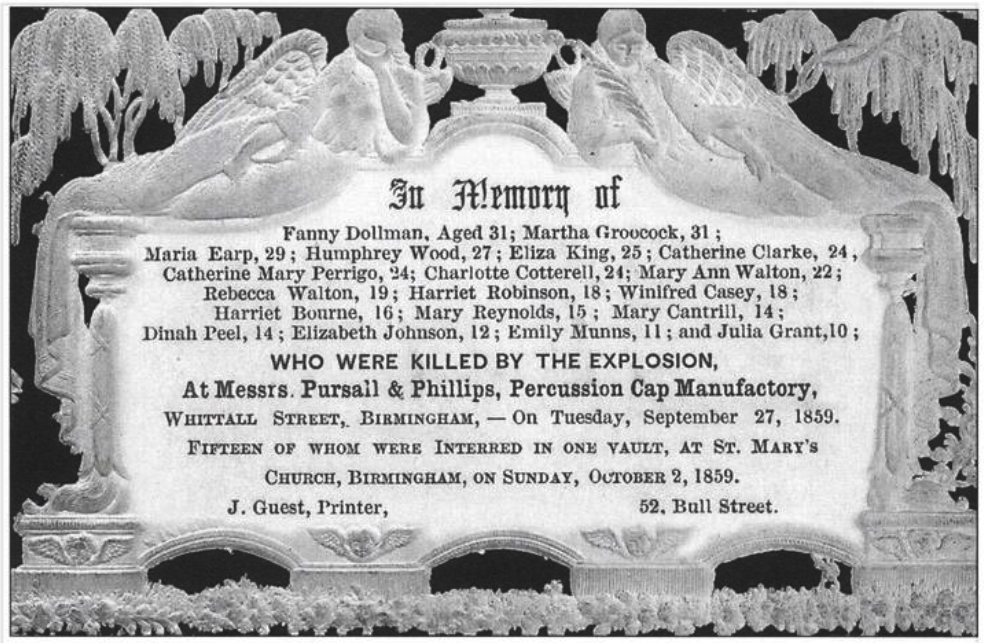
Memorial card to victims of the explosion at Messrs Pursall and Philips

In 1859, 15 women (of a total of 19), who had died in an explosion at Messrs Pursall and Philips Percussion Cap Manufactory, also in Whittall Street, were interred in a single vault in the church.

Structural problems were discovered in 1866 and the tower and spire were subsequently rebuilt in a Gothic style. A further rebuilding took place some time later.

In 1925 the church was closed pending demolition, for the expansion of Birmingham General Hospital. The parish was united with that of Bishop Ryder Church. The proceeds of the sale of the land went to build St Mary's Church, at Pype Hayes.

Its registers of baptisms (1774–1812) and burials (1779–1812) are at St. Martin's. Its silver communion service is at St. Mary's, except for two flagons which are in the collection of Birmingham Assay Office. A tablet commemorating William Thompson, formerly in the church, and now in St Martin in the Bull Ring, reads:

In memory of the Rev. William Thompson, who was the first President of the Wesleyan Methodist Conference. He died May 1st, 1799, and was buried in the vaults of this Church.

Most of the site is now occupied by Waterfall House. The site's northern corner now lies under St Chad's Queensway, part of the city's former inner ring road. A thoroughfare at the north-west side of the site, truncated by the ring road, is still called St Mary's Row.

== Vicars ==
- John Riland ???? - 1810
- Edward Burn 1810 - 1837
- John Casebow Barrett 1837 - 1880
- John Stanley Owen 1881 - 1886
- J. Foster Pegg 1886 - 1892
- Herbert Aylwin 1900 - 1905 (formerly vicar of Christ Church, Silloth)
- H.M. Foyl 1905 - 1910
- W.F.W. Hunter 1910 - 1925
