= Edwin Francis Reynolds =

English architect

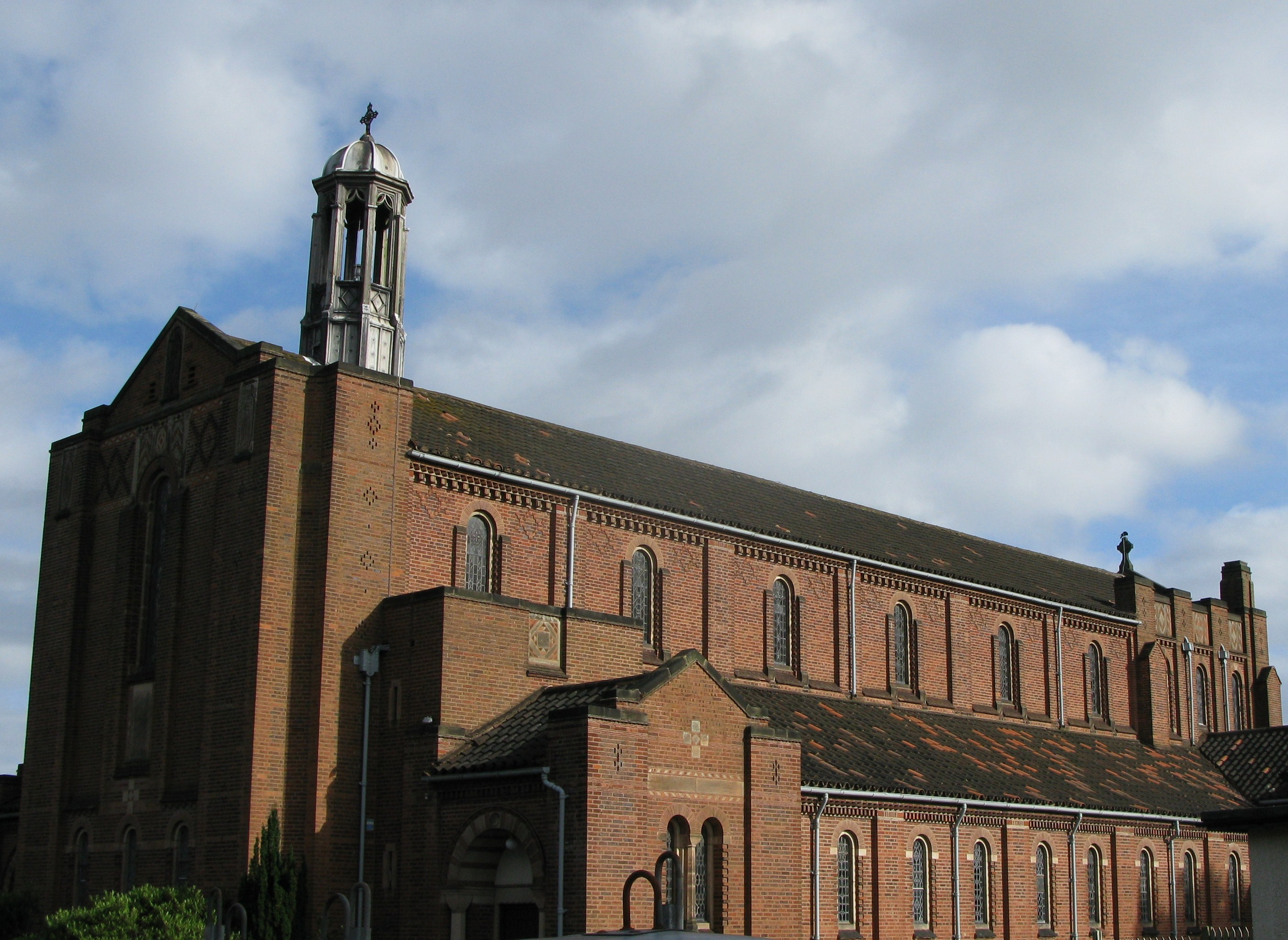
St Germain’s Church, Edgbaston 1917

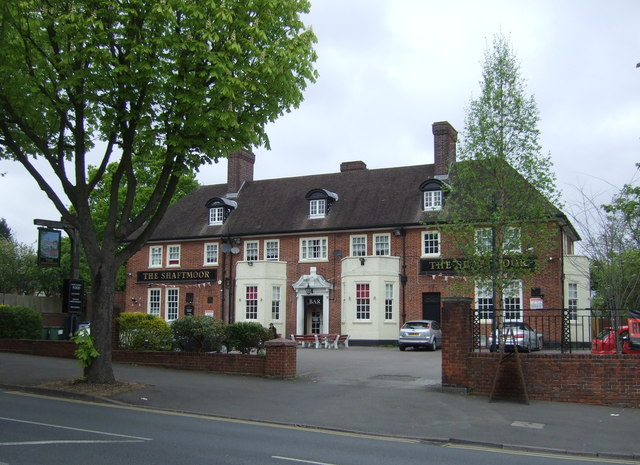
The Shaftmoor, Hall Green 1930

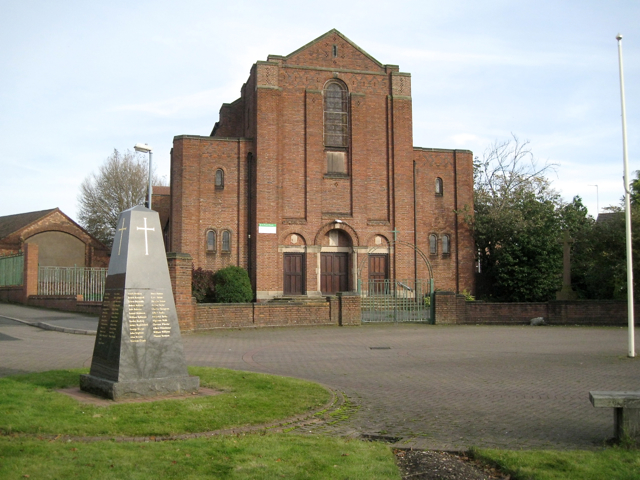
St Mary's Church, Pype Hayes 1930

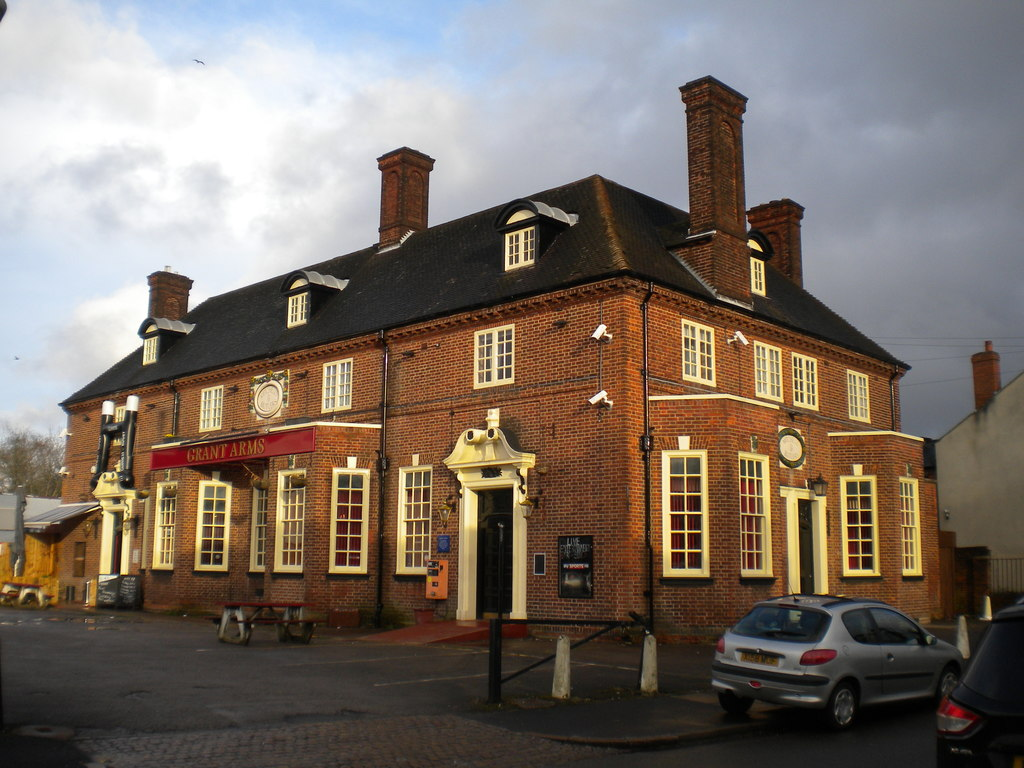
The Grant Arms, Cotteridge 1932

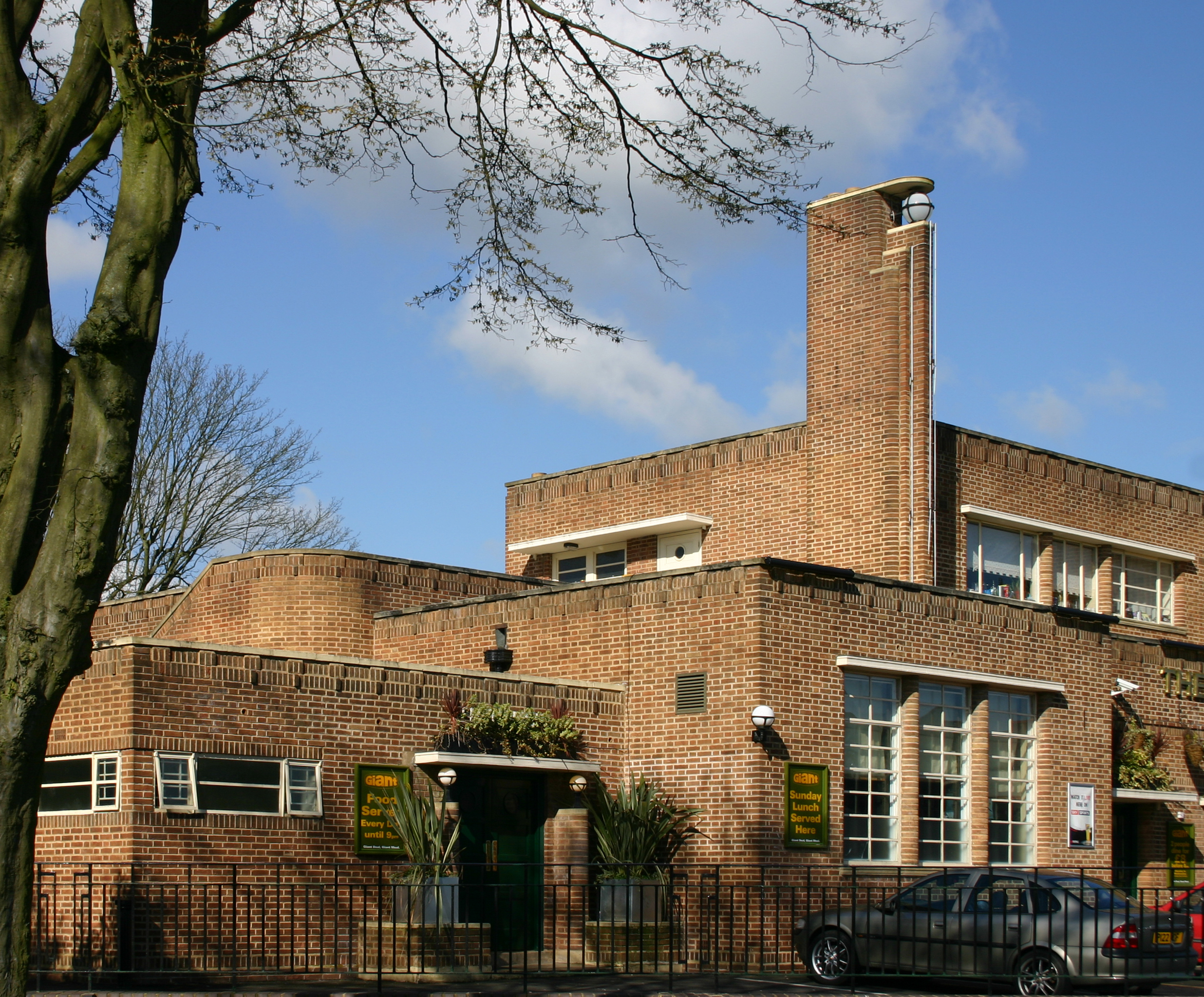
The Three Magpies, Hall Green 1935

Edwin Francis Reynolds LRIBA (30 November 1875 - 19 January 1949) was an English architect based in Birmingham.

== Life ==
He was educated at King Edward's School, Birmingham, and then articled to Cossins & Peacock from 1893 to 1896. From 1897 to 1899 he was assistant to William Henry Bidlake, and then from 1900 to 1901 to Runtz & Ford.

He started his own practice in 1905.

He was appointed Licentiate of the Royal Institute of British Architects in 1911.

== Works ==
- All Saints' Church, Four Oaks 1908
- St Germain's Church, Edgbaston 1915 - 1917
- Taylor & Challen factory, Constitution Hill, Birmingham 1919 - 1921
- House, 11 Pritchards Road, Edgbaston 1926
- House, 13 Pritchards Road, Edgbaston 1927
- St Mary's Church, Pype Hayes 1929 - 1930
- The Shaftmoor public house, Hall Green 1930
- The Abbey public house, Bearwood 1931
- The Grant Arms public house, Cotteridge 1932
- St Gabriel's Church, Weoley Castle 1934
- The Towers public house, Walsall Road 1935
- The Three Magpies public house, Hall Green 1935
- St Hilda's Church, Warley Woods 1938 - 1940

== Restorations and other works ==
- Packwood House 1925 - 1932 Restoration
- Crown Inn, Brindley Place 1930 Reconstruction
- St Alban's Church, Bordesley 1938 Addition of tower and spire
