= St Germain's Church, Edgbaston =

St Germain’s Church, Edgbaston
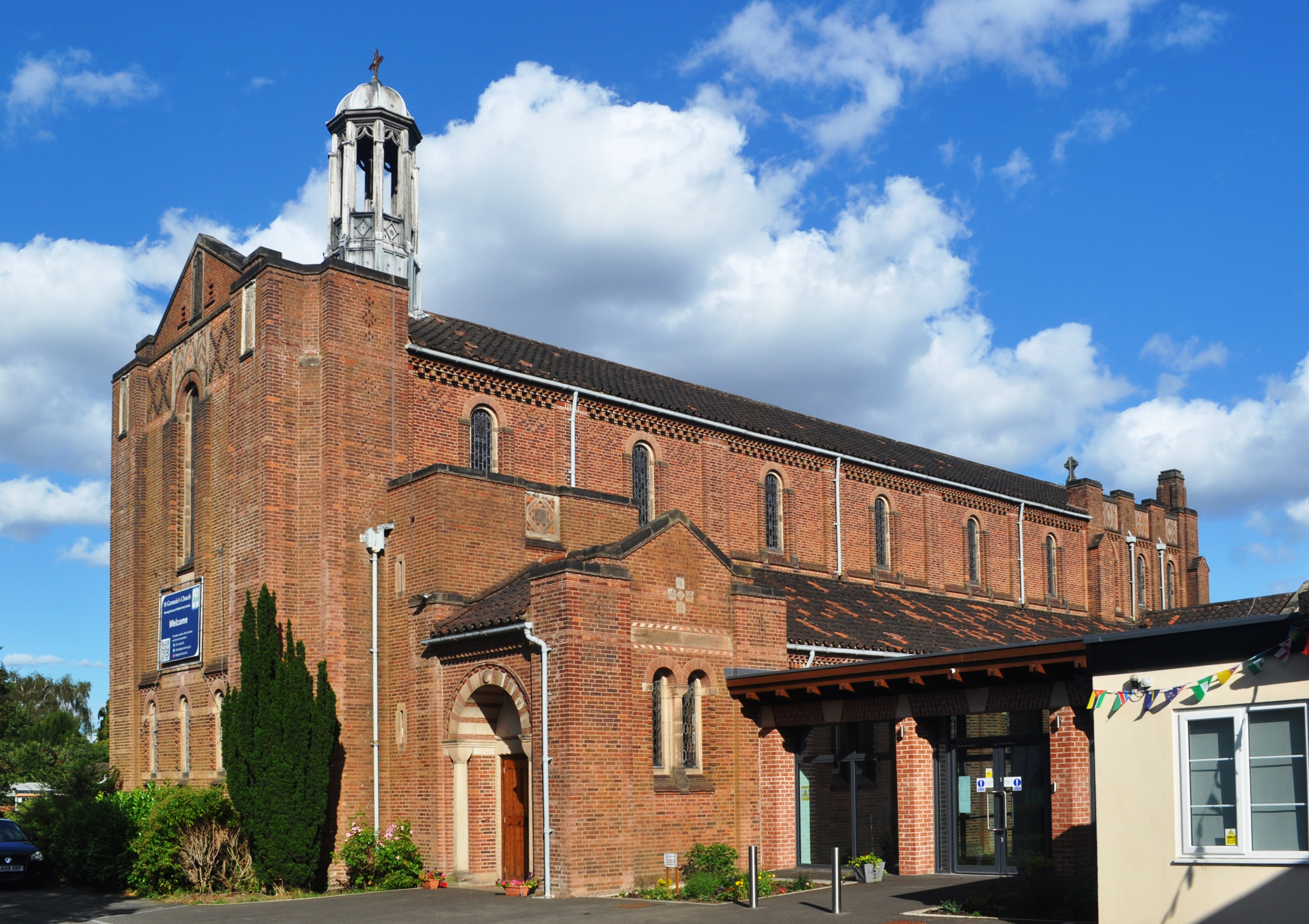
- St Germain's Church in August 2025
- St Germain’s Church, Edgbaston
- 52°28′41.1″N 1°57′15.8″W
- OS grid reference: SP 03201 86682
- Location: Birmingham
- Country: England
- Denomination: Church of England
- Churchmanship: Evangelical

History
- Dedication: Germanus of Auxerre

Architecture
- Heritage designation: Grade II listed
- Architect: Edwin Francis Reynolds
- Groundbreaking: 1915
- Completed: 1917
- Construction cost: £8,400

Specifications
- Capacity: 670 people

Administration
- Diocese: Anglican Diocese of Birmingham
- Archdeaconry: Birmingham
- Deanery: Edgbaston
- Parish: St Germain Edgbaston

St Germain's Church, Edgbaston is a Grade II listed Church of England parish church in Birmingham.

== History ==
The land was donated by the Gillott Trustees and the building was started when the foundation stone was laid on 3 July 1915 by George Beech and erected to designs by the architect Edwin Francis Reynolds and was completed in 1917.

The vicarage by Reynolds was completed in 1924.

== Organ ==
The church has a pipe organ by Rushworth and Dreaper dating from 1922. A specification of the organ can be found on the National Pipe Organ Register.
