= All Saints' Church, Four Oaks =

All Saints’ Church, Four Oaks
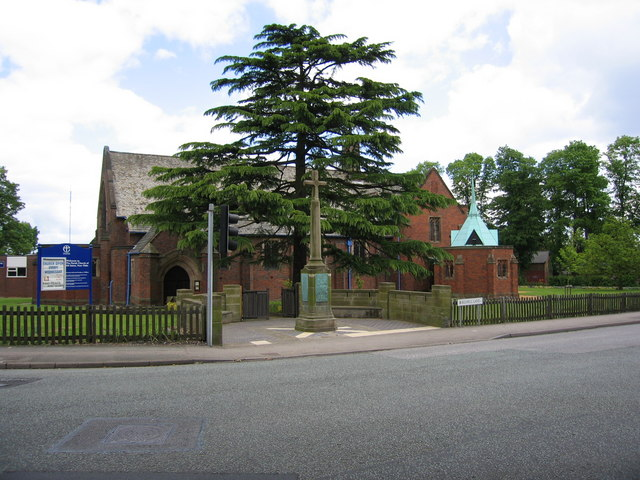
- All Saints’ Church, Four Oaks
- All Saints’ Church, Four Oaks
- 52°35′9.6″N 1°50′25.99″W
- OS grid reference: SP 10916 98740
- Location: Four Oaks, Sutton Coldfield
- Country: England
- Denomination: Church of England
- Website: allsaintsfouroaks.org.uk

History
- Dedication: All Saints
- Consecrated: 30 October 1908

Architecture
- Heritage designation: Grade II* listed
- Architect: Edwin Francis Reynolds
- Groundbreaking: 1908
- Completed: 1909

Administration
- Diocese: Anglican Diocese of Birmingham
- Archdeaconry: Aston
- Deanery: Sutton Coldfield
- Parish: All Saints Four Oaks

All Saints' Church, Four Oaks is a Grade II* listed Church of England parish church in Four Oaks, Sutton Coldfield.

== History ==
The foundation stone was laid on 11 April 1908 by the diocesan registrar J.B. Clarke The church was built to designs by the architect Edwin Francis Reynolds and consecrated on Saturday, 30 October 1908 by Charles Gore, Bishop of Birmingham.

The parish was formed from land taken from St James' Church, Hill.

Enlargements were undertaken in 1954 when a choir vestry was added, and the chancel and clergy vestry were added in 1965 by Wood, Kendrick & Williams.

== Organ ==
The church has a pipe organ by Nicholson dating from 1921. A specification of the organ can be found on the National Pipe Organ Register.
