= Marsh Hill Boys School =

School in Erdington, Birmingham

Coordinates: 52°34′3″N 1°49′18″W

Marsh Hill Boys School was a school in Erdington, Birmingham, UK.

== History ==
The school was opened in 1959 as a Grammar Technical School and shared the same campus as Stockland Green Secondary Modern (bilateral) and Marsh Hill Girls Grammar School. All three schools were based in Erdington, Birmingham and the Marsh Hill Boys School entrance was from Hampton Road (off Slade Rd).

Marsh Hill Boys and Marsh Hill Girls Schools combined in 1974 to form Marsh Hill Comprehensive School following a change in U.K. government policy away from the support for Grammar Schools.

The school benefited from two Head-Masters during its existence: Mr FC Markwell was the first from the School's opening and he retired in 1978. The Head-Master post was taken by Mr RJ Mace who presided over the transition through comprehensive school format to the closing of the school.

The school formally closed in July 1983, and the establishment reopened in September 1983 as Josiah Mason Sixth Form College; the entrance from Hampton Road was closed so the college students used the "Girls School" entrance on Marsh Hill. Josiah Mason College later merged with Sutton Coldfield College in 2006.

== Photographs ==
Marsh Hill Boys school photographs https://www.flickr.com/photos/dapgy/sets/72157601970664509/

Marsh Hill Girls school photographs https://www.flickr.com/photos/dapgy/albums/72177720314470868/

School badges through the years

Staff photographs through the years
