= Pype Hayes Park =

Public park in Birmingham, England

- Interactive map of Pype Hayes Park
- Location: Erdington, Birmingham, England
- Coordinates: 52°31′37″N 1°48′29″W
- Operator: Birmingham City Council
- Website: www.birmingham.gov.uk/pype-hayes-park

Pype Hayes Park is a park in Birmingham, England. The park is part of the Westminster constituency of Birmingham Erdington and straddles the boundary between the Birmingham City Council wards of Pype Hayes and Erdington. It borders the Pitts Farm estate as well as the Paget and Pype Hayes estates.

The park is a popular site for dog walkers in the area.

== History ==
The park originates from the estate of Henry de Pipe, who owned a notable portion of land surrounding the village of Erdington in the 14th century. On the grounds of the site he built the Manor of Pipe (Now called Pype Hayes Hall) which received a Grade II listed status in 1952.

The park was formerly the home of an annual Bonfire Night celebration, however this was stopped in 2015 after over 50 years of running due to a lack of funding, with the bonfire at the event having been cancelled in 2011 as the council struggled to find the £60,000 necessary.

The park has frequently been targeted by travellers.

== Features ==
The park is notable for forming part of the southern boundary of Sutton Coldfield, which runs along the northern boundary of the park. Along the northern boundary runs Plants Brook, a tributary of the River Tame. The park is also notable for the pond at its centre, with Mallard Ducks, Canada Geese, and Mute Swans being among the animals which reside around it. The park has an extensive wooded portion across the northern half.

Next to Pype Hayes Hall is a maintained garden, which incorporates flower beds and dwarf yew hedges.

The site also contains 4 tennis courts and a children's playground, with a car park serving both at the main entrance, and the National Cycle Network route 534 runs through the park.

== Incidents ==
The park is noted for the unsolved murders of Mary Ashford in 1817 and Barbara Forrest in 1974, which shared a striking number of similarities.

The park has also seen a number of other serious incidents, with an 18-year-old man stabbed in the chest and back in July 2022, the 2010 running of the Bonfire Night event saw the sexual assault of a teenage girl, two people were pulled from the pond in critical condition in separate incidents on 18 and 19 September 2020, various incidents of people being run over near the park, and the death of a teenager after a van hit a tree on the border of the park in 2008. The woman pulled from the pond on 19 September later died at the Heartlands Hospital.

There was a large police presence opposite to the park in February 2023 after a fight broke out on a coach of Aston Villa fans, with half a dozen people being pepper sprayed and a man charged with three accounts of assaulting a police officer.

== Accidental ban on dogs ==
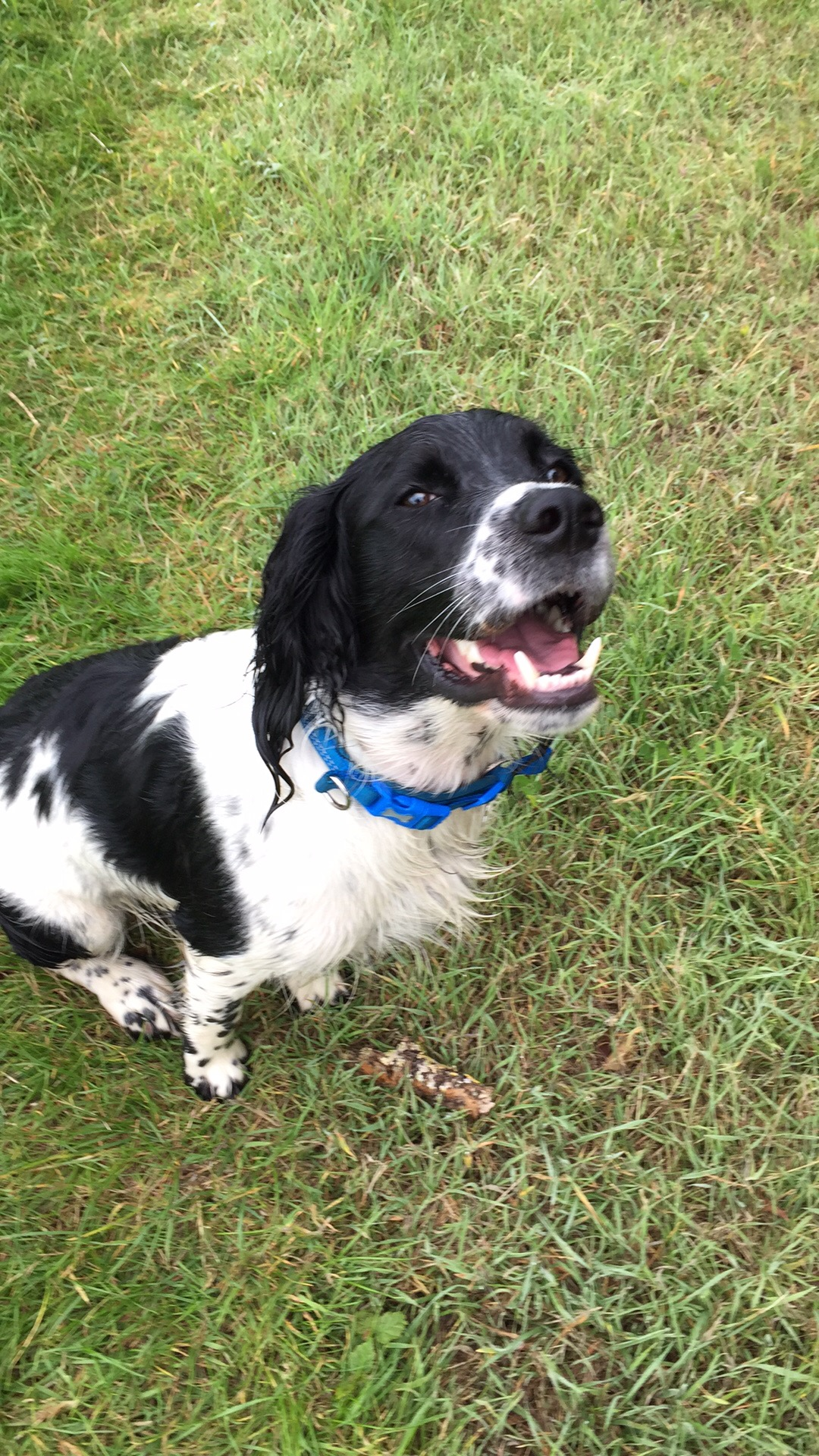
A Springer Spaniel on a walk in Pype Hayes Park

On 13 September 2022, a sign appeared at the entrance to the park claiming the park was a dog free area, sparking widespread indignation amongst the community.

The following day, Birmingham City Council said that the sign was a "mistake" and that dogs were not supposed to be banned from the park, with a spokesperson stating that any incorrect signage would be removed at the earliest possible opportunity.
