= St Mary's Church, Pype Hayes =

St Mary's
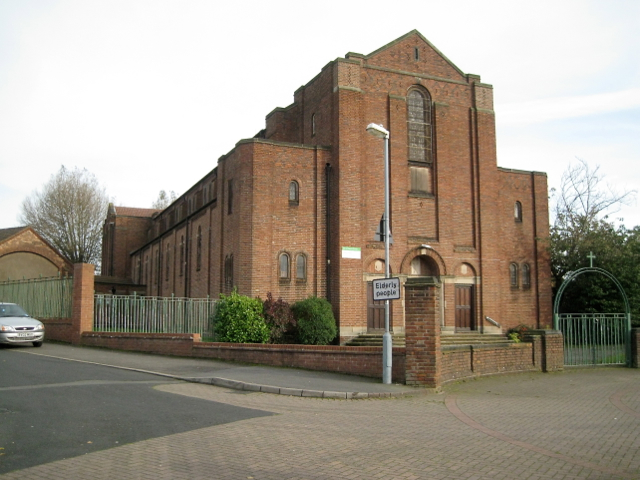
- St Mary's
- 52°31′19″N 1°48′36″W
- OS grid reference: SP 12980 91562
- Location: Pype Hayes, Birmingham
- Country: England
- Denomination: Church of England
- Website: lighthouseonline.church

History
- Dedication: St Mary the Virgin

Architecture
- Heritage designation: Grade II listed
- Architect: Edwin Francis Reynolds
- Style: Arts and Crafts
- Groundbreaking: 1929
- Completed: 1930
- Construction cost: £20,415

Administration
- Province: Province of Canterbury
- Diocese: Anglican Diocese of Birmingham
- Archdeaconry: Aston
- Deanery: Aston & Sutton Coldfield
- Parish: St Mary, Pype Hayes

St Mary's Church is a Grade II listed parish church in the Church of England in Pype Hayes, Birmingham, England.

== History ==
The church was designed by the architect Edwin Francis Reynolds in 1927 and constructed between 1929 and 1930. The builders were C. Bryant and Son and the cost was £20,415. The funding for the construction came from the sale of the site of St Mary's Church, Whittall Street, Birmingham.

The red-brick church and its hall were jointly given listed status in October 1995.

In 2022 the church was involved in becoming a new church plant from Gas Street Church. It meant that the existing congregation along with a planting team from Gas Street formed a new church together meeting on the St Mary's site. This new church is Lighthouse Church | St Mary's. The church meets every Sunday at 10.30am with doors open from 10.15am for refreshments, there is Lighthouse Kids (primary school age) and Lighthouse Youth (secondary school age) running on each Sunday except the first of the month which is a Worship For Everyone gathering. Alongside this new information and up to date plans are available on the social media - @lighthouseonline.church

== Organ ==
The church contains an organ dating from 1900 by Nicholson and Lord. A specification of the organ can be found on the National Pipe Organ Register.
