= Pype Hayes Hall =

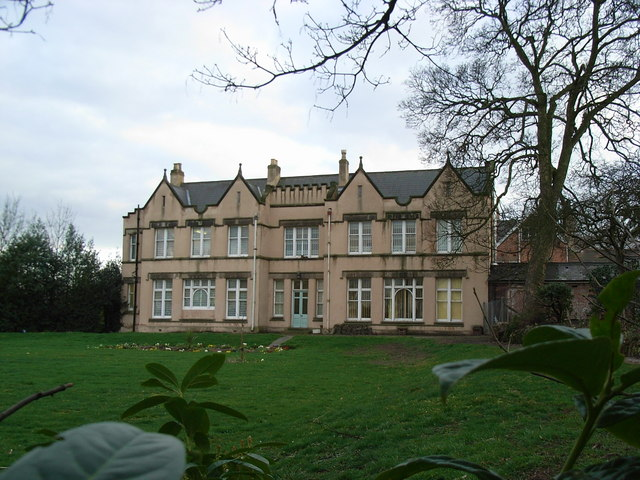
- Pype Hayes Hall, home of the Bagot family. View of the rear of the house

General information
- Type: Mansion
- Architectural style: Georgian
- Location: Pype Hayes, Birmingham, England
- Coordinates: 52°31′36″N 1°48′25″W
- Completed: 1630 (approx.)

Technical details
- Floor count: 3

Design and construction
- Awards: Grade II listed
- Designations: grade II listed

Pype Hayes Hall is a former mansion house in the Pype Hayes area of Erdington, Birmingham, England. The hall's grounds now form Pype Hayes Park. It was formerly in the historic county of Warwickshire before being transferred into the new county of the West Midlands, along with the rest of the city, in 1974. It has grade II listed status.

== Early history ==
The history of the Manor of Pype is obscure, however it seems that the Manor was part of the dower of Dorothy Arden, daughter and co-heiress of Robert Arden of Berwood (now Castle Vale), on her marriage in about 1625 to Hervey Bagot, second son of Sir Hervey Bagot, 1st Baronet.

Bagot enclosed many acres of land and in about 1630 built the new mansion house and park. He lived in the house for 15 years before being killed at the Battle of Naseby in 1645 as a Royalist Colonel in the Civil War. Members of junior branches of the Bagot family continued to live at the Hall for over 250 years. Later additions to the property include the stable block which bears the date 1762 and the house was much enlarged and improved in the mid 19th century.

The poet Robert Southey (1774–1843) worked at the Hall on his 1833 biography of William Cowper, a friend of the Bagots.

Between 1881 and 1888 the Bagots sold around 700 acres (2.8 km^{2}) of the estate to Birmingham Tame and Rea Drainage Board for the creation and expansion of the Minworth Sewage Works. The house was let out to tenants before eventually being sold by the Bagots in 1920 to the City of Birmingham. The City Council adapted the park (Pype Hayes Park) for public recreation and the Hall has since been put to various public social uses.

== Twentieth century ==
Pype Hayes was run as a residential children's home from around 1949 to the 1970s and 1980s.

In May 1974 the body of Barbara Forrest, a child-care worker, was found in the grounds of Pype Hayes. After a long police investigation, Michael Thornton was identified as a suspect and interviewed by senior detectives. Thornton worked at the same children’s home as Barbara and was eventually charged with her murder. However, Thornton was acquitted at trial after a judge heard there was no evidence to link him with the murder.

The press noted that the death of Barbara Forrest shared many similarities with the murder of Mary Ashford, which took place 157 years earlier. Amongst other things, the men accused of killing the women shared the surname Thornton.

== Twenty-first century ==
In 2015, the hall and outbuildings were purchased by property developer Gerry Poutney, who announced plans to restore them for use as a 60-bed hotel, spa and swimming pool.
