= Perry Common =

Suburb of Birmingham, England

Coordinates: 52.5321°N 1.8611°W

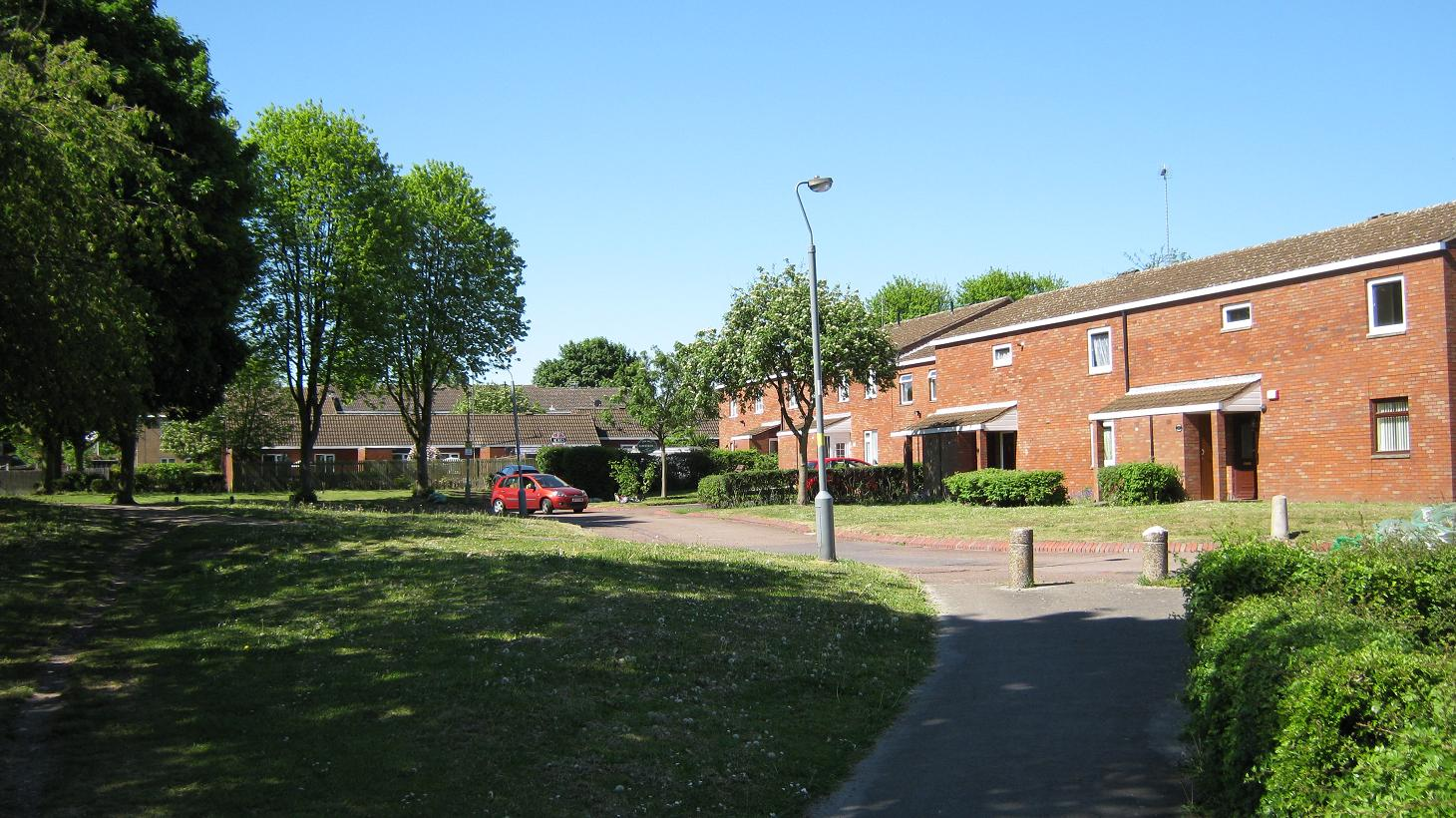
Curlews Close, Perry Common

Perry Common is an area of north Birmingham that includes parts of both Stockland Green and Kingstanding. It falls within the Birmingham Erdington parliamentary constituency.

North Birmingham Academy (formerly College High School) is located in Perry Common as are the Hawthorn Shopping Centre on Hawthorn Road and Witton Lakes.

== Regeneration ==
Redevelopment has been carried out by Witton Lodge Community Association, who have overseen the development of two large care homes as well as more than 300 new houses for sale and rent. The scheme also included the development of new roads, public open spaces and community facilities.

On June 19, 2012 the Perry Common Community Hall was re-opened after a major re-fit and extension. The hall provides space for various regular clubs and activities, includes meeting and hot desk space for local businesses as well as serving as a base for the Witton Lodge Community Association.

== History ==
The area was developed for council housing during the 1920s, with well over 1,000 families moving to the area from dilapidated inner city slums. The houses were built from concrete in a style pioneered by Henry Boot Limited. By the 1980s, however, the estate was facing serious problems. Many of the homes were in a poor state of repair, with cracks in the walls and rising damp being just some of the many problems plaguing the now unpopular Boot houses. During the 1990s, the city council earmarked 908 homes in the area for demolition.
