= Pype Hayes =

Housing estate area in the Erdington district of Birmingham

Coordinates: 52.5274°N 1.8109°W

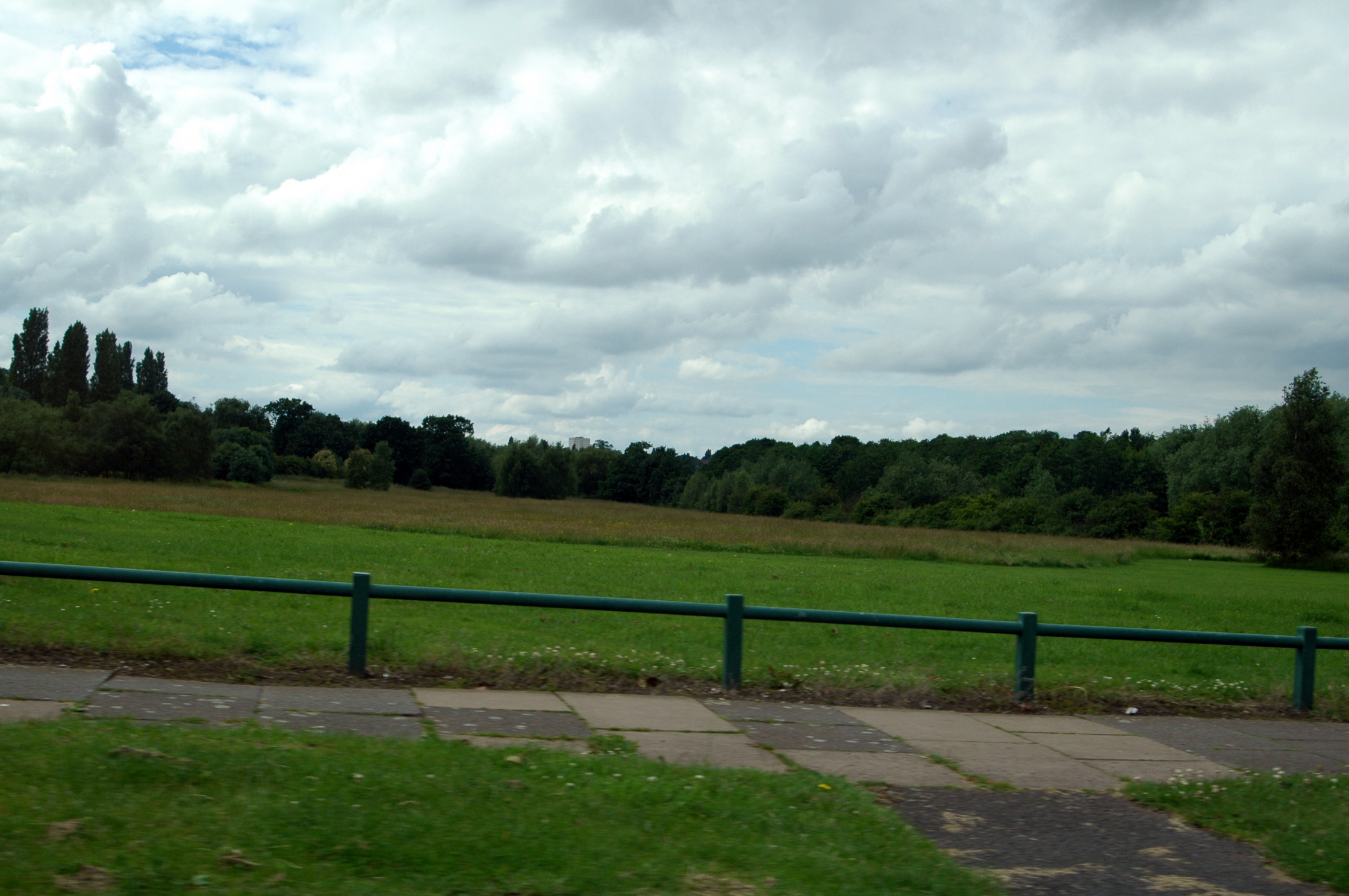
Pype Hayes Park as viewed from Eachelhurst Road.

Pype Hayes is a modern housing estate area and council ward in the east of the Erdington district of Birmingham. It was within the Tyburn ward until 2018. Covering the postcodes of B24 and B76.

== Etymology ==
The name of the area derives from a major landowner in Erdington called Henry de Pipe. On this land he built a house which later developed into Pype Hayes Hall.

== History ==
Pype Hayes developed mainly during the 20th century as a result of the expansion of Erdington northwards towards the Chester Road.

The Chester Road follows the line of the ancient drover's road called the Welsh Road. It developed during the 17th century as a major thoroughfare through Birmingham. Stage coaches used the road and it developed a reputation as a haven for highwaymen.

All the land in Pype Hayes was owned as part of an estate with Pype Hayes Hall at its centre. This was a prominent hall in the area and the nearest settlement was Holifast Grange to the north-west. The construction of the Birmingham and Fazeley Canal in the south of Erdington prompted the establishment of industries near Tyburn, which is close to Pype Hayes. However, Pype Hayes remained unaffected by the industry.

In the 20th century, Pype Hayes became the focus of residential developments for the expanding Erdington area. Also, the public wanted houses so that they could live near their workplaces at Tyburn. Eachelhurst Road was selected as a main housing development location. As Eachelhurst Road was on the boundary of Pype Hayes, the area remained relatively untouched. The houses were constructed between World War I and World War II and were of a semi-detached style. They were constructed of concrete and steel.

The areas surrounding Pype Hayes developed quickly. Walmley in Sutton Coldfield expanded massively and Castle Vale to the south-east became a major industrial area with the construction of a large aerodrome. The landowners lost power within the area and so the Chester Road became developed. During the war, Pype Hayes was bombed, however, this was mainly haphazard bombing aimed at Erdington. Walmley Ash, nearby to Pype Hayes, witnessed 70-80 bombs being dropped on the area in just one night.

Pype Hayes was extensively developed for council housing in the 1920s, as Birmingham City Council had recently started a huge process of rehousing people from inner city slums. More than 1,300 homes were built at Pype Hayes on land between Chester Road and Tyburn Road, with concrete walls and steel subframes – typical Dunlop Boswell style.

The first school opened on the estate in 1928 – Paget Council School, which had capacity for 824 pupils aged 5–15 years. Gunter Road Council School was added in 1930 for 432 children aged 5–11 years, with wooden huts being added in 1930 and even the hall of St Mary's Church being used as an annex from 1952 to 1954 to cope with increased pupil numbers.

By the 1980s, most of the houses at Pype Hayes were plagued with "concrete cancer" – a structural defect which renders buildings beyond repair. As with many large council housing estates, car crime, drugs, burglaries and "hooligan" behaviour were becoming a widespread problem. Also demolished was the Norton public house, which was replaced by a supermarket.

It was soon decided that the defective homes all had to be demolished, and in 1992 the Pype Hayes Regeneration Programme began.

Several tower blocks were built on Pype Hayes during the 1960s, as part of further rehousing from inner city slums, but these homes were no better than the older ones in the area, despite being some 40 years newer. They too would have to be demolished.

On 7 July 2005 the council approved the demolition of properties 189-235 Pype Hayes Road, which were built by Dunlop Boswell. Demolition cost an estimated £60,000. The last houses to be were demolished were around 2010–2011. The twelfth and final phase of the regeneration was approved by the Cabinet on 27 October 2003. The successful tender submission by Barratt Homes and Prime Focus was then approved in 2002. Most of the properties in Pype Hayes were demolished, with the exception of Sorrel House which was retained and refurbished, and were replaced with a modern housing development. The regeneration of Pype Hayes continues with Persimmon Homes completing the final phase in 2009, ending the estate's regeneration process which had lasted 17 years.

== Notable Places ==
Pype Hayes Hall remains today and was auctioned by Birmingham City Council in February 2012. It is now in private hands. The hall was sold in November 2013 for £25,000 to private investors with plans to create a hotel and leisure complex. As of November 2019 the hall still lies derelict with no development. Surrounding the hall is a 100-acre (0.40 km^{2}) park called Pype Hayes Park which hosts a funfair and used to be the site for a large City Council funded bonfire and firework display to celebrate Guy Fawkes Night. This has not been held for a number of years due to cuts in City resources. Adjacent to the park is Pype Hayes Golf Course, which was opened in 1933. The two are separated by Plants Brook which flows beneath the Eachelhurst Road and drains into the River Tame after flowing underneath Castle Vale.

The parish church for Pype Hayes is St Mary's Church, which opened in 1929.

== The Bagot Arms ==
At the Eachelhurst Road – Chester Road junction was a pub called The Bagot Arms. This closed in 2019 and a cannabis farm was later discovered in the empty lot. June 2021 saw an alleged arson attack followed by another in August 2021 which resulted in the demolition of the remaining parts of the building in late 2023, with the site now sitting empty to date, although plans for the site to be converted into 51 apartments were approved in 2022.

== Transport ==
The A38 passes through the area. The road is used by several National Express West Midlands services which travel through Stockland Green to the Aston Expressway, or travel in opposite directions into Sutton Coldfield, Erdington, Walmley and Castle Bromwich.

There are no rail facilities in the area, however, further up the Chester Road is Chester Road railway station on the Cross-City Line. Also in close proximity are Erdington and Water Orton railway stations.

Mayor of the West Midlands Andy Street included a tram stop in Pype Hayes, as well as one in the nearby Minworth, and the reopening of the abandoned Penns railway station as Walmley, which would serve as the closest railway station for the eastern portion of Pype Hayes.

== Election results ==
The Birmingham City Council ward of Pype Hayes was created from the Tyburn Ward for the 2018 election.

Danny Carter of Reform UK is the current councillor for the ward of Pype Hayes.

2022 Birmingham City Council Election
Party	Candidate	Votes	%
Labour	Basharat Mahmood	911	47.7
Conservative	Clifton Welch	819	42.9
Green	Robert Deamer	105	5.5
Liberal Democrats	Gerald Watts	45	2.4
TUSC	Bill Murray	28	1.5
Majority		92	4.8
Turnout		1,908	25.7
Labour hold			

2018 Birmingham City Council Election
Party	Candidate	Votes	%
Labour	Mike Sharpe	851	45.9
Conservative	Clifton Welch	835	45.1
Liberal Democrats	Ann Holtom	109	5.9
Green	John Bentley	58	3.1
Majority		16	0.8
Turnout		1,856	?
Labour gain (new seat)			
