= Bleak Hill Park =

Public park

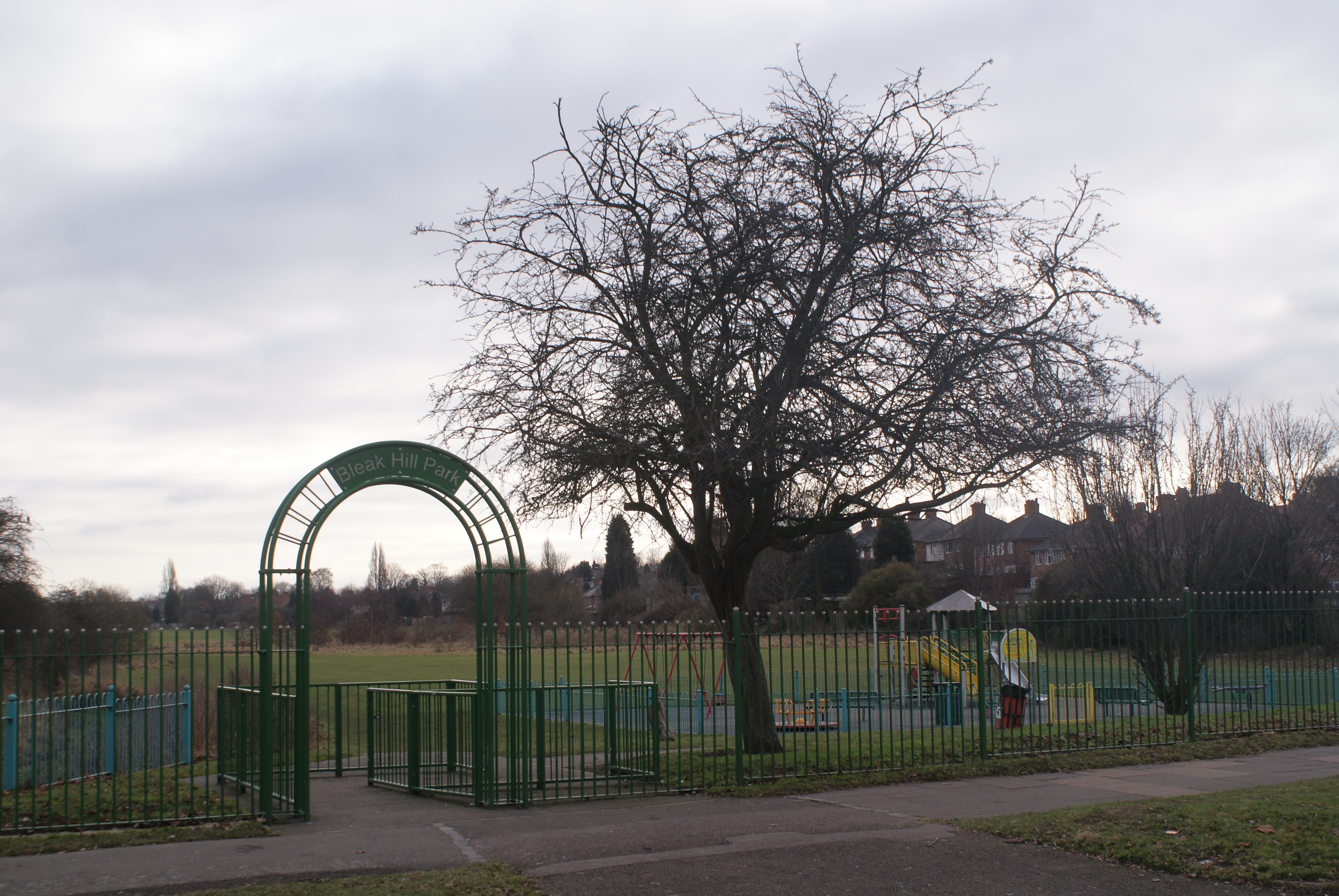
- Streetly Road entrance to the park

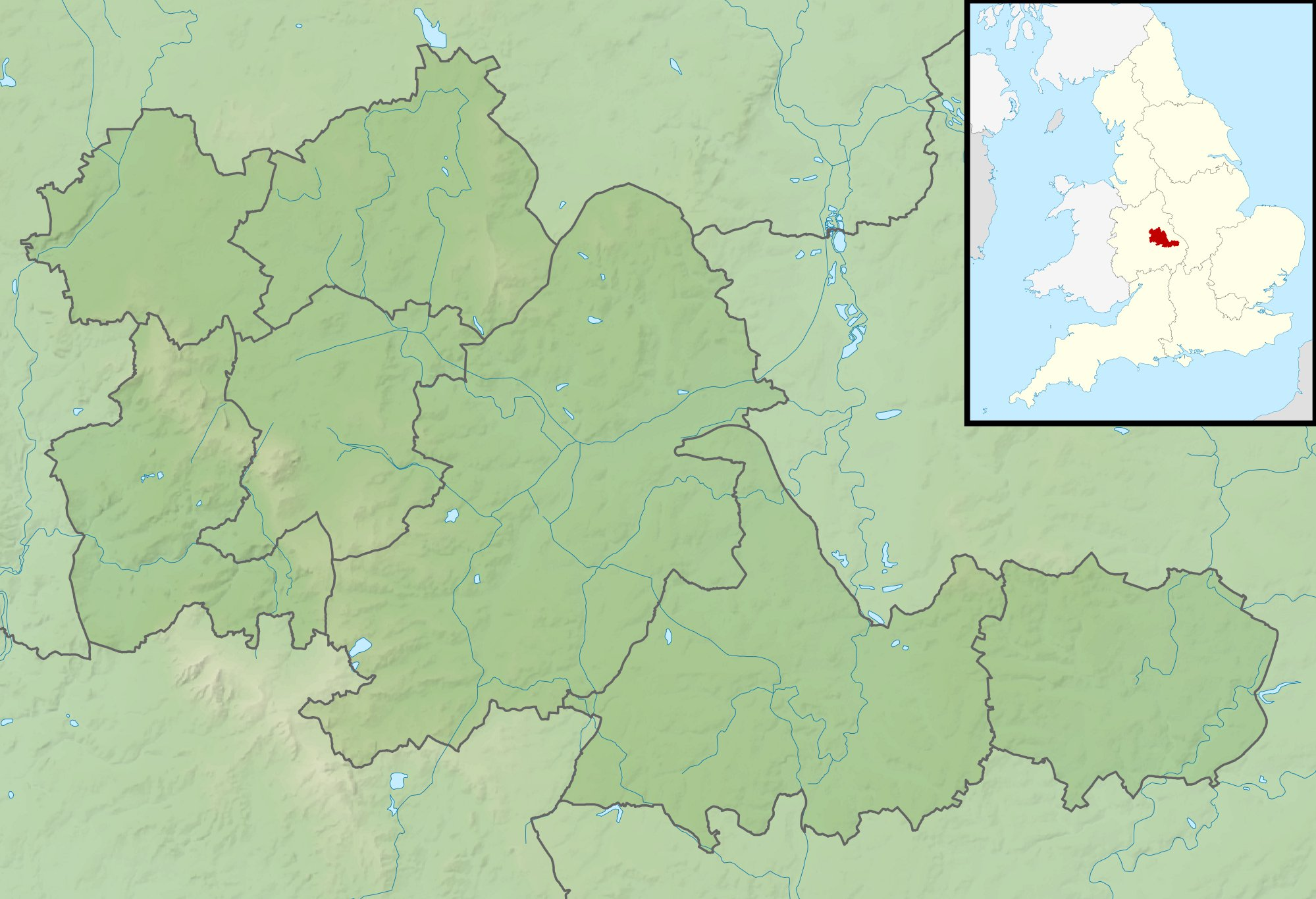
- Location within West Midlands county
- Interactive map of Bleak Hill Park
- Type: Public park
- Location: Erdington, Birmingham, UK
- Coordinates: 52.5290°N 1.8531°W
- Area: 31.5 acres (0.127 km^{2})
- Operator: Birmingham City Council

Bleak Hill Park (formerly known as Short Heath Recreational Ground) is a public park in Erdington, Birmingham, UK. It is identified by Birmingham City Council as a "green corridor".

== History ==
The park is named after the topographical name of the nearby area; referring to either "bleak hills" or "black hills". Like the origin of Blakesley Hall in Yardley, three Old English words could provide the root of the word "Bleak" – one meaning "black", one meaning "to shine", and one meaning "shining, pale, or bleak".

The area was first recorded as Blakhilles in 1461.

=== Renovation ===
In 2008, the park underwent a £100,000 transformation to remove graffiti and litter and to install sports pitches.
