= Erdington =

Suburb of Birmingham, England

Coordinates: 52.523611°N 1.837778°W

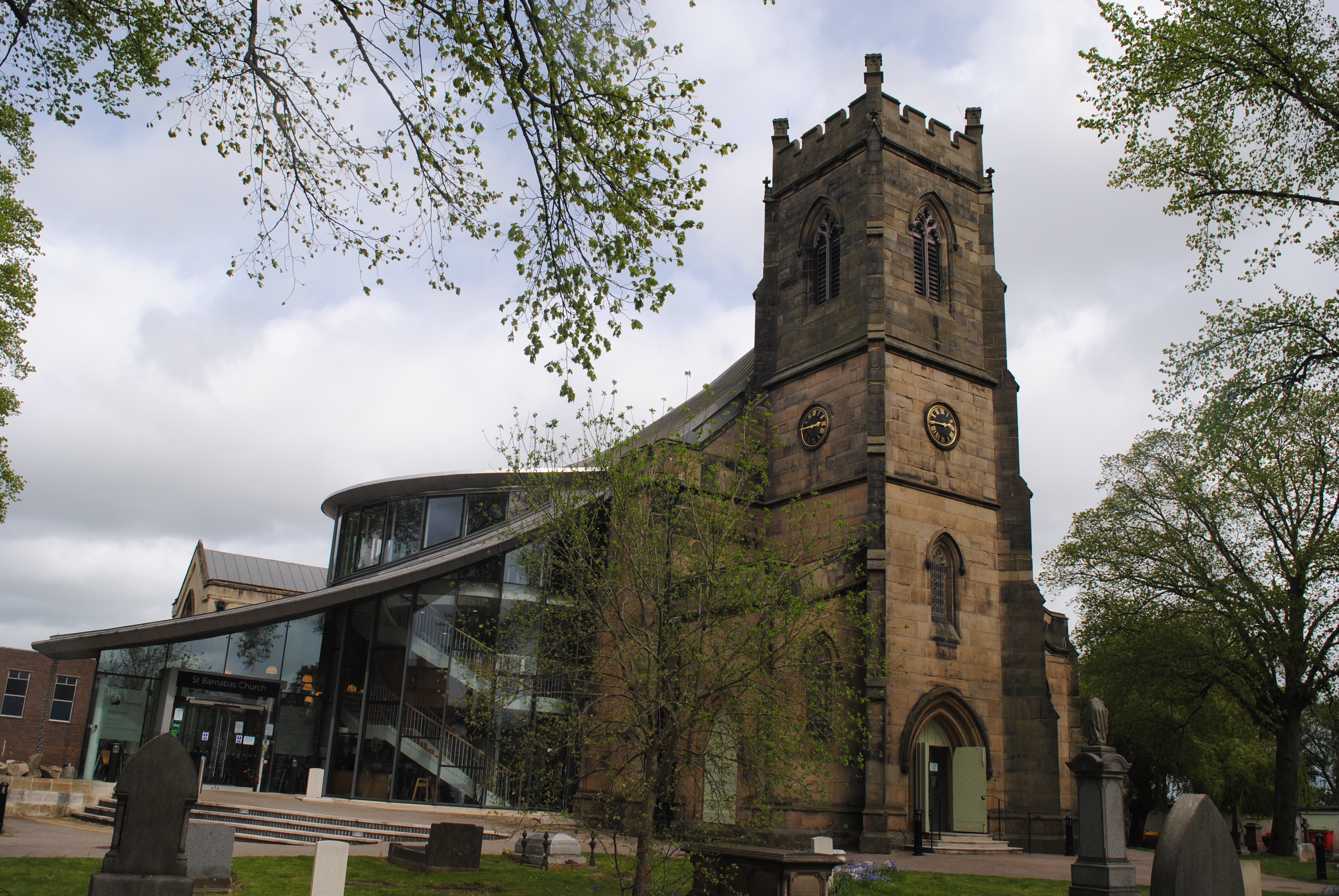
- St Barnabas' Church, Erdington

- Location within the West Midlands
- Population: 22,828 (2011Ward)
  - Density: 4,910 per km²
- OS grid reference: SP111919
- Metropolitan borough: Birmingham
- Metropolitan county: West Midlands
- Region: West Midlands
- Country: England
- Sovereign state: United Kingdom
- Post town: BIRMINGHAM
- Postcode district: B23, B24
- Dialling code: 0121
- Police: West Midlands
- Fire: West Midlands
- Ambulance: West Midlands
- UK Parliament: Birmingham Erdington

Erdington is a suburb and ward of Birmingham, in the county of the West Midlands, England. It is located 5 miles (8 km) northeast of central Birmingham, bordering Sutton Coldfield. Erdington saw significant development in the Victorian era after the railway arrived from Birmingham in 1862. It was incorporated into Birmingham in 1912. The 2021 census shows the population of the ward to be 21,550.

== History ==
=== Erdington Manor ===
Erdington Hall, a manor house, was protected on three sides by a double moat and on the fourth by the River Tame. It had developed from a small fortified homestead constructed by an Anglo-Saxon named Eardwulf in the area of Bromford. Demolished in the 17th century, it stood on a hill at the junction of what is now Wheelwright Road and Tyburn Road. The double moat was drained in the 18th century by Sir Charles Holte. Until 1912 another building stood, but this was demolished for the construction of the Tyburn Road, though a small section remained until World War I.

Other moated properties included one at Fern Road, one at the junction of Moor End Lane and Berkswell Road, and another that surrounded a large farm called Pipe Orchard, the site of which can be seen in the Erdington Grammar School playing fields.

=== Middle Ages ===
Erdington developed as a village as a result of settlers travelling up the course of the River Tame from Tamworth in the 9th century. The settlements of Minworth and Curdworth were also established. It is believed that the Roman track 'Ridgeway', now Chester Road, was another route for settlers, since the early nucleus of the village which was a very short distance from the path.

At the time of the Norman Conquest the Earls of Mercia had possession of the village: Edwin, grandson of Lady Godiva, owned the property. He tried to resist the Normans' attempts to gain possession of Erdington, but he was executed in 1071. The earldom then passed to William I who placed the manor and village in the possession of William Fitz-Ansculf, a powerful Norman baron who lived at Dudley Castle. He then gave the manor to Peter de Erdington.

Erdington was mentioned in the Domesday Book under the name Hardintone and was under the possession of Peter. It had arable land for six ploughs, a mill and 5 acres (2.0 ha) of meadows and woodland. It was valued at 30 shillings and was one mile (1.6 km) in length and half a mile in breadth.

As Erdington was near Sutton Forest, the Normans imposed strict laws on the village forbidding the hunting of wild animals and the keeping of sheep. Tenants were permitted an allowance of timber from the forest, but with limitations to protect royal game. Erdington remained within the precincts of Sutton Forest until 1126, when Henry I exchanged the Manor of Sutton, with forest, for two manors in Rutland belonging to Roger, Earl of Warwick. The forest became a chase and the woodland laws were relaxed.

The mill mentioned in the Domesday Book was located in Bromford, close to the manor house at a loop in the river, where a straight channel was cut to facilitate the milling of corn. The mill was owned by the lord of the manor and the tenants were obliged to grind their corn there. Erdington was connected to Bromford via Bromford Lane, which still exists today in the middle of a 1960s council estate.

In the 15th century, a chapel was built at the side of the manor house for the residents of Erdington. However, attendance was low and the chapel fell into decay. The residents were then urged to travel to the parish church in Aston; however, again the attendance was low. A south aisle was therefore added to the church and became known as the Erdington chantry.

The Black plague affected Erdington severely as indicated in the 14th century local records. Henry de Pipe, owner of the Manor of Pipe (now Pype Hayes Hall), lost his wife and all but one child. His second wife, Maud, was the daughter of George de Castello of Castle Bromwich. However he soon discovered that she was pregnant with a child of another man, and he then died.

=== Tudor period ===
Around the 1500s the Gravelly Hill area began to become mentioned in documents. John Leland described the area as "by sandy ground, better wooded than fertile of wheat ... the soil is sandy and good for conyes." Thus there were many rabbits (conyes) and it is known that it remained as a rabbit warren for a while, as it was deemed unsuitable for cultivation. At the foot of Gravelly Hill was the River Tame, which was spanned by Salford Bridge. Salford Bridge was first mentioned as Shrafford Brugge during the reign of Henry III. It was originally a footbridge; however in 1810 it was improved to allow the crossing of vehicles. The word Shrafford was of Saxon origin, meaning "the ford by the caves". These caves were cavities in the nearby Copeley escarpment. The caves were artificially enlarged, and survived World War II. During the war, they were used as air raid shelters. After the war they were completely destroyed for the construction of the Gravelly Hill Interchange.

During the 16th and 17th centuries, new families lived at Erdington Hall. The Dymocks moved in: they were a prominent family, including several knights. However their strict manorial laws made them unpopular amongst the residents of Erdington.

=== English Civil War ===
As the English Civil War erupted, Erdington was expanding rapidly through the purchase of land for agricultural purposes. In 1643, Birmingham was plundered by the Royalists. After his victory in Birmingham, Prince Rupert passed through Erdington and Sutton Coldfield with his troops on their way to Lichfield.

=== 18th and 19th centuries ===
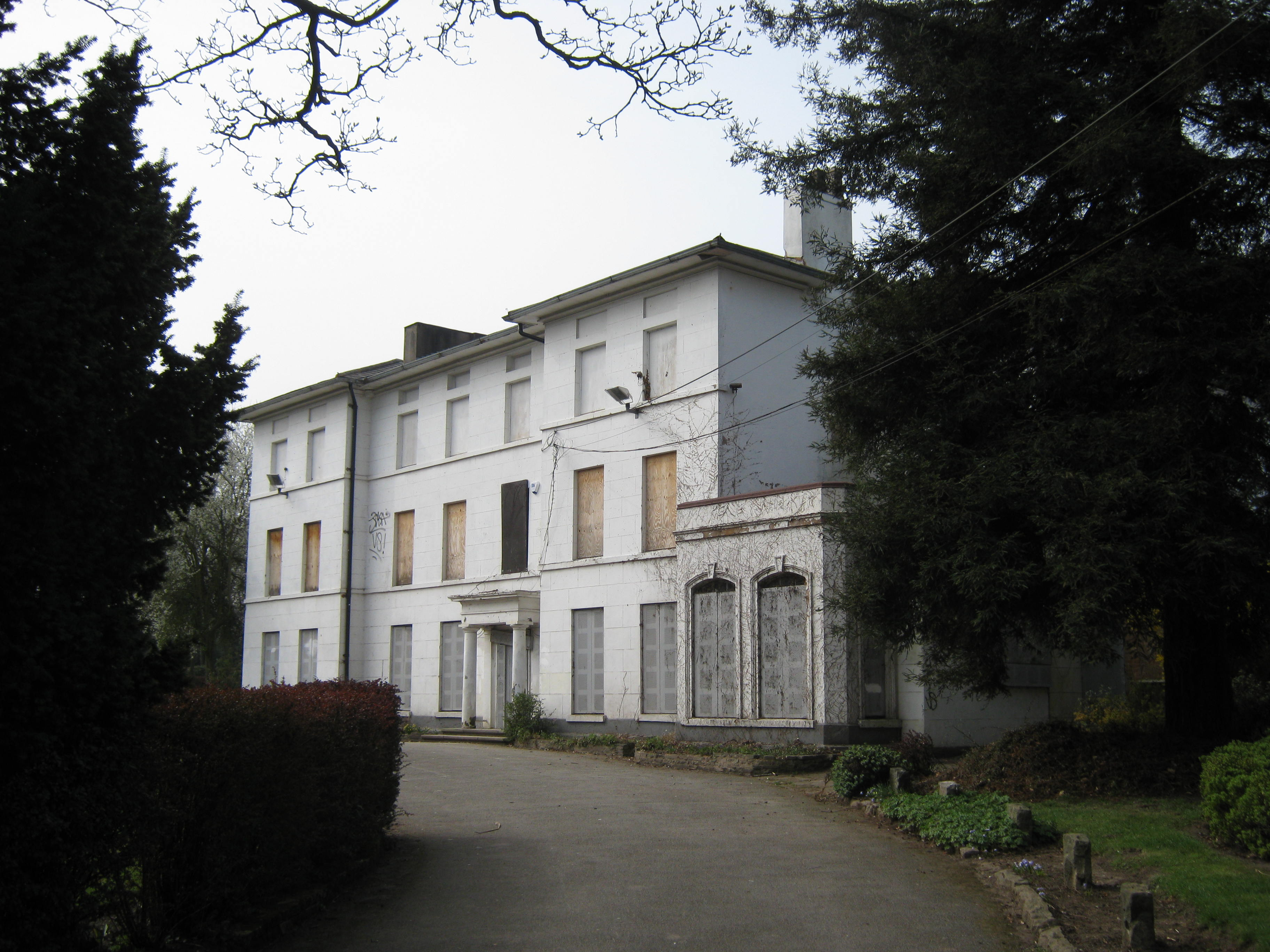
Rookery House

In 1759, a turnpike act was passed for the Chester Road and another act was passed in 1807 for a road that passed through Erdington village from Birmingham. This resulted in Erdington being a stop-off location for stage coaches which passed along the Chester Road to Chester from London. In 1783, the Birmingham-Fazeley Canal was completed. It passed along the southern boundary of Erdington at Tyburn. Planning requests included that the canal should not pass within 500 metres of Pype Hayes Hall.

By the mid-1700s, Erdington had a population of under 700 and within its boundaries were 52 roads, one forge, 40 farms, 96 cottages, two smithies and a shop. By 1832, it had a population of 2,000.

Erdington has had historic ties with both Castle Bromwich and Water Orton through administration, governance and land ownership whilst being part of Aston parish. Erdington was formerly a chapelry in the parish of Aston, In 1894 Erdington broke from Aston to become an urban district. Administrative offices were established at Rookery House on Kingsbury Road, which now forms part of Rookery Park. On 31 December 1894 Erdington became a separate civil parish, On 9 November 1911, the urban district Erdington and that of Aston Manor were absorbed into the County Borough of Birmingham. On 1 April 1912 the parish was abolished and merged with Birmingham. At the 1911 census (the last before the abolition of the civil parish), Erdington had a population of 32,331.

Erdington shopping centre formed the core of the area with most of the older housing being located close to it. The railway alongside also attracted the development of many Victorian and Edwardian houses.

=== Highcroft Hospital ===
Highcroft Hospital was a former Poor Law institution, and then a psychiatric hospital. There was a social stigma to being treated there. Other large psychiatric institutions in Birmingham have been broken up. Some of the old Highcroft Hospital grounds have been used for new housing. The main hospital building has been renovated into luxury apartments and has been named Highcroft Hall. Highcroft Hall was built between 1869 and 1871 by Victorian architect Yeoville Thomason.

The building, sanctioned by the Poor Law Board, was originally a workhouse providing housing to paupers, idiots, tramps, seniles, lunatics and imbeciles (terms used at the time with distinctive definitions).

The building was originally named the Aston Union Workhouse, but was renamed over the years as Erdington House (1912 – following the City boundary changes), and then Highcroft Hall Hospital (1942); and was more commonly referred to in later years as just Highcroft Hospital.

Over the years, the hospital has generally provided care for the mentally ill. In 1994, the hospital became part of the Northern Birmingham Mental Health NHS Trust. During the following two years, the facilities in the old buildings were gradually rehoused in more modern units nearby and in 1996, the main building was declared closed. The main house was derelict for the next eight years, before being refurbished by property developers between 2004 and 2006.

=== Lyndhurst estate ===
On the Sutton Road, a number of houses were demolished in 1957 for the construction of the Lyndhurst Estate. Number 44 was retained as it was an old building considered to be of interest. The demolished houses were detached post-1840 Victorian villas. Constructed on the site were six tower blocks and numerous low rise maisonettes. The tallest of these, Harlech Tower, was 16 storeys and at the time it was the tallest tower block in Birmingham, though many taller blocks were later built. In 1961, the estate won the Civic Award for Housing for the retention of the original trees from the villas and the architectural qualities of the tower blocks which included an exposed concrete frame, a sweeping staircase and a false upper storey to hide the laundry facilities on the roof.

The Lyndhurst estate has since been redeveloped. The low rise maisonettes were demolished along with Harlech and Burcombe Towers. Modern residential properties were built on the site and the remaining tower blocks refurbished.

=== Pitts Farm estate ===
Pitts Farm estate is off Chester Rd in some places bordering Pype Hayes Park. There are plans to develop and improve the area.

== Toponymy ==
Though referred to as Hardintone in the Domesday Book, it is widely accepted that the name comes from a reference to a fortified homestead established by Eardwulf in Anglo Saxon times, with 'ton' or 'tun' being an Anglo-Saxon suffix for a settlement of that period. This homestead developed into a large house in the area of Bromford and became Erdington Hall.

However the name "Yenton" also applies to the possible corruption of "Yerdington", an enclosure, which could apply to a moated homestead.

== Features ==
Erdington's history is documented well through its buildings. One of the most well-known features in the area is Spaghetti Junction, situated on the southern edge of the district and on the border of Aston and Gravelly Hill. As well as being a road interchange, two railway lines, three canals, and two rivers also converge on that location. Britain's longest bridge, Bromford Viaduct starts here, carrying the M6 to Junction 5, Castle Bromwich. It has long been a historic crossing point in Birmingham, with the incorporation of Salford Bridge, which was first mentioned in a deed in 1490, although a bridge is believed to have been at this location since 1290.

=== Fort Dunlop ===
Nearby is Fort Dunlop, former home of Dunlop Rubber, a relic of Erdington's industrial past. At its peak, it employed 10,000 people but its industrial usage has declined since, with Dunlop maintaining only a small presence in the area. The factory closed in September 2014.

The main building was redeveloped from 2005 to 2006 into office and retail space by Urban Splash. The area surrounding Fort Dunlop is used by logistics companies and also features showrooms operated by several car manufacturers, including Birmingham's only Lamborghini dealership.

=== Shopping ===
Fort Dunlop lends its name to the nearby The Fort Shopping Park, constructed on reclaimed land by the Birmingham Heartlands Development Corporation in 1996.

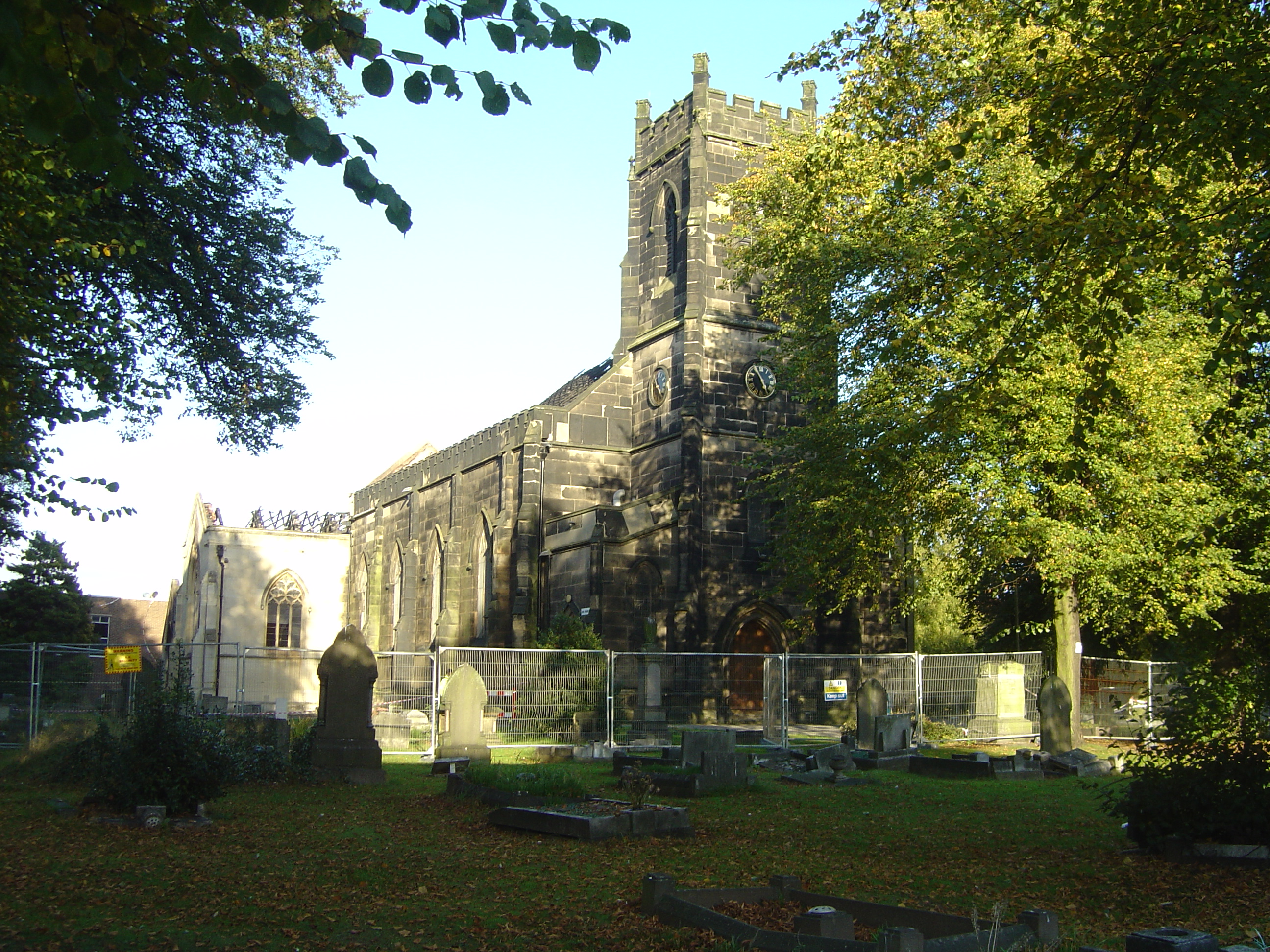
The Parish Church, following the fire

Erdington has a distinct concentration of retail space, known as Erdington town centre or Erdington village, the main focus of which is Erdington High Street. There is also a market located on Barnabas Road and another market, Wilton Market, between Sutton New Road and the High Street, next to Wilton Market is Swannies which is intermediate between a market and a shopping centre. Opposite Wilton Market and Swannies on the High Street is a Cooperative Store which has been there since at least the 1950s and is the largest Supermarket in the town centre. Erdington town centre is now a Business Improvement District.

=== Other features in central Erdington ===
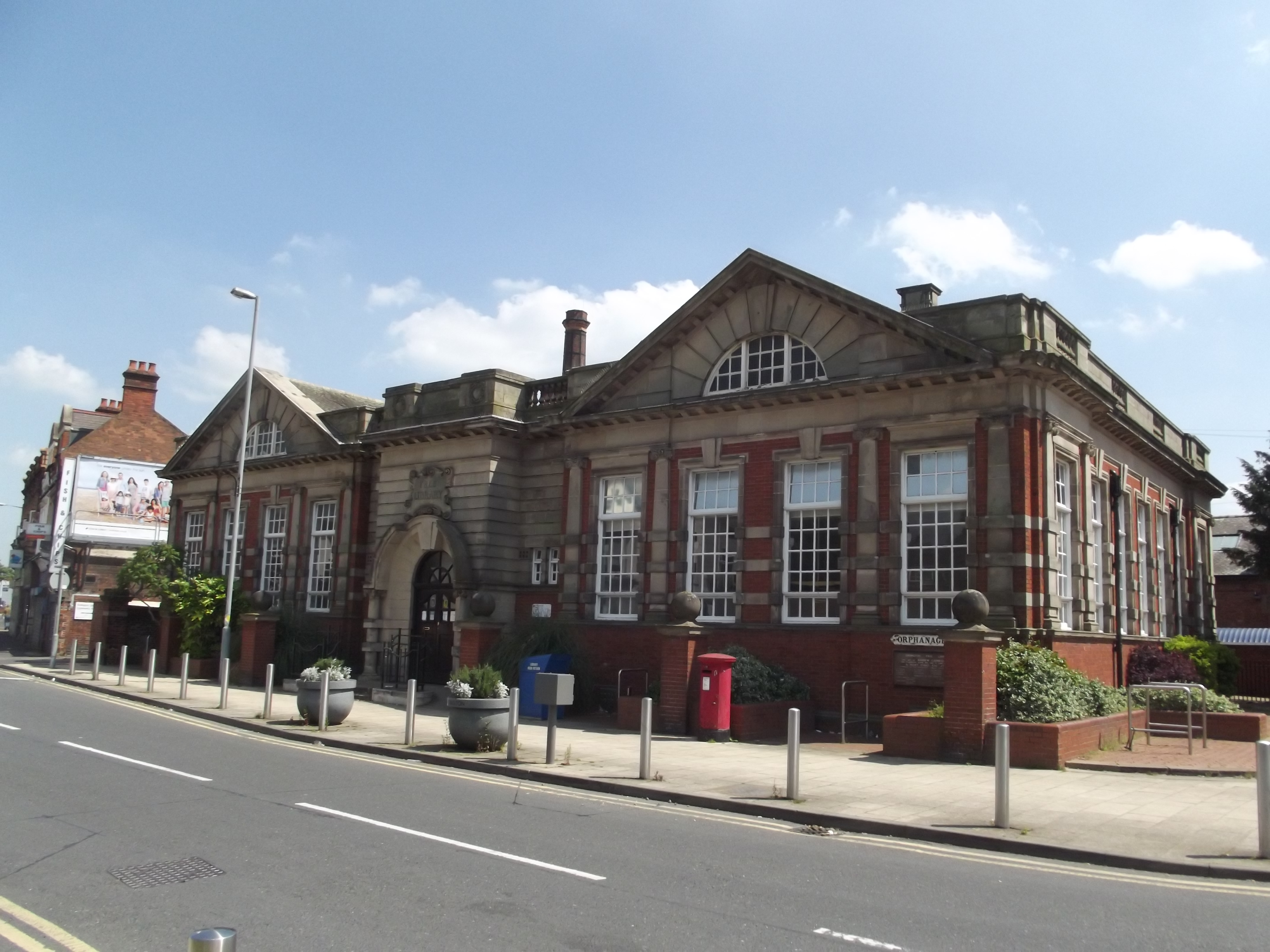
Erdington Library

Also on the High Street is Erdington Parish Church, and nearby on Sutton Road is The Abbey Church. The original Abbey building forms part of the neighbouring Highclare School. The Parish Church was severely damaged by fire on the morning of 4 October 2007. It has now been extensively repaired and modernised. Also nearby, on Mason Road, is Erdington Swimming Baths which were constructed by the Birmingham Baths Committee, this was a complex including Saunas and a fitness centre as well as a swimming pool, but has now been replaced by a new leisure Centre and Baths on Orphanage Road nearby. Erdington Library, Opened in 1907 as a Carnegie library, is a public library operated by Birmingham City Council. It is the meeting place of the Erdington Historical Society on the second Monday of every month.

=== Other features in Erdington ===
Schools

Josiah Mason Campus, a campus forming Birmingham Metropolitan College, was formerly a further education college by the name of Josiah Mason College that merged with Sutton Coldfield College in 2006. Before the site was taken over by Josiah Mason, there were two grammar schools and a further secondary school. The two grammar schools were Marsh Hill Boys School and Marsh Hill Girls Schools (the schools were formally known as Grammar Technical Schools); the third school on the site was Stockland Green Bilateral School.

Other secondary schools in Erdington were: Erdington Girls Grammar School, Jaffray School, Moor End School and St Edmond Campion School which were "fed" by children leaving Primary Schools at Erdington Hall and others(list needs completing).

Community Facilities

To the north of Erdington, within the area of Pype Hayes on the border with Walmley, is Pype Hayes Park and Pype Hayes Hall, the former home of the Bagot family. A smaller park in the area is Sorrel Park.

The Old Green Man on Bromford Lane (now known as the Lad in the Lane) is one of the oldest public houses in Birmingham. Another, is the 'Charlie Hall', in Ward End. It's named after the Birmingham character actor who starred in many Laurel and Hardy films.

In 2017, a brand new sports facility opened to the public. It cost £7.5 million and provided the people of Erdington with a 25-metre swimming pool, a teaching pool, a 70-station gym and a community room/studio space. Fitness classes, children holiday activity area and birthday parties are also hosted there.

=== Hospitals ===
Erdington is served by the Good Hope Hospital in neighbouring Sutton Coldfield. Erdington is also served by the Birmingham Hospice and by Northcroft Hospital built on the edge of the site of the former Highcroft Hospital.

== Geography ==
Erdington ward borders the Birmingham City Council wards of Sutton Vesey, Sutton Wylde Green, Pype Hayes, Gravelly Hill, Stockland Green and Perry Common. It is approximately four miles (6 kilometres) north east of Birmingham City Centre. Birmingham Erdington parliamentary constituency has wider boundaries.

Brookvale Park Lake and surrounding land is a park that was formally a drinking water reservoir until the steadily encroaching city made the water unfit for human consumption. It was briefly converted into an outdoor pool until that was also abandoned after health and safety concerns.

Two tornadoes touched down in Birmingham on 23 November 1981 as part of the record-breaking nationwide tornado outbreak on that day. The first tornado, rated as an F1/T2 tornado, touched down in Erdington at about 14:00 local time, causing some damage across the northern suburbs of Birmingham.

== Demographics ==
At the time of the 2001 Population Census there were 22,626 people living in Erdington. The area where Chester Road crosses Birmingham Road and Sutton Road is called "The Yenton". The area had a population density of 50.7 people per hectare and the ward covers an area of 446.2 hectares. Erdington had a slightly higher proportion of females, at 52%, to males. This followed the city trend as 51.6% of the population of Birmingham are females. 98.6% of the population of Erdington lived in households whilst the remaining 1.4% lived in communal establishments. This is 0.3% above and 0.3% below the city average, respectively. There were a total of 10,547 households in Erdington, producing an average of 2.2 persons per household. This is below the city average of 2.5 and national average of 2.4. 63.4% of the households are owner occupied, above the city average of 60.4%. The local authority rented out 19.2% of the population. 5.8% of the households were rented from housing associations and 8% were rented privately. 459 of households were vacant, which accounted for 4.4% of the total number of houses in Erdington. The most common housing type was semi-detached properties, whilst purpose built blocks of flats were the second most common.

The age patterns of Erdington are very similar to that of the England. 29.7% of the residents were in the 25–44 age bracket, above the city average of 28.3% and the nationwide average of 29.3%. 19% of residents were of a pensionable age, above the city average of 16.7%. 60% of the population were of a working age (16–65 years of age), above the city average of 59.8% but below the national average of 61.5%.

Some 8.9% of the population were born outside of the country, below the city average of 16.5% and national average of 9.3%. 89% of the population are white, well above the city average of 70.4% and just below the national average of 90.9%. Black ethnic groups were the second largest in Erdington, representing 3.9% of the population. 3.8% were from Asian ethnic groups and 2.8% were from mixed ethnic backgrounds. The remaining 0.5% were from Chinese and other ethnic groups. More specifically, the British White ethnic group represented 81.7% of the population and the Irish White represented 6%. 3.2% of the population were of Black Caribbean descent and 1.8% were of Indian descent.

71% of the population of Erdington stated themselves as Christians, the same figure for the rest of the country although higher than the Birmingham average of 59.1%. 14.9% of the population stated that they were of no religion. Muslims represented 2.2% of the population, below the Birmingham average of 14.3% and the lowest number in the city (together with the Sutton Coldfield wards).

Erdington had an unemployment rate of 8.1%, below the city rate of 9.5% but above the national average of 5%. 65.5% of the population were economically active. Of the economically inactive, 36.2% were retired and 10.7% were students. 33% were long term unemployed and 9.9% had never worked. Of the economically active, 17.5% worked in the Manufacturing sector. The largest employers in the area were the Education Department of Birmingham City Council, Colliers Peugeot dealers and Cincinnati Machine (UK) Ltd. all of which employed 200 people between them.

Erdington's best known resident was Josiah Mason, the philanthropist whose bust now stands at the centre of the roundabout at the junction of Chester Road and Orphanage Road, which leads on to Berwood Farm Road and Welwyndale Rd, so named because he founded an Orphanage there in 1860.

== Transport ==
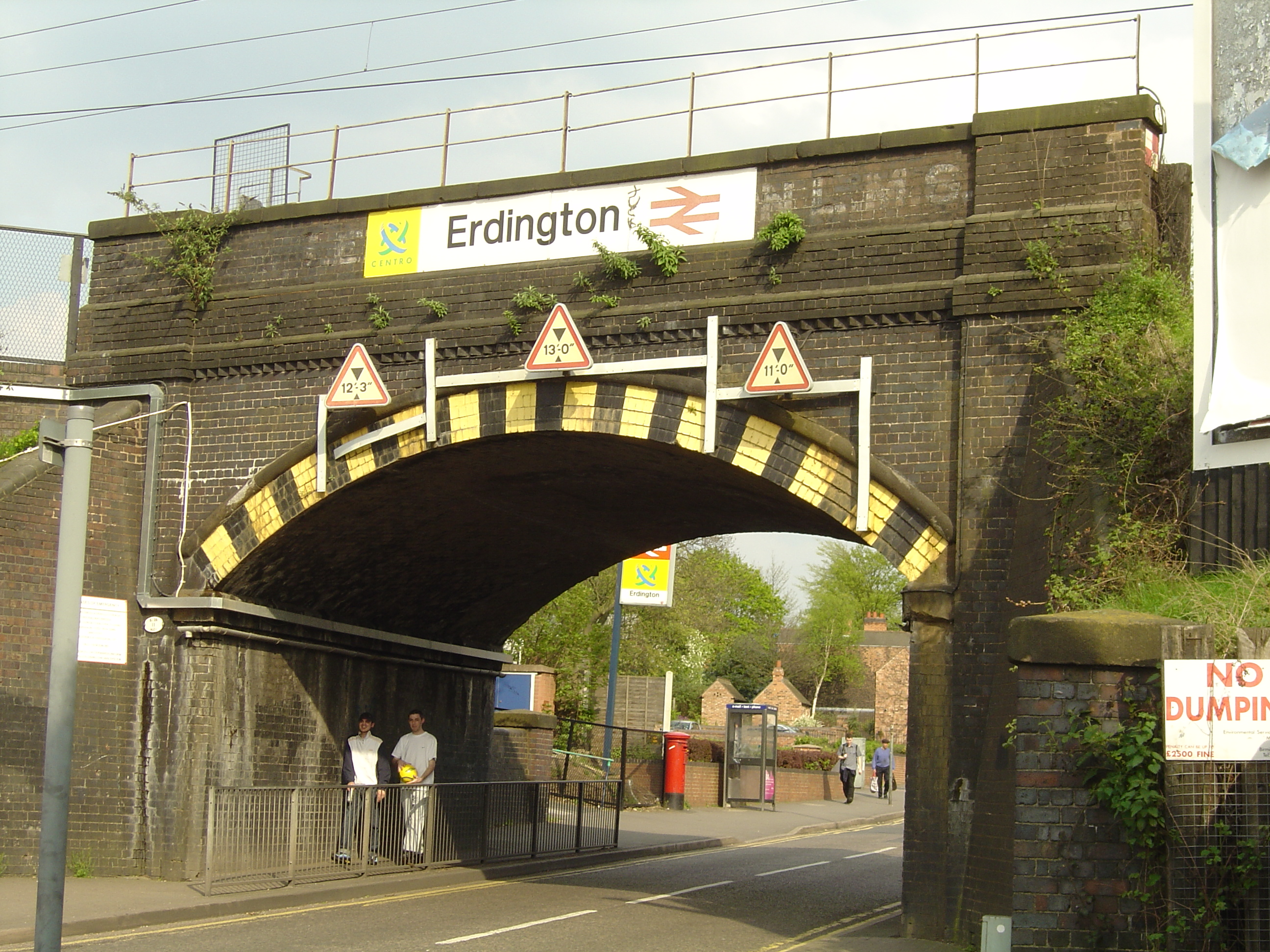
The bridge at Erdington, showing the old LMS lettering.

Erdington railway station lies on the Cross-City Line, which runs northwards to Lichfield and southwards to Redditch via Birmingham New Street. The line and station opened in 1862. Erdington is also served by the two adjacent stations on the line, Gravelly Hill, which was also opened in 1862, and Chester Road, which opened in 1863.

Important roads that access the area include A38 (Birmingham to Derby road), A5127 (Gravelly Hill) and the A47 Spine Road. The M6 motorway forms the southern border of the district, with connections at Junction 6 (Gravelly Hill Interchange). There is a well-established network of bus routes through Erdington with connections to Birmingham city centre and Sutton Coldfield, the majority of which are operated by National Express West Midlands.

In the southern area of the district is the Birmingham Fazeley Canal which helped develop that area as a major employment sector. The River Tame added to this, and with the introduction of the Birmingham and Derby Junction Railway the area became a prominent industrial area.

== Politics ==
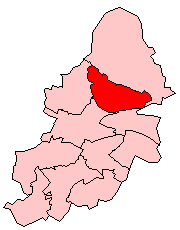
Erdington constituency shown within Birmingham.

Erdington has long been represented by the Labour Party. There was much surprise when Conservative Robert Alden won a seat in Erdington ward de-seating the Labour candidate Susannah McCory in 2006. Again in 2007, McCory lost to the Conservatives, this time to Gareth Compton who replaced the retiring long serving Labour councillor Renee Spector. The other seat in the ward was won, again by the Conservatives, by Bob Beauchamp, an Erdington garage owner.

Since a boundary review implemented in 2018, the area is now covered by wards of Erdington, Pype Hayes, Gravelly Hill, Castle Vale, Stockland Green and Perry Common. The traditional town centre of Erdington is covered largely by the new smaller Erdington ward. As of 2026, the two councillors serving the ward are Robert Aldon and Gareth Moore, both Conservatives.

Birmingham Erdington is a constituency, which is currently represented by Paulette Hamilton of the Labour Party. Noted members of parliament have included Robin Corbett, Julius Silverman and Jack Dromey. Previously the areas Member of Parliament have included Sutton Coldfield to form a singular constituency. In addition to Erdington, the constituency includes the former (pre-2018) wards of Kingstanding, Stockland Green and Tyburn all outside the traditional Erdington boundaries.

== Culture and sport ==
It was formerly home to the famous rock music venue, Mothers (previously the Carlton Ballroom), which from 1968 until it closed in 1971 played host to bands such as Pink Floyd, Led Zeppelin and The Who. The resident band were Erdington locals The Moody Blues and the DJ was John Peel. The club was located opposite St Barnabas Church on the High Street above a furniture store. Other local Erdington artists included The Spencer Davis Group and Black Sabbath.

Erdington is home to Erdington United Football Club and Erdington RFC, a rugby union club with a strong focus on its youth development teams.

Erdington has two cricket teams: Highcroft and Great Barr Unity (formed in 2003 by the merger of Highcroft CC and Great Barr CC) and Erdington Court. It also has a Gaelic football and hurling team, Erin Go Bragh and a successful non-league football Club, Paget Rangers FC. It is also home to Birmingham's American football team, the Birmingham Bulls.

== Notable people ==
- Gabriel Agbonlahor, Aston Villa F.C. striker was born near Erdington.
- Ronald Baynham, (footballer), (1929–2024). Played 388 games for Luton Town.
- Ronnie Bird (footballer), (1941–2005), Born and raised in Erdington, Bird was a professional footballer during the 60s and 70s, notably for Cardiff City, Bury & Crewe Alexandra.
- Corey Blackett-Taylor, born Erdington, Professional Footballer for Aston Villa, Walsall, Tranmere Rovers, Charlton Athletic, Derby County and Bolton Wanderers.
- Havergal Brian, the composer lived in Edwards Road in the early part of the 20th century.
- Ryan Cartwright, an actor who plays the character of Gary Bell in the SyFy science fiction drama Alphas.
- Paul Devlin (footballer) (born 1972), born and raised in Erdington. Played for Birmingham City, Sheffield United, Notts County and Watford.
- Leon Edwards, professional mixed martial artist and former welterweight UFC champion, lived in Erdington.
- Jo Enright, actress and comedian, known for Life's Too Short, The Job Lot and Trollied.
- Ann George, (1903–1989) actress, known for Crossroads: Kings Oak (1964), Crossroads: A Celebration (1971) and All Star Comedy Carnival (1972).
- Topsy Jane, (1938–2014), actress. She was best known for her roles in the films The Loneliness of the Long Distance Runner (film) (1962), Mix Me a Person (1962) and The Wind of Change, (1961). www.imdb.com/name/nm0417429/
- Victor Johnson, (1883–1951) was a track cycling racer who, in 1908, won a gold medal at the Olympics; became 'World Amateur Sprint Champion' in Germany and the 'British National Quarter-mile Champion'.
- Mike Kenning (footballer), played for Norwich City, Wolverhampton Wanderers, Charlton Athletic & Watford amongst others. Kenning played 412 professional games scoring 88 goals.
- John Lodge (musician) and Mike Pinder, founder members of the Moody Blues, were born and raised in Erdington.
- Jeff Lynne, singer, songwriter, record producer, and multi-instrumentalist who co-founded the rock band Electric Light Orchestra (ELO), was born in Pype Hayes, Erdington.
- Garfield Morgan, (1931–2009) actor. Living in Erdington he began acting with a local youth club drama group. He subsequently made hundreds of appearances in many shows but is best remembered for playing Detective Chief Inspector Frank Haskins in the crime series The Sweeney.
- John Oliver, the host of Last Week Tonight with John Oliver on HBO, was born in Erdington
- Gertrude Page, (1872–1922), writer, known for the novels Paddy the Next Best Thing (1923), Edge o' Beyond (1919) and Love in the Wilderness (1920).
- Harry Parkes (footballer, born 1920), (1920–2009), English footballer of the 1940s and 1950s for Aston Villa.
- Terence Rigby, (1937–2008), late RADA trained actor with a number of film and television credits to his name. In the 1970s he was well known as police dog-handler PC Snow in the long-running series Softly, Softly: Task Force.
- Martin Shaw, actor, best known for his roles in the television series The Professionals, The Chief, Doctor in the House, Judge John Deed and Inspector George Gently.
- Murray Walker, motorsport commentator lived on Holly Lane whilst on a Dunlop scholarship at Fort Dunlop
- Muff Winwood, musician with The Spencer Davis Group, brother of Steve.
