= Wilberforce (surname) =

Wilberforce is a surname, and may refer to:

- Barbara Wilberforce (1777–1847), wife of William Wilberforce the reformer
- Basil Wilberforce (1841–1916), Anglican priest, Archdeacon of Westminster, son of Samuel Wilberforce
- Ernest Wilberforce (1840–1907), Anglican bishop, son of Samuel Wilberforce
- Harold Wilberforce-Bell (1885–1956), British Indian Army lieutenant-general
- Henry Wilberforce (1807–1873), English Catholic convert, journalist and author, son of William Wilberforce the reformer
- Herbert Wilberforce (1864–1941), British tennis player
- Lionel Wilberforce (1861–1944), British physicist
- Marion Wilberforce (1902–1995), Scottish aviator
- Octavia Wilberforce (1888–1963), English physician
- Richard Wilberforce, Baron Wilberforce (1907–2003), British judge
- Robert Wilberforce (1802–1857), English cleric, Catholic convert and writer, son of William Wilberforce the reformer
- Robert Wilberforce (cricketer) (1910–1987), Australian cricketer
- Samuel Wilberforce (1805–1873), English bishop, son of William Wilberforce the reformer
- Susan Wilberforce, suspect in the 1987 murder of Simon Dale
- William Wilberforce (1759–1833), British politician, evangelical reformer and campaigner against the slave trade
- William Wilberforce (1798–1879), English lawyer and Member of Parliament, eldest son of William Wilberforce the reformer
