= Nathaniel Wells =

British planter and politician (1779–1852)

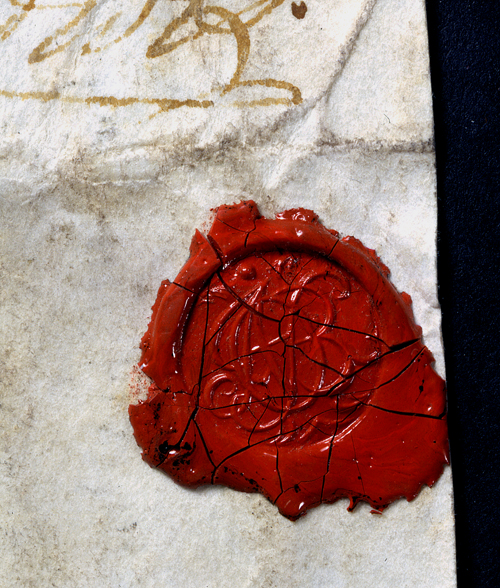
- Wells' seal
- Born: 10 September 1779; Saint Kitts
- Died: 13 May 1852 (aged 72); Bath, Somerset
- Occupations: Planter, politician, military officer

Nathaniel Wells (10 September 1779 – 13 May 1852) was a British planter and politician of Afro-Caribbean descent. Born on a slave plantation in Saint Kitts, he was sent to Britain to complete his education, eventually serving as a magistrate after being called to the bar. Inheriting his father's estates in the British West Indies, Wells was commissioned in the Yeomanry Cavalry in 1820, becoming the third Black person to serve as a British military officer after Captain John Perkins and Ensign James Swaby. He was also the first Black sheriff in Britain. Wells died in 1852, remaining wealthy despite his slaves having been emancipated 19 years earlier by the Slavery Abolition Act 1833.

== Early life ==
Nathaniel Wells was born on 10 September 1779 to William Wells and Juggy Wells. William was a Welshman from a wealthy Cardiff family who emigrated to Saint Kitts with his younger brother Nataniel. He became a successful slave trader before becoming a member of the planter class, owning several slave plantations. His wife Elizabeth, their son, and one daughter died and were buried in Basseterre and their surviving daughter Elizabeth married John Taylor, a colonist on Nevis. Following his wife's death, William Wells began fathering children by his female slaves – at least six, all by different women. Although sexual liaisons with slaves was a common practice at the time, Wells differed from the majority by looking after both the children and their mothers, giving them both their freedom and sums of money to live on—including Nathaniel's mother Juggy (d.1811), who became known as Joardine Wells following her manumission. William Wells died when Nathaniel was 15 years old and left the bulk of his estate to him as his only surviving, 'natural and dear' son. This included around £120,000 and three sugar plantations.

== Return to Wales ==
When Nathaniel was aged around ten, his father sent him to London to be educated, under the care of his uncle Nataniel until the age of 21. On completing his education, he remained in Britain, becoming a respected landowner in Monmouthshire, Wales. Wells also became a magistrate during his time in Britain, being one of the few Black British members of the British legal system at the time.

== Slave estates ==
Nathaniel managed his inherited sugar plantation estates like any absentee white owner. Wells had little control over the way the slaves he owned were treated, as the estates were leased out to local managers. The punishment of slaves by one of these managers was singled out for criticism by British abolitionists and became the subject of an abolitionist tract, although it would appear that this was with the tacit consent of Wells, who refrained from suppressing its publication through the courts. The crux of the issue concerned punishment of a slave owned by Wells - there were only supposed to be 39 lashes administered in one sitting of punishment, while it was alleged that a manager gave the slave 39 lashes plus a "brining" – putting pepper water onto those lashes to make the enslaved person scream.

Wells remained a plantation owner and slave owner until emancipation was enacted by law in St Kitts in 1833, and was compensated financially for his loss by the British government with the sum of £1,400 9s 7d for the ownership of 86 enslaved people on St Kitts.

== Piercefield House and Monmouthshire ==
By 1801, Wells had property worth an estimated £200,000 and was married to Harriet Este (1780–1820), the only daughter of Charles Este, a former chaplain to King George II. They had ten children including author Nathaniel Armstrong Wells (1806–1846), and churchmen Charles Rush Wells (1807-1869) and John Tighe Wells (1808-1848).

In 1802, he bought Piercefield House, Chepstow from Colonel Mark Wood, after agreeing to buy it for £90,000 over dinner. Wells added to Piercefield until it reached almost 3,000 acres (12 km²). He continued the tradition of allowing visitors access to the grounds of his estate, among them the landscape painter Joseph Farington, who having met him in 1803 noted in his diary: "Mr Wells is a West Indian of large fortune, a man of very gentlemanly manners, but so much a man of colour as to be little removed from a Negro".

Wells seems to have taken full part in local society. In 1804, he was appointed a churchwarden of St Arvans Church near Piercefield, a position he held for 40 years. Together with the Duke of Beaufort he contributed to the upkeep of the church fabric, and St Arvan's distinctive octagonal tower (1820) was his gift. In 1806, he was appointed a Justice of the Peace, while in 1832 he was on the committee of the Chepstow Hunt.

== Sheriff ==
On 24 January 1818, Wells became Britain's first Black sheriff when he was appointed sheriff of Monmouthshire by the Prince Regent, and a deputy lieutenant of the county.

== Yeomanry commission ==
On 29 May or 20 June 1820, Wells was commissioned as a lieutenant in the Loyal Monmouthshire Yeomanry Cavalry's Chepstow Troop. Wells was the third Black person to be commissioned as a British military officer after John Perkins, who was appointed as a lieutenant in the Royal Navy in 1782, and James Swaby, who was commissioned as an ensign in the British Army in 1814. Wells' commission was signed by the Lord Lieutenant of Monmouthshire Lord Beaufort, not the King, as were British Army commissions, and those in the later Special Reserve as held by Walter Tull during the First World War. Wells' military service was not just an honorary role; in 1822, he took part in actions against striking coal miners and iron workers in South Wales. Jackson's Oxford Journal of 11 May 1822 reprinted an article from the Bristol Mercury which recorded that:

"It was then decided that a party of the cavalry, under the command of Lieutenant Wells, of Piercefield, should form a kind of advance guard, and should precede the main body by about a mile, to prevent the breaking up of the roads." However, the road ran along a steep-sided valley, and his party came under attack from the iron workers, who threw down large stones and rocks. Even with the arrival of the rest of the Yeomanry, and the reading of the Riot Act, the road could not be cleared, and was not until three hours later, with the arrival of the regular cavalry of the Royal Scots Greys behind the workers, that the road was cleared.

He resigned his commission on 7 August 1822.

== Declining years ==
In 1850, in failing health, Wells sold Piercefield to John Russell (1788–1873). In 1832 Wells married his second wife, Esther Owen (1804–1871), daughter of John Owen (1766–1822). Esther's sister, Mary Frances Owen, was married to William Wilberforce (1798–1879), eldest son of William Wilberforce.

In all, Wells had 22 children. Two of his sons became clergymen. The eldest, Nathaniel Armstrong Wells (1806–1846) was an author, writing and illustrating an account of his travels through Spain.

Wells died at 9 Park Street, Lansdown in Bath, Somerset, in 1852 at the age of 72, worth an estimated £100,000. Esther Wells and four her daughters moved to Brighton after Wells' passing.

A memorial tablet can be seen at St Arvans Church, near Chepstow, Monmouthshire. Piercefield estate is now the home of Chepstow Racecourse, while the house is abandoned and derelict.

Esther Wells died in Brighton in 1871, having been recorded in the census of that year living with five of her daughters, Esther, Augusta, Catharine, Cecilia and Matilda Wells. Her daughters remained in the town through the late nineteenth into the early twentieth century.
