= John Sargent (priest) =

English clergyman, academic and biographer

- Born: 8 October 1780
- Died: 3 May 1833 (aged 52); Woolavington
- Education: Eton College
- Occupations: clergyman, academic and biographer
- Spouse: Mary Smith (m. 1804)

John Sargent (8 October 1780 – 3 May 1833) was an English clergyman, academic and biographer. Wealthy by background but a country pastor, he was a prominent Evangelical who came to be regarded by others on his wing of the Church of England as an exemplary cleric. He was also centrally connected, by ties to other major Evangelicals of the time.

== Life ==
He was the eldest son of John Sargent, M.P. for Seaford in 1790, and Charlotte (d. 1841), only daughter and heiress of Richard Bettesworth of Petworth, Sussex, born on 8 October 1780. He was educated at Eton College, where he was a king's scholar, and in 1799 in the sixth form. In 1799 he went to King's College, Cambridge, where he was a Fellow from 1802 to 1804, and graduated B.A. 1804, M.A. 1807.

At Cambridge Sargent fell under the influence of Charles Simeon, who shaped his career. Sargent was also drawn into Simeon's evangelical network. In 1804 he was the intermediary who ensured that Patrick Brontë was able to continue study at Cambridge: Henry Thornton and William Wilberforce provided financial support.

Intended for the law, Sargent was instead ordained deacon in 1805, and priest in 1806. On the presentation of his father he was instituted on 11 September 1805 to the family living of Graffham, Sussex, and from 5 June 1813 he held with it a second family rectory, that of nearby Woolavington.

At Graffham Sargent rebuilt the rectory-house, and on these benefices he lived for the rest of his days, becoming on his father's death the squire of the district. He died at Woolavington on 3 May 1833, and was buried there.

== Works ==
Sargent was the author of a Memoir of the Rev. Henry Martyn [anon.], 1819, with a second edition in the same year, when the authorship was acknowledged; it was often reprinted. In 1833 he brought out The Life of the Rev. T. T. Thomason, late Chaplain to the Hon. E.I.C., dedicated to Simeon, by whom both these memoirs were prompted. Sargent's account of the last days of William Hayley was printed in Hayley's Memoirs.

== Family ==
Sargent married at Carlton Hall, Nottinghamshire, on 29 November 1804, Mary, only daughter of Abel Smith, a first cousin of William Wilberforce. She died on 6 July 1861, aged 82, having for many years presided over the house of her son-in-law Samuel Wilberforce, and was buried at Woollavington. Their issue was two sons (who died early) and five daughters:

- Elizabeth Charlotte Sargent (1805–1818)
- Emily Sargent (1807–1841), married, on 11 June 1828, Samuel Wilberforce
- John Garton Sargent (1808–1829)
- Mary Sargent (died 1878), married, on 24 July 1834, Henry William Wilberforce, brother of Samuel
- Caroline Sargent (1812–1837), married, on 7 November 1833, Henry Edward Manning
- Sophia Lucy Sargent (1814–1850), married, on 5 June 1834, George Dudley Ryder, second son of Henry Ryder
- Henry Martyn Sargent (1816–1836)

Sargent's younger brother George Hanway Sargent was shot and killed in November 1807, aged 25, in the pursuit of the highwayman, Jim Allen.

== Notes ==
Attribution This article incorporates text from a publication now in the public domain: Lee, Sidney, ed. (1897). "Sargent, John (1780-1833)". Dictionary of National Biography. Vol. 50. London: Smith, Elder & Co.
