= Soapy Sam =

Soapy Sam may refer to:

- Samuel Wilberforce, Bishop of Winchester
- Samuel Hoare, 1st Viscount Templewood, Conservative politician
