= John Owen (1766–1822) =

English Anglican priest

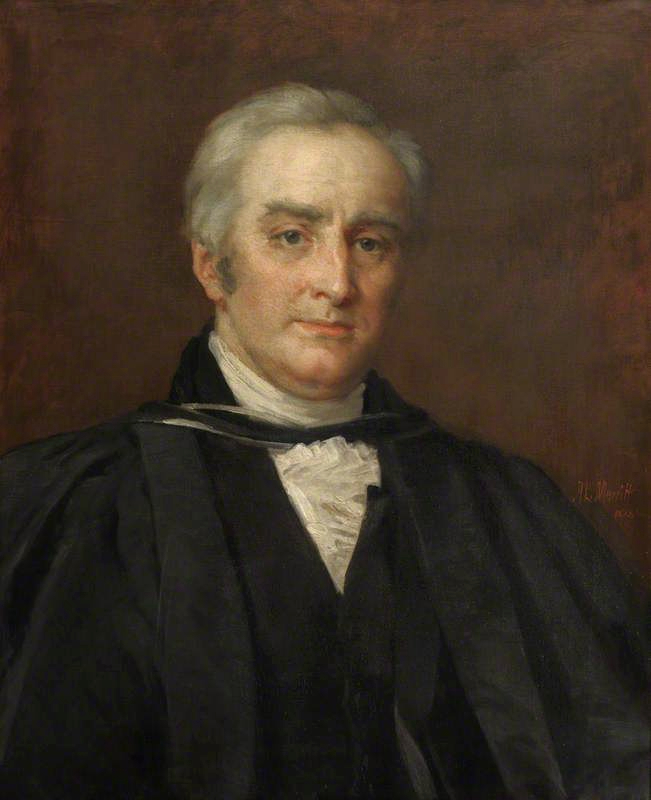
- Born: 1766
- Died: 26 September 1822 (aged 55–56); Ramsgate
- Spouse: Charlotte Green

John Owen (1766 – 26 September 1822) was an English Anglican priest, a secretary on its foundation of the British and Foreign Bible Society.

== Life ==
The son of Richard Owen, a jeweller of Old Street, London, he entered St Paul's School on 18 October 1777. He went on, in 1784, as Sykes exhibitioner, to Magdalene College, Cambridge, where he was admitted as sizar. He migrated to Corpus Christi College, Cambridge, and was admitted a scholar there later in 1784, graduated B.A. in 1788, became a Fellow in 1789, and proceeded M.A. in 1791.

In the spring of 1791, Owen went on the continent of Europe, at first as tutor to a young gentleman. In September 1792, he left Geneva for the south of France, and arrived in Lyon to find it in the hands of revolutionaries. He returned to Switzerland, and so to England, in 1793.

Shortly after his return Owen was ordained. At the end of 1795 he was presented by Beilby Porteus, bishop of London, to the curacy of Fulham, Middlesex, where he resided for seventeen and a half years. Porteus had presented him in 1808 to the rectory of Paglesham, Essex; and when, in 1813, John Randolph, Porteus's successor, insisted that Owen resided there, he resigned the Fulham curacy. He later became minister of Park Chapel, Chelsea.

== British and Foreign Bible Society ==
Owen's connection with the British and Foreign Bible Society (BFBS) is his main claim to fame. From 23 April 1804—a few weeks after its foundation—until his death he was its principal secretary, an unpaid position.

In August 1818 Owen went abroad, to assist with the establishment of a branch bible society in Paris, and to inspect the progress of the Turkish New Testament, then in course of preparation for the society by Jean-Daniel Kieffer. He visited J. F. Oberlin and the branches established at Zurich, St. Gall, Constance, and other Swiss towns. He returned to England in December.

== Death ==
Owen died at Ramsgate on 26 September 1822, and was buried at Fulham.

== Works ==
Owen published some letters which he had addressed to William Belsham, as Travels into Different Parts of Europe, in the years 1791 and 1792, with familiar Remarks on Places, Men, and Manners, London, 1796, 2 vols. On 11 March and 5 August 1794 Owen preached assize sermons in Great St Mary's. These were published at Cambridge in 1794. In the same year he published The Retrospect; or Reflections on the State of Religion and Politics in France and Great Britain, London, 1794.

Owen wrote also, on his own account:

- The Christian Monitor for the last Days, 1799; 2nd edit. 1808.
- An Earnest Expostulation with those who Live in the Neglect of Public Worship, London, 1801.
- The Fashionable World Displayed by "Theophilus Christian, esq.", 1st edit. London, 1804; 2nd edit., with a dedication to Beilby Porteus, bishop of London, 3rd edit. 1805; 5th edit. 1805; 7th edit. 1809. An eighth edition was published before 1822. A New York edition from the fifth London edition appeared in 1806.
- Discourse Occasioned by the Death of William Sharp, Esq. Late of Fulham House (1810). Funeral sermon on the surgeon William Sharp.

As BFBS secretary, Owen wrote:

- Letter to a Country Clergyman, occasioned by his Address to Lord Teignmouth, &c., by a Suburban Clergyman (1805)
- An Address to the Chairman of the East India Company, London, 1st, 2nd, and 3rd editions, 1807. It was a reply to an attack by Thomas Twining and John Scott-Waring on the society's work in India, on the ground that a conquered nation's free exercise of religion was being improperly limited.
- The History of the Origin and First Ten Years of the British and Foreign Bible Society, 2 vols. London, 1816. It was reviewed by Robert Southey in the Quarterly Review, 1827, who criticised the society's translations. A French translation of the work appeared.

== Family ==
Owen married Charlotte Green in 1794, and they settled in Cambridge. Several of their children survived him, including sons Henry and John Orde. Their daughter Mary Frances married in 1820 William Wilberforce (1798–1879), the eldest son of William Wilberforce, who was being coached by Owen for a career as barrister. Esther Owen (1804–1871) married in 1823 Nathaniel Wells, as his second wife.
