= Wilberforce pendulum =

Coupled mechanical oscillator

A Wilberforce pendulum alternates between two oscillation modes.

A Wilberforce pendulum, invented by British physicist Lionel Robert Wilberforce around 1896, consists of a mass suspended by a long helical spring and free to turn on its vertical axis, twisting the spring. It is an example of a coupled mechanical oscillator, often used as a demonstration in physics education. The mass can both bob up and down on the spring, and rotate back and forth about its vertical axis with torsional vibrations. When correctly adjusted and set in motion, it exhibits a curious motion in which periods of purely rotational oscillation gradually alternate with periods of purely up and down oscillation. The energy stored in the device shifts slowly back and forth between the translational 'up and down' oscillation mode and the torsional 'clockwise and counterclockwise' oscillation mode, until the motion eventually dies away.

Despite the name, in normal operation it does not swing back and forth as ordinary pendulums do. The mass usually has opposing pairs of radial 'arms' sticking out horizontally, threaded with small weights that can be screwed in or out to adjust the moment of inertia to 'tune' the torsional vibration period.

== Explanation ==
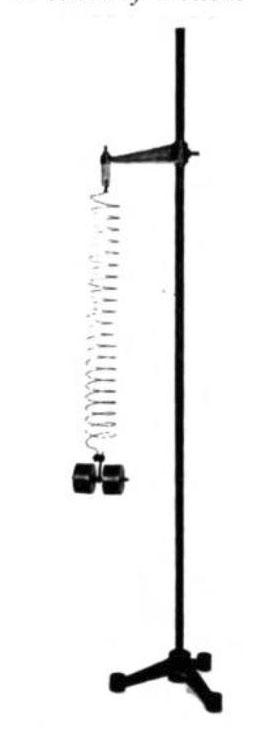
Wilberforce pendulum, 1908

The device's intriguing behavior is caused by a slight coupling between the two motions or degrees of freedom, due to the geometry of the spring. When the weight is moving up and down, each downward excursion of the spring causes it to unwind slightly, giving the weight a slight twist. When the weight moves up, it causes the spring to wind slightly tighter, giving the weight a slight twist in the other direction. So when the weight is moving up and down, each oscillation gives a slight alternating rotational torque to the weight. In other words, during each oscillation some of the energy in the translational mode leaks into the rotational mode. Slowly the up and down movement gets less, and the rotational movement gets greater, until the weight is just rotating and not bobbing.

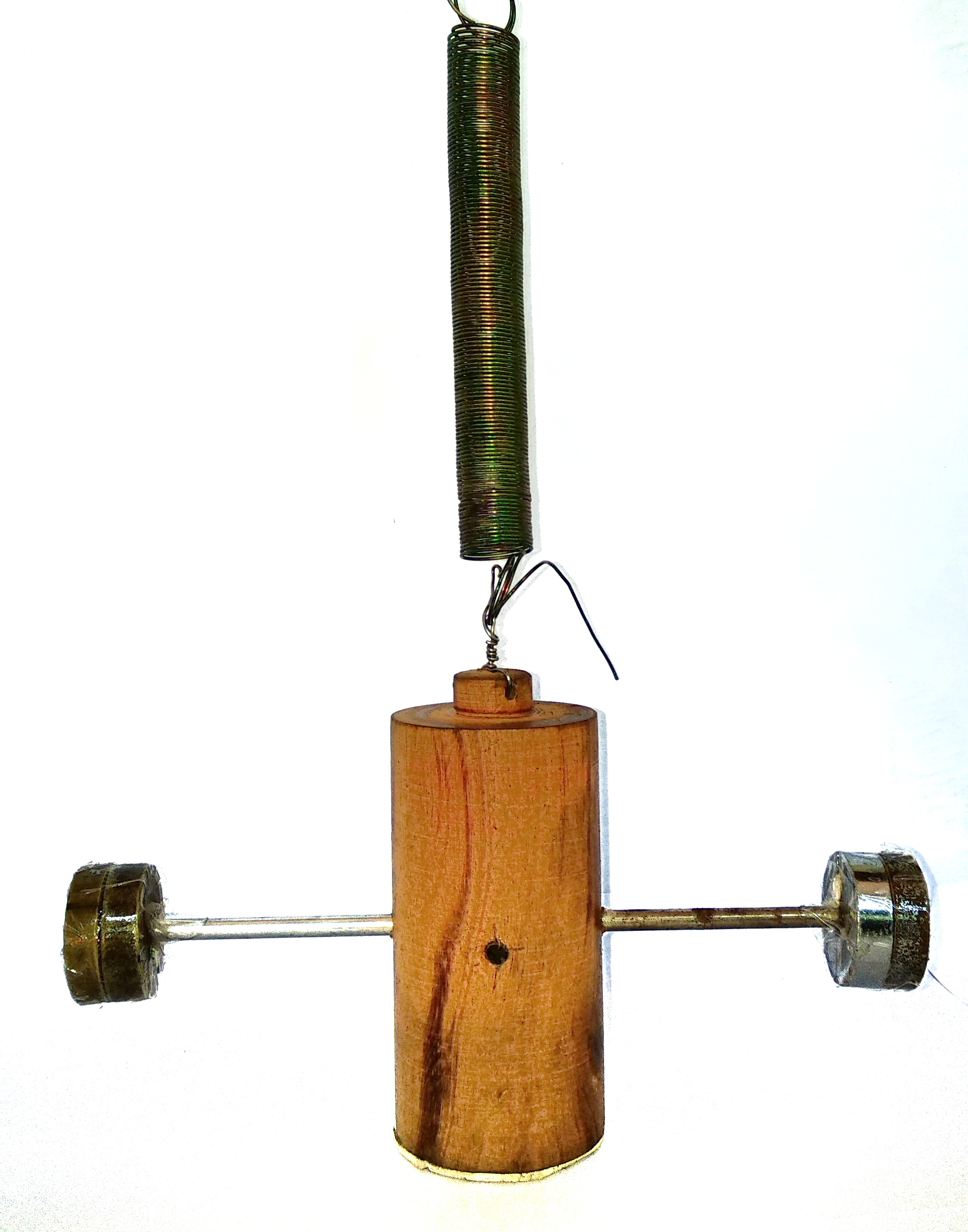
A wooden Wilberforce pendulum with adjustable masses.

Similarly, when the weight is rotating back and forth, each twist of the weight in the direction that unwinds the spring also reduces the spring tension slightly, causing the weight to sag a little lower. Conversely, each twist of the weight in the direction of winding the spring tighter causes the tension to increase, pulling the weight up slightly. So each oscillation of the weight back and forth causes it to bob up and down more, until all the energy is transferred back from the rotational mode into the translational mode and it is just bobbing up and down, not rotating.

A Wilberforce pendulum can be designed by approximately equating the frequency of harmonic oscillations of the spring-mass oscillator f_{T}, which is dependent on the spring constant k of the spring and the mass m of the system, and the frequency of the rotating oscillator f_{R}, which is dependent on the moment of inertia I and the torsional coefficient κ of the system.

$f_T=\frac{1}{2\pi}\sqrt\frac{k}{m} \approx \frac{1}{2\pi}\sqrt\frac{\kappa}{I}=f_R$

The pendulum is usually adjusted by moving the moment of inertia adjustment weights towards or away from the centre of the mass by equal amounts on each side in order to modify f_{R}, until the rotational frequency is close to the translational frequency, so the alternation period will be slow enough to allow the change between the two modes to be clearly seen.

== Alternation or 'beat' frequency ==
The frequency at which the two modes alternate is equal to the difference between the oscillation frequencies of the modes. The closer in frequency the two motions are, the slower will be the alternation between them. This behavior, common to all coupled oscillators, is analogous to the phenomenon of beats in musical instruments, in which two tones combine to produce a 'beat' tone at the difference between their frequencies. For example, if the pendulum bobs up and down at a rate of f_{T} = 4 Hz, and rotates back and forth about its axis at a rate of f_{R} = 4.1 Hz, the alternation rate f_{alt} will be:

$f_{\rm alt} = f_R - f_T = 0.1\; \mathrm{Hz}$

$T_{\rm alt} = 1 / f_{\rm alt} = 10\; \mathrm{s}$

So the motion will change from rotational to translational in 5 seconds and then back to rotational in the next 5 seconds. If the two frequencies are exactly equal, the beat frequency will be zero, and resonance will occur.
