= Henry Wilberforce =

English Catholic clergyman, newspaper proprietor, editor and journalist

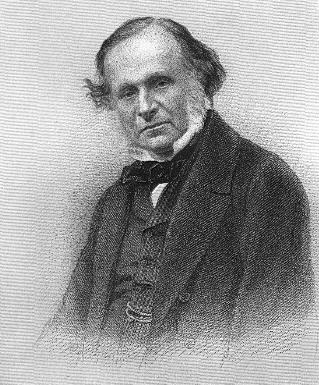
- Born: 22 September 1807; Clapham
- Died: 23 April 1873 (aged 65); Stroud, Gloucestershire
- Education: Oriel College, Oxford
- Occupations: clergyman, editor, journalist
- Notable credit(s): Weekly Register, Dublin Review
- Spouse: Mary Sargent
- Children: 9
- Parent(s): William Wilberforce; Barbara Ann Spooner
- Relatives: Robert Wilberforce (brother); Samuel Wilberforce (brother)

Henry William Wilberforce (22 September 1807 – 23 April 1873) was an English Tractarian cleric of the Church of England and then Catholic newspaper proprietor, editor and journalist.

== Early life ==
He was the fourth and youngest son of William Wilberforce and his wife, Barbara Ann Spooner, his brothers being the lawyer William Wilberforce the younger and the clerics Robert Wilberforce and Samuel Wilberforce. He was educated by clerical tutors, firstly when he was nine by John Sargent at Graffham, a follower of Charles Simeon linked to the Wilberforces by marriage.

When he was about 15, Wilberforce was moved with his brother Samuel to the Cambridge graduate Francis Roach Spragg, 13th wrangler in 1808, at Bidborough in Kent; Spragg became vicar of Combe St Nicholas in Somerset in 1823. Spragg was another evangelical, and his wife Eliza was a granddaughter of Henry Venn. One of Samuel's contemporaries there was Henry William Soltau, father of Henrietta Soltau.

== At Oxford ==
Wilberforce matriculated in 1826 at Oriel College, Oxford, graduating B.A. in 1830 and M.A. in 1833. He was elected president of the Oxford Union. He graduated with a first class in classics and a second class in mathematics. He enrolled in 1831 as a student at Lincoln's Inn, but remained at Oxford, and won the Ellerton theological prize.

From the long vacation in 1827, Wilberforce had received private tuition from John Henry Newman. According to Ian Ker, he became one of Newman's closest friends. By 1840 Wilberforce was for Newman the unique personal friend who took an "affectionate interest" in his inner life. Through Newman's influence, Wilberforce gave up his plan for a legal career, and instead took orders as an Anglican clergyman. Henry's brother Robert, a Fellow of Oriel, could not countenance Henry's "devoted discipleship".

An internal clash at Oriel in 1830 over tuition began to define positions that later gave rise to the Tractarian movement. Newman wished to involve Wilberforce, recently graduated, with Hurrell Froude and Joseph Dornford, as tutors with a pastoral role for selected students. Edward Hawkins, Provost of the college, reacted by vetoing Froude, Newman and Robert Wilberforce as tutors. Newman's replacement was Renn Hampden.

Newman's memoir of Wilberforce listed as Oxford friends of Wilberforce outside Oriel John Rogers and Henry Edward Manning at Balliol College, and Thomas Acland at Christ Church. College associates included Thomas Mozley, Frederic Rogers, George Dudley Ryder, Robert Francis Wilson, and Samuel Francis Wood. In 1832 Wilberforce arranged a curacy for Manning with John Sargent.

== Anglican priest ==
Wilberforce was married at St Peter's Church, East Lavington in 1834 by Charles Richard Sumner; who also gave him his first living, as perpetual curate of Bransgore, Hampshire. Newman visited him there, and in October 1834 made in confidence to Wilberforce a first intimation of his possible Catholic conversion. On one occasion William Henry Anderdon, Manning's nephew and not yet an Oxford undergraduate, encountered Newman at Bransgore.

At this period Newman talked Wilberforce into authoring a pamphlet against his opponents in the Oriel Noetics, including Hawkins, Hampden and Richard Whately; at a moment when Joseph Blanco White of their number had become a Unitarian. It appeared anonymously as The Foundation of the Faith Assailed in Oxford in 1835. In 1836 Wilberforce won the Deniers Theological Prize for an essay on the Trinity.

Wilberforce then had two preferments. He was vicar of Walmer from 1841, appointed by Archbishop William Howley; Ambrose St John who had been taken on at Bransgore moved on as curate to him. He was, on the recommendation of Albert, Prince Consort, finally vicar of East Farleigh, Kent (1843). There, some innovations in services caused a complaint to Howley; Archdeacon William Lyall investigated, and found no case of ritualism to answer.

== Catholic convert ==
Wilberforce was one of the group of priests who left the Church of England in the aftermath of the appeal judgement of 1850 in the Gorham case. It included Manning, and in due course his brother Robert. Wilberforce and his wife Mary were received into the Catholic Church; he wrote Reasons for Submitting to the Catholic Church: a Farewell Letter to his Parishioners (1851). The decision terminated his clerical career, and he had money troubles.

Mary had been received by James Brownbill SJ shortly after the birth of her son Ignatius in June 1850. The family then took a vacation at Malines, during which Wilberforce made a retreat with Jesuits in Brussels. He was received as a Catholic on 15 September.

== Ireland ==
The Catholic Defence Association was founded in Ireland in 1851, and in 1852, Wilberforce became its Secretary, moving to Ireland for several years. The appointment had the backing of Archbishop Paul Cullen, but was contentious. Wilberforce engaged in controversy on Church of Ireland proselytizing. He published Proselytism in Ireland (1852) based on correspondence with Alexander Dallas of the Irish Church Missions. Richard Whately, now Church of Ireland Archbishop of Dublin, weighed in on the side of Dallas, asking if the allegations of "bribery and intimidation" could be verified.

Henry's brother Robert, who died in 1857, had an estate at Ballynakill, Connemara. While Protestant missions operated in the area, land purchases after the Great Famine by Catholics impeded them. Henry Wilberforce bought the nearby island of Inishbofin, County Galway, site of souperism efforts, completing the deal with the 3rd Marquess of Sligo, which involved also a number of townlands, in 1858. Litigation ensued. During the 1870s Wilberforce owned 4,378 acres (1,772 ha) in county Galway, and then sold out to Cyril Allies, son of Thomas William Allies.

== Later life ==
In 1854, Wilberforce became owner and editor of the weekly Catholic Standard published in London, changing the name to the Weekly Register the following year. It positioned its editorial line as a "liberal rival" for Catholics to The Tablet, an ultramontanist organ.

In 1864 Wilberforce sold the Register, and began writing for the Dublin Review. After his death, a selection of his articles was published as The Church and the Empires (1874), with a biographical preface by Newman. He joined the Jamaica Committee of 1865.

Henry Wilberforce died in Stroud, Gloucestershire, on 23 April 1873. In 1882, in the Saturday Review, Mark Pattison wrote of him as "mercurial, intensely clever, agaçant, susceptible".

== Publications ==
- The Foundation of the Faith Assailed in Oxford: a letter to His Grace the Archbishop of Canterbury, &c. &c. &c. Visitor to the University, with particular reference to the changes in its constitution, now under consideration. By a clerical member of Convocation [i.e. H.W. Wilberforce]. London: Printed for J.G. & F. Rivington, 1835.
- The Parochial System: An Appeal to English Churchmen. London: Printed for J. G. & F. Rivington, St. Paul's Church Yard, and Waterloo Place, Pall Mall, 1838.
- The Building of the House of God: a sermon preached in the Church of All Saints, Southampton [...]August 13, 1839 at the rebuilding of the ancient church of St. Lawrence. Southampton: Smart, 1839.
- Christian Unity. Tracts on the Church 7. London: James Burns, 1842.
- On the Danger of State Interference with the Trust Deeds of Church Schools. A Letter to Sir R. H. Inglis. London, 1847.
- Reasons for Submitting to the Catholic Church: a Farewell Letter to his Parishioners. London: Burns and Lambert, 1851.
- The Church and the Empires: historical periods. Preceded by a memoir of the author by J.H. Newman. London: Henry S. King & Co., 1874.

== Family ==
Wilberforce married in 1834 Mary Sargent, fourth daughter of his former tutor John Sargent. The couple had five sons and four daughters, four of whom died young.

The children were:

- John William Wilberforce (1835–1847)
- Mary Florence Wilberforce (1837–1841)
- Arthur Henry Wilberforce (1839–1904) second son and third child, name in religion Bertrand, was a Roman Catholic priest and a member of the Dominican Order from 1864, when he moved from Ushaw College to Woodchester Priory near Stroud.
- Ambrose Newman Wilberforce (1841–1842)
- Caroline Mary Wilberforce (1843–1915), Franciscan nun
- Agnes Everilda Mary Wilberforce (1845–1890), married 1881 as his second wife Richard Hurrell Froude, son of William Froude.
- Henry Edward Wilberforce (1847–1938), married in 1885 Emily Mary Moody, daughter of Robert Sadleir Moody, an Anglican priest and Catholic convert.
- Wilfrid Ignatius Wilberforce (1850–1910)
- Mary Phillippa Veronica Sophia Wilberforce (born and died 1853)

Henry Wilberforce in his first year at Oxford had met the four unmarried daughters of John Sargent, who died in 1833. In 1828 Emily Sargent married his brother Samuel; in 1833 Caroline Sargent married Henry Manning; and in 1834 Sophia Lucy George Dudley Ryder, son of Henry Ryder and at Oriel with Henry Wilberforce. The connection of the Wilberforces and Sargents ran through William Wilberforce's mother Elizabeth Bird, whose sister Mary Bird had married Abel Smith the elder, grandfather of John Sargent's wife Mary Smith. Newsome writes of "closest of bonds between Manning and the Wilberforce and Sargent families." Henry Manning was the successor to Sargent in the Suffolk livings of Graffham and Woolavington. The Lavington Park estate near Woolavington passed to Emily Wilberforce, who died in 1841, and so to Samuel Wilberforce.
