= William Wilberforce (1798–1879) =

English politician (1798–1879)

- Born: 21 July 1798; Clapham, Surrey, England
- Died: 26 May 1879 (aged 80); Surbiton, Surrey, England
- Occupation: Lawyer
- Spouse: Mary Frances Owen (m. 1820)
- Parent(s): William Wilberforce; Barbara Spooner
- Relatives: Robert Wilberforce (brother); Samuel Wilberforce (brother); Henry Wilberforce (brother)

William Wilberforce (21 July 1798 – 26 May 1879) was a British lawyer, the eldest son of William Wilberforce. He was briefly a Member of Parliament in 1837–38.

== Life ==
Wilberforce was born in Clapham on 21 July 1798 to William Wilberforce, a member of Parliament and prominent abolitionist campaigner, and his wife Barbara Wilberforce. He was their eldest child. He was educated at a school in Cambridgeshire before attending Trinity College, Cambridge in 1817–1820, and was then admitted to study at the Middle Temple. He was called to the Bar in 1825.

He was a Justice of the Peace for Yorkshire and for Middlesex, and at the 1837 general election was returned as a Conservative for Kingston upon Hull, a seat his father had represented in the 1780s, but this was overturned by an election petition the following year. He did not return to Parliament, though he contested Taunton in the 1841 general election, and Bradford in a subsequent by-election.

In 1850, Wilberforce converted to Catholicism, along with his youngest brother, Henry, a parson in Kent. Four years later, a third brother, Robert, would also resign his Anglican archdeaconry and follow them.

== Family ==
Mrs William Wilberforce and Child by John Linnell, 1824

Wilberforce married in 1820 Mary Frances Owen, daughter of John Owen (1766–1822). His sister and brother in law through Mary Owen were Esther Owen (1804–1871) and Nathaniel Wells.
