= Barbara Wilberforce =

Wife of William Wilberforce

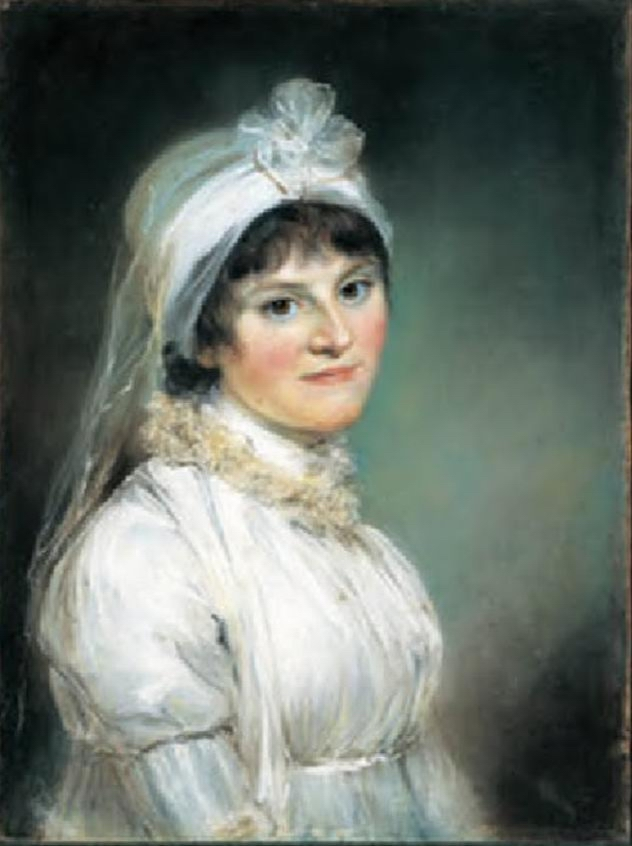
- Portrait in about 1797 by John Russell
- Born: Barbara Ann Spooner; 1771; Birches Green, Erdington, Warwickshire
- Died: 21 April 1847 (aged 75–76); The Vicarage, East Farleigh, Kent
- Spouse: William Wilberforce (m. 1797)
- Children: 6, including William, Robert, Samuel and Henry
- Parent(s): Isaac Spooner; Barbara Gough

Barbara Ann Wilberforce (née Spooner; 1771 – 21 April 1847) was the wife of abolitionist and politician William Wilberforce.

== Early life ==
Barbara Wilberforce was born in Birches Green, Erdington, Warwickshire, and died in The Vicarage, East Farleigh, Kent. She was the eldest daughter and third child of Isaac Spooner of Elmdon Hall, Warwickshire, a banker of Birmingham, and his wife, Barbara Gough-Calthorpe, daughter of Sir Henry Gough, 1st Baronet, sister of Henry Gough-Calthorpe, 1st Baron Calthorpe and granddaughter of the MP Reynolds Calthorpe.

On 15 April 1797, while at Bath, she met her future husband, William Wilberforce, to whom she had been recommended by Wilberforce's friend, Thomas Babington. The couple were married at Church of St Swithin, Walcot, Bath on 30 May 1797.

== Later life ==
Wilberforce almost died following an attack of typhoid in 1800, after which her health was never strong. Nevertheless, she bore six children, all of whom survived to adulthood. The children were William (July 1798), Barbara (1799), Elizabeth (1801), Robert (1802), Samuel (1805), and Henry (1807).

Following her husband's death in 1833, Barbara Wilberforce spent her time with her sons, Robert and Samuel, or with her sister Ann Neale in Taplow in Buckinghamshire. She died in The Vicarage, East Farleigh, Kent and is buried next to East Farleigh church, her son Robert Wilberforce's first benefice, and where her son Henry would minister a decade later.

== Amazing Grace ==
In the 2006 film Amazing Grace, about her husband's involvement in the movement to eliminate the slave trade, she was portrayed by Romola Garai.
