= Lionel Wilberforce =

British physicist

- Born: 18 April 1861; Munich, Kingdom of Bavaria
- Died: 4 January 1944 (aged 82); London, United Kingdom
- Education: University of Cambridge
- Scientific career
- Doctoral advisor: J. J. Thomson

Lionel Robert Wilberforce (18 April 1861 – 1 April 1944) was a British physicist. He is best known for the invention of the Wilberforce pendulum, which exhibits a curious motion in which periods of purely rotational oscillation gradually alternate with periods of purely up and down oscillation.

== Life ==
Lionel Robert Wilberforce was born in Munich, Kingdom of Bavaria to his mother Fanny Flash and his father who was Edward Wilberforce (1834–1914), son of Robert Wilberforce. He was educated in England and graduated from Trinity College, Cambridge in 1884. He worked with J. J. Thomson at the Cavendish Laboratory in Cambridge and was appointed lecturer in 1900. In the same year he became professor of physics at University College, Liverpool (later University of Liverpool). He retired from this position in 1935.

== Work ==
In 1896 he published his work on vibrations of a loaded spiral spring, today known as Wilberforce pendulum. Most of Wilberforce's time at the University of Cambridge and University of Liverpool was dedicated to teaching.
