= Robert Wilberforce =

English clergyman and writer (1802–1857)

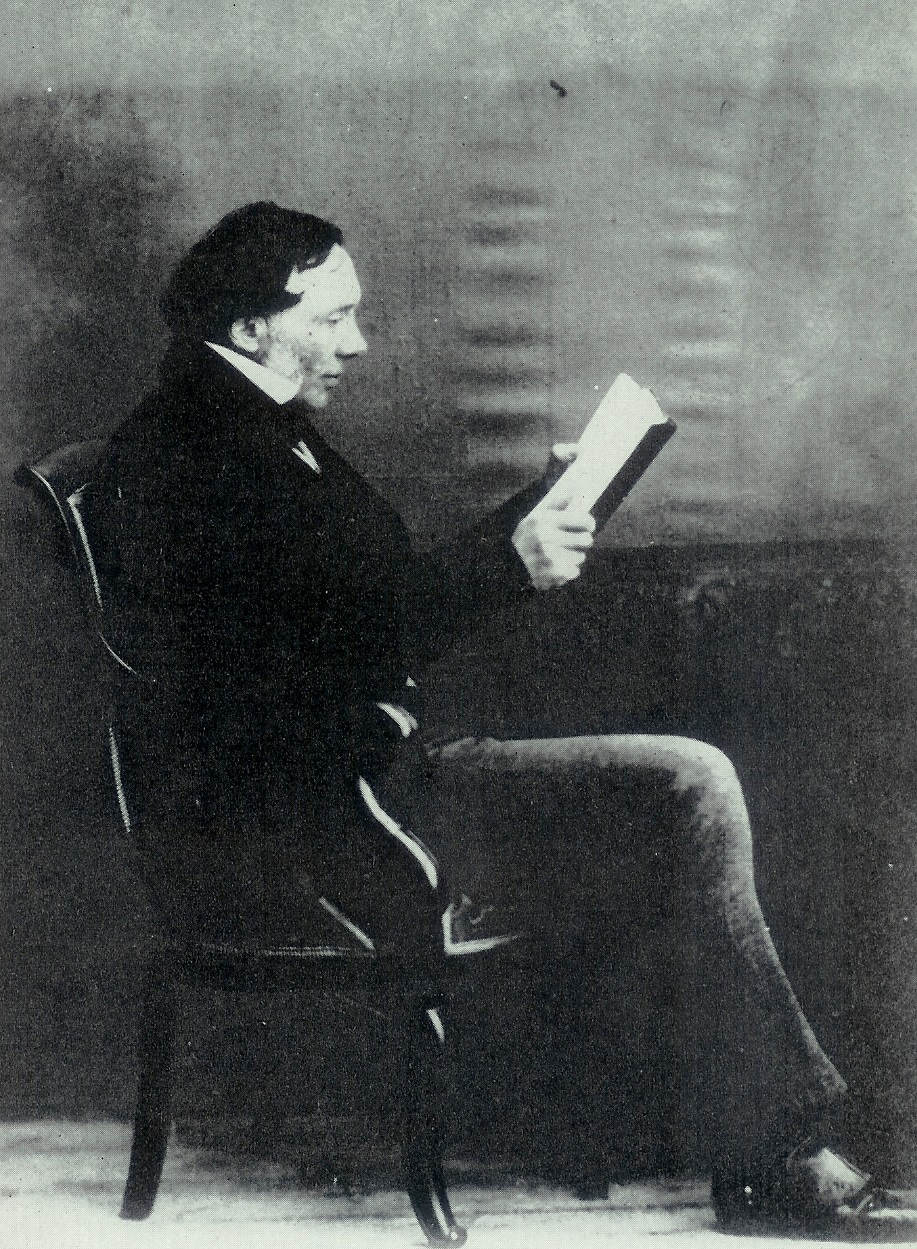
- Robert Wilberforce
- Born: 19 December 1802
- Died: 3 February 1857 (aged 54)
- Education: Oriel College, Oxford
- Occupations: clergyman, writer
- Spouse(s): Agnes Everilda Frances Wrangham; Jane Legard
- Parent(s): William Wilberforce; Barbara Ann Spooner
- Relatives: William Wilberforce, Jr (brother); Samuel Wilberforce (brother); Henry Wilberforce (brother)

Robert Isaac Wilberforce (19 December 1802 – 3 February 1857) was an English clergyman and writer.

== Early life and education ==
He was second son of abolitionist William Wilberforce, and active in the Oxford Movement. He was educated at Oriel College, Oxford, taking a double first in 1823.

== Career ==
In 1826, he was chosen fellow of Oriel and was ordained, among his friends and colleagues being Newman, Pusey and Keble. Though Wilberforce is perhaps lesser known, all were prominent figures within the Oxford Movement and involved in the publication of the Tracts for the Times.

For a few years he was one of the tutors at Oriel. The provost Edward Hawkins disliked his religious views, and in 1831 Wilberforce resigned and left Oxford. His release from Oxford gave him the opportunity to study in German areas; his familiarity with German theology and competency as a German scholar being one of the things for which he was most revered among his contemporaries.

In 1832 he obtained the living of East Farleigh, Kent, which in 1840 he exchanged for that of Burton Agnes, near Hull.

In 1841, he was appointed archdeacon of the East Riding of Yorkshire. About this time Wilberforce became close with Henry Manning, and they exchanged many letters on theological and ecclesiastical questions. They were deeply involved in re-examining the relationship between the Church of England and Roman Catholicism. On 27 March 1848, Robert Wilberforce and his brother Samuel joined the Canterbury Association.

It was during his time in Burton Agnes, and his correspondence with Manning, that Robert’s real struggle with his religion began. The slow pace of life ensured much of his time was spent mulling over the same arguments over and over again. His growing disillusionment was centred on what he perceived to be an untidy boundary between the State and the Church which caused his allegiance to the Church of England to gradually wane until it disappeared altogether.

In 1851, Manning joined the Roman Catholic Church, and three years later Wilberforce took the same step. His conversion came as a reaction to the so-called Gorham Judgement. The effects of which seemed to affirm Robert’s doubts and consequently his conviction that the Church of England was a heretical body to which he could no longer belong with a clear conscience, turning his loyalty away from Canterbury and York, towards Rome for good.

It is also thought that the controversy excited following the publication of his Doctrine of the Holy Eucharist - the third in a series of such doctrines which re-examined sacramental teaching and were published in the years 1848 to 1853 – may have propelled him towards the Roman Catholic Church, forcing him to finally make the decision he had struggled with for so many years. So extreme were his views on the Eucharist that they were considered heretical and once rumours of prosecution began to reach him in the summer of 1854 Robert’s mind was made up. On 30 August he recalled his subscription to the Oath of Supremacy and submitted his resignation from all his posts to the Archbishop and in October made the trip to Paris where he was to be received into the Church of Rome on All Saints’ Eve.

== Death ==
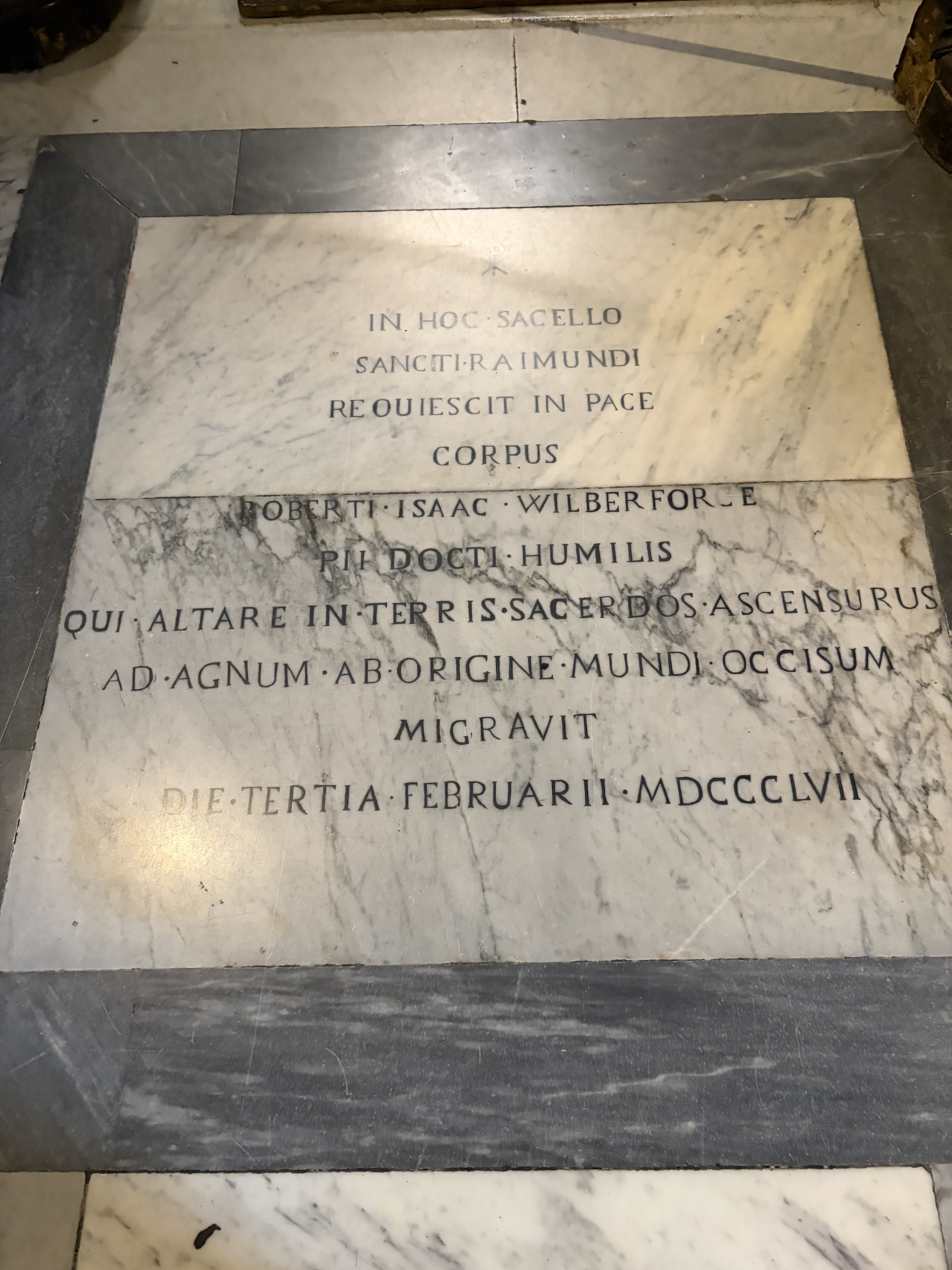
Grave of Robert Wilberforce in Santa Maria sopra Minerva

He was preparing for his (Roman Catholic) ordination when he died at Albano on 3 February 1857. He is buried in Rome at the Basilica of Santa Maria sopra Minerva, near the Pantheon. His tomb is situated just outside the right transept of the church.

== Family ==
Wilberforce was pre-deceased by his first wife Agnes Everilda Frances Wrangham (1800–1834) and second wife Jane Legard (d. 1854).

He was survived by two sons, William Francis Wilberforce (1833–1905), Vicar of Brodsworth and president of the Oxford Union, and Edward Wilberforce (1834–1914), who became one of the masters of the Supreme Court of Judicature. Edward's son, Lionel Robert Wilberforce, (1861–1944) was, in 1900, appointed professor of physics in the University of Liverpool, and his other children were:

- Sir Herbert William Wrangham Wilberforce, Barrister (1864–1941)
- Alexander (Alex) Basil Edward Wilberforce (1867–1902)
- Evelyn Agnes Fannie Wilberforce (1872–1954)

R. I. Wilberforce assisted his brother, Samuel Wilberforce to write the Life and to edit the Correspondence of his father.

== Writings ==
- Church Courts and Church Discipline (1843);
- Doctrine of the Holy Eucharist (1853);
- Doctrine of the Incarnation in Relation to Mankind and the Church (1848 and later editions);
- The Five Empires, a Sketch of Ancient History (1840);
- The Doctrine of Holy Baptism (1849);
- A Sketch of the History of Erastianism (1851); and
- An Enquiry into the Principles of Church Authority (1854)

His first published work was a romance, Rutilius and Lucius (1842).

Robert was regarded as one of the greatest scholars of the Oxford Movement and his knowledge of Christian doctrine not easily matched by his contemporaries. The contents of his library are testament to this with known collections surviving at Wilberforce House Museum, Hull and within the University of York’s Rare Books Library. The subject matter contained within these libraries is wide-ranging, reflecting the interests, passions and religious devotion of the Wilberforce family and are thought to have been actively used for self-improvement and religious inspiration as evidenced through the many examples of handwritten notes and annotations that can be found.
