= James Swaby =

Jamaican officer (1798–1863)

James Swaby (14 January 1798 – 3 February 1863) was a Jamaican man of colour who was one of the first non-white commissioned officers in the British Army. He purchased a commission with the 49th Regiment of Foot when aged 16, and served as an ensign on half pay from 1814 to 20 November 1829.

He was the son of John Swaby and Frances King, "a free mulatto". He was educated at Charterhouse School in England.

Swaby inherited substantial estates and became a wealthy planter and slave owner; he owned "considerable property" in Manchester Parish, Jamaica. In 1823, he was granted "all the privileges ... of a British subject". As a slave owner, he received compensation under the Slave Compensation Act 1837.
