= Samuel Wilberforce =

Bishop of Oxford, England (1805–1873)

The Right Reverend Samuel Wilberforce FRS
- Bishop of Winchester
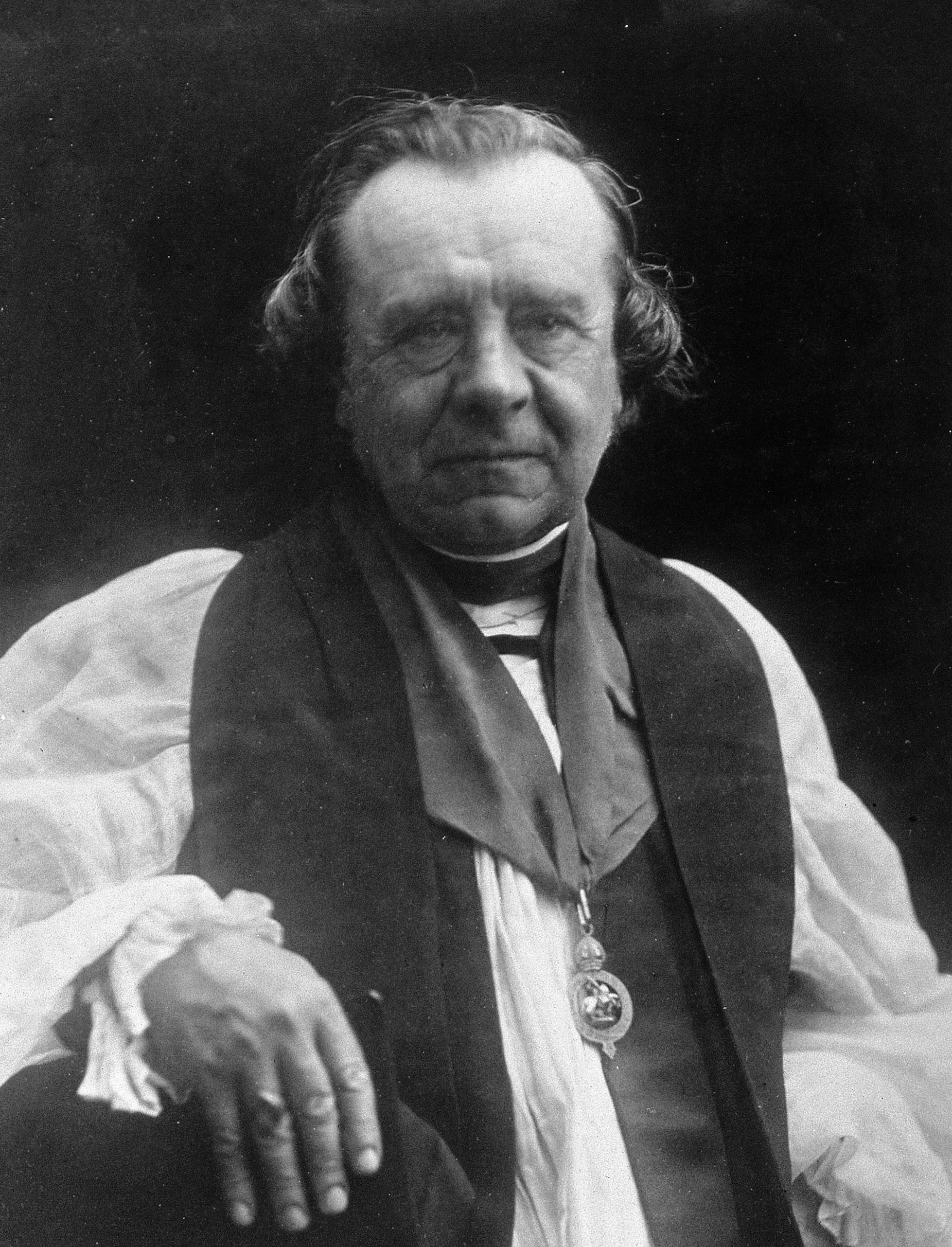
- Photograph by Julia Margaret Cameron
- Church: Church of England
- See: Winchester
- In office: 1870–1873
- Predecessor: Charles Sumner
- Successor: Harold Browne
- Previous posts: Bishop of Oxford; Dean of Westminster

Orders
- Ordination: 1828

Personal details
- Born: 7 September 1805 Clapham Common, London, England
- Died: 19 July 1873 (aged 67) Dorking, Surrey, England
- Education: Oriel College, Oxford

Samuel Wilberforce FRS (7 September 1805 – 19 July 1873) was an English bishop in the Church of England, and the third son of William Wilberforce.

Wilberforce combined a religious vocation with significant influence in the theological, political, and scientific circles of Victorian Britain. He is regarded as one of the greatest public speakers of his day. A high church cleric, he served successively as Bishop of Oxford (1845–1869) and Bishop of Winchester (1869–1873). He is now best remembered for his opposition to Charles Darwin's theory of evolution at a debate in 1860.

== Early life ==
He was born at Clapham Common, London, the fifth child of William Wilberforce, a major campaigner against the slave trade and slavery, and Barbara Spooner; he was the younger brother of Robert Isaac Wilberforce. He had an Anglican education, outside the English public schools. This was the "private and domestic" pattern of instruction chosen for his sons by William Wilberforce. It concentrated on a traditional teaching of the classics, but in a clerical home environment.

Samuel Wilberforce was from 1812 under Stephen Langston, and then Edward Garrard Marsh. With Henry Hoare of Staplehurst and others, he was a pupil in 1819 at Stanstead Park, near Racton in Sussex, of George Hodson, at that time chaplain to Lewis Way. Hodson was tutoring Albert Way, but gathered a small class of six boys, who included also James Thomason. In 1820 Hodson moved to Maisemore near Gloucester as a curate, taking pupils with him. Wilberforce was schooled under Hodson in Gloucestershire until 1822, when he required coaching for university entrance. For that he went, with his younger brother Henry, to Francis Roach Spragge at Bidborough.

In 1823 Wilberforce entered Oriel College, Oxford. In the United Debating Society, the forerunner of the Oxford Union, he demonstrated some Whig views. His friends included William Ewart Gladstone and Henry Edward Manning, and were nicknamed the "Bethel Union" for their religiosity. Wilberforce's student recreations included riding and hunting. He graduated in 1826, taking a first-class degree in mathematics and a second in classics.

Wilberforce in late 1826 tried and failed for a fellowship at Balliol College. He spent the summer and autumn of 1827 touring the continent. He married Emily Sargent, daughter of the rector of East Lavington, West Sussex in 1828. After his marriage a college fellowship was no longer possible. He was ordained deacon in the Church of England. In 1829 he was ordained priest and appointed curate at Checkendon, near Henley-on-Thames.

== Career ==
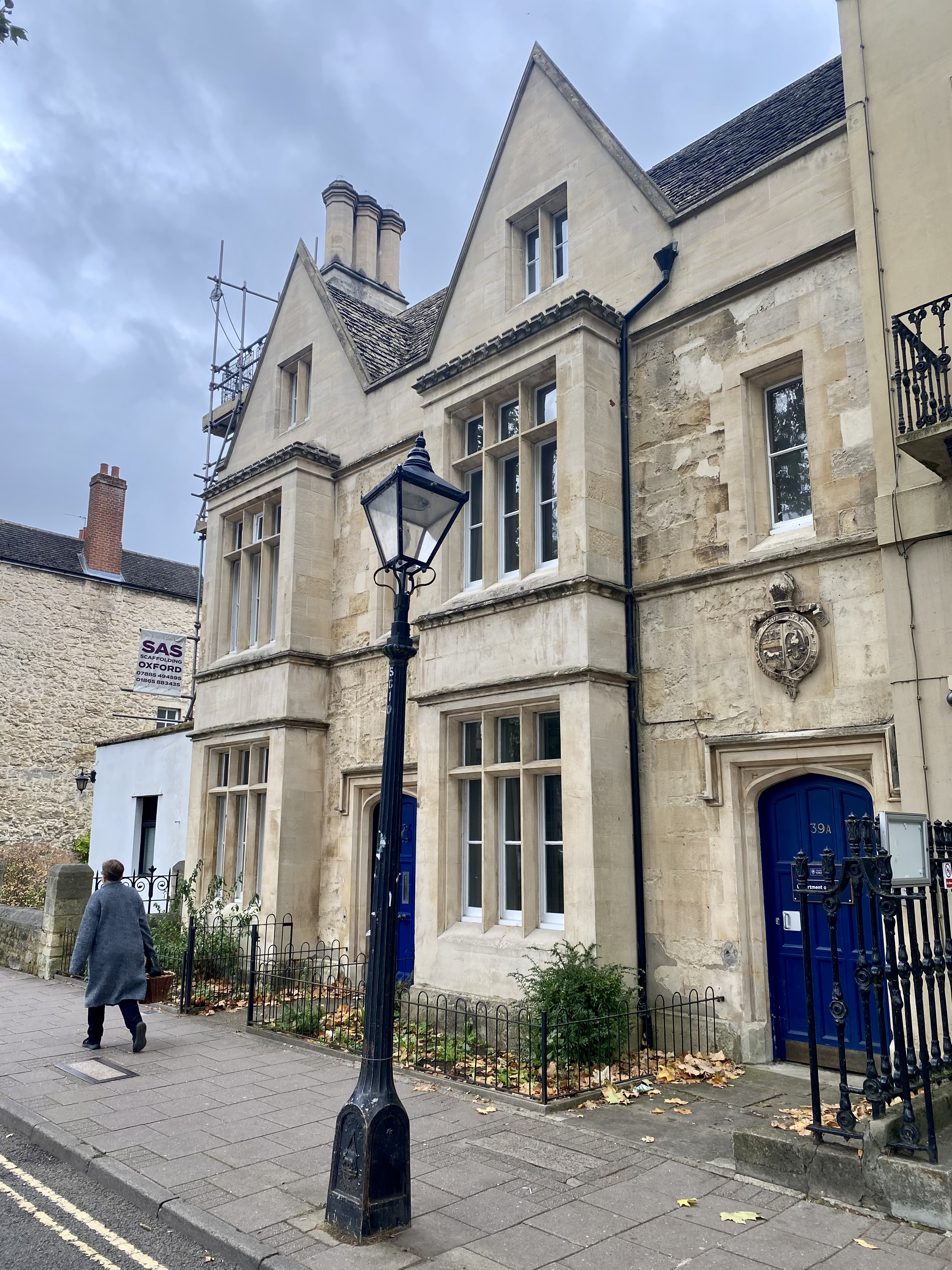
The arms of Wilberforce are displayed in a garter over the doorway of 39a St Giles in Oxford

In 1830, Wilberforce was presented by Charles Sumner, Bishop of Winchester, to the rectory of St Mary's Church, Brighstone, in the Isle of Wight. In November 1839 he was installed archdeacon of Surrey, in August 1840 he was collated canon of Winchester, and in October he accepted the rectory of Alverstoke.

In January 1841, Wilberforce was made chaplain to Prince Albert, an appointment he owed to an anti-slavery speech he had made some months previously. He was chosen as that year's Bampton lecturer, but his wife Emily died on 10 March, and he withdrew. In October 1843, he was appointed by the Archbishop of York to be sub-almoner to the Queen. Later, his part in the revival of the powers of Convocation lessened his influence at court.

In March 1845 Wilberforce accepted the position of Dean of Westminster and, in October the same year, was appointed as the Bishop of Oxford by Sir Robert Peel. This year, also, he was elected a Fellow of the Royal Society. He set up a Diocesan Church Building Fund. This gave small grants intended to act as a lever for more substantial funding from other sources, a successful fundraising approach. In 1850 Wilberforce appointed George Edmund Street as architect to the diocese of Oxford. Street built or improved 113 churches there during his tenure. In 1854, Wilberforce opened a theological college at Cuddesdon, now known as Ripon College Cuddesdon, which later was the subject of some controversy over its alleged Romanist tendencies.

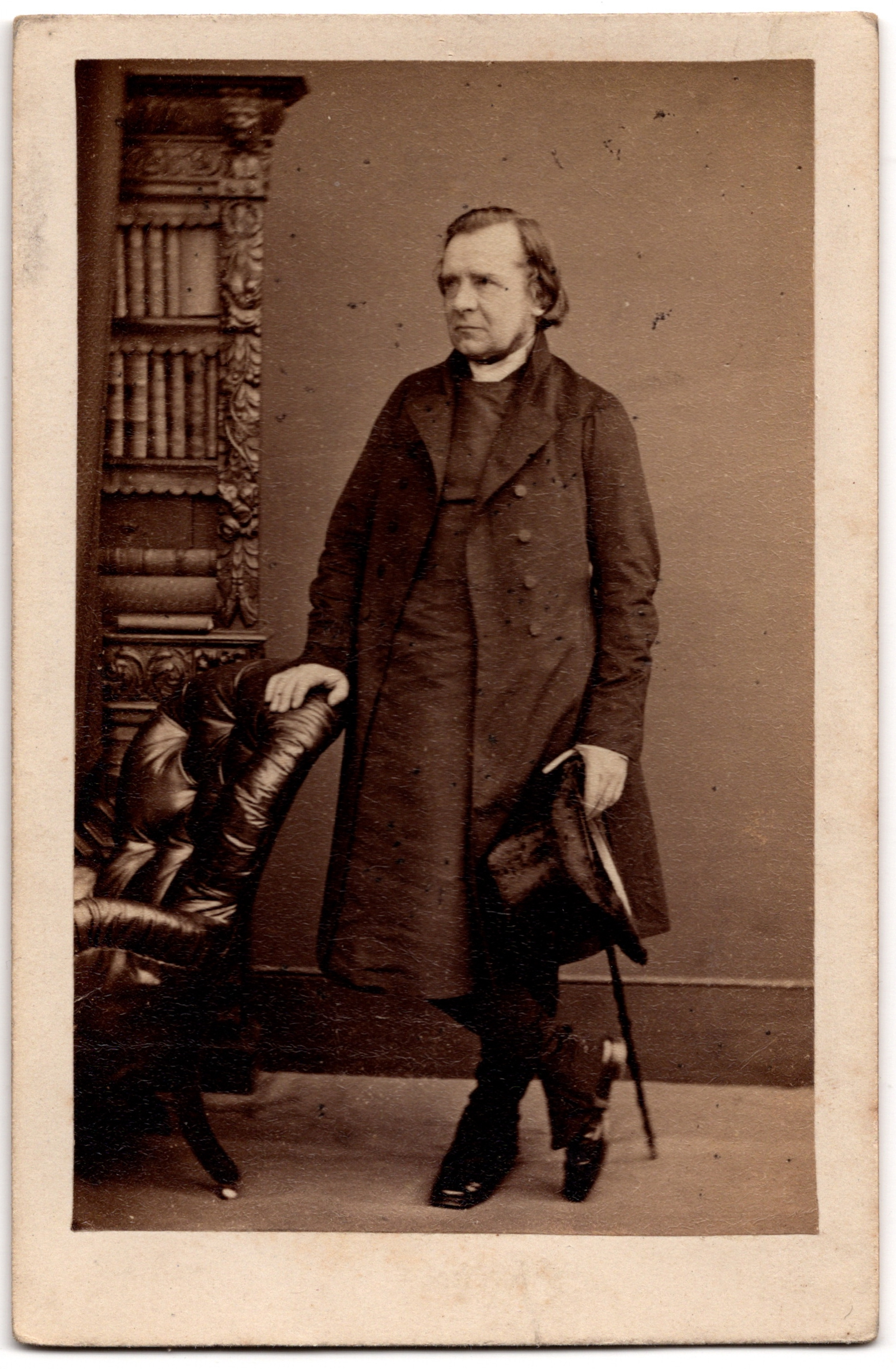
Samuel Wilberforce CDV

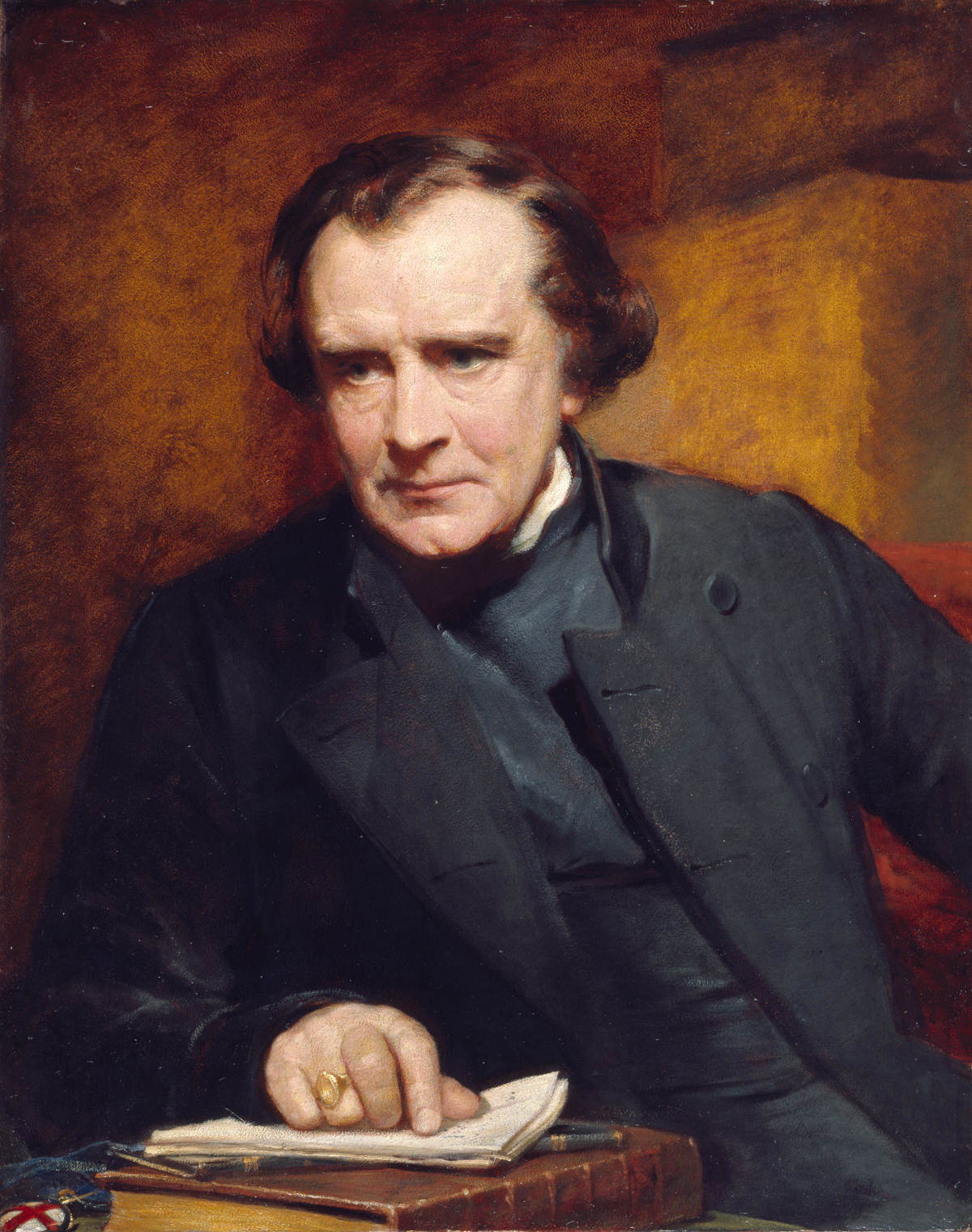
Samuel Wilberforce, painted by George Richmond, 1868

After twenty-four years in the diocese of Oxford, Wilberforce was translated by Gladstone to the bishopric of Winchester in 1869.

== Views and controversies ==
From an evangelical background and upbringing in line with Clapham Sect orthodoxy, Wilberforce began to develop into a High Churchman and High Tory in the early days of his priesthood. His ideas developed with broader contacts, and the politics of Catholic Emancipation.

=== High Churchman ===
Although a High Churchman, Wilberforce held aloof from the Oxford Movement. In 1838 his divergence from the Tractarian writers became so evident that John Henry Newman declined further contributions from him to the British Critic.

In 1847 Wilberforce, at Newman's suggestion, became involved in the Hampden controversy. He signed the remonstrance of 13 bishops to Lord John Russell against the appointment of Hampden, accused of heretical views, to the bishopric of Hereford. He wished to obtain some assurances from Hampden; unsuccessful in this, he withdrew from the suit against him. His handling of process and change of mind marred his intervention, and although he made a public statement of error, Charles Greville expressed a widely-held view that "Sly Sam" had made himself look ridiculous.

In 1850 Charles Blomfield, the Bishop of London, proposed the upper house of a revived Convocation as a court of last resort for the ecclesiastical courts of the Church of England. Wilberforce took up the suggestion, and campaigned with Henry Hoare of Staplehurst that the dormant assemblies of Convocation should be put to use. They won the argument, over a few years.

In 1867 Wilberforce framed the first Report of the Ritualistic Commission, in which coercive measures against ritualism were undermined by the use of the word "restrain" instead of "abolish" or "prohibit." He also tried to soften some resolutions of the second Ritualistic Commission in 1868, and was one of the four who signed the Report with qualifications. He was strongly opposed to the disestablishment of the Irish Church, but when the constituencies decided for it, he advised that no opposition should be made to it by the House of Lords.

=== Contra Darwin ===
Wilberforce took part in the famous 1860 debate concerning evolution at a meeting of the British Association on 30 June. Richard Owen and Thomas Henry Huxley had already clashed on man's position in nature two days previously; on the Saturday, at the Oxford University Museum of Natural History, Wilberforce got his chance to criticise Charles Darwin's On the Origin of Species by means of Natural Selection, especially the implication that humans and various species of apes share common ancestors.

In 1979, JR Lucas argued that "Wilberforce, contrary to the central tenet of the legend, did not prejudge the issue". He criticised Darwin's theory on scientific grounds, arguing that it was not supported by the facts, and he noted that the greatest names in science were opposed to the theory. Nonetheless, Wilberforce's speech is generally only remembered today for his inquiry as to whether it was through his grandmother or his grandfather that Huxley considered himself descended from a monkey. Huxley is said to have replied that he would not be ashamed to have a monkey for his ancestor, but he would be ashamed to be connected with a man who used his great gifts to obscure the truth. Darwin was not present, but several of his friends replied, with Huxley perhaps the most effective. The popular view may be that Huxley had the better of the exchange; but there is a consensus view of historians that this account of the debate involves later fabrication, and that the outcome was moot. "Reports from the time suggest that everybody enjoyed himself immensely, and all went cheerfully off to dinner together afterwards".

Wilberforce wrote a review of On the Origin of Species for the Quarterly Review. In it, he disagreed with Darwin's reasoning.

=== Essays and Reviews ===
His attitude towards Essays and Reviews in 1861, against which he wrote an article in the Quarterly Review, won Wilberforce the gratitude of the Low Churchmen.

=== Colenso controversy ===
On the publication of John William Colenso's Commentary on the Romans in 1861, Wilberforce endeavoured to induce the author to hold a private conference with him; but after the publication of the first two parts of the Pentateuch Critically Examined he drew up the address of the bishops which called on Colenso to resign his bishopric.

== Reputation ==
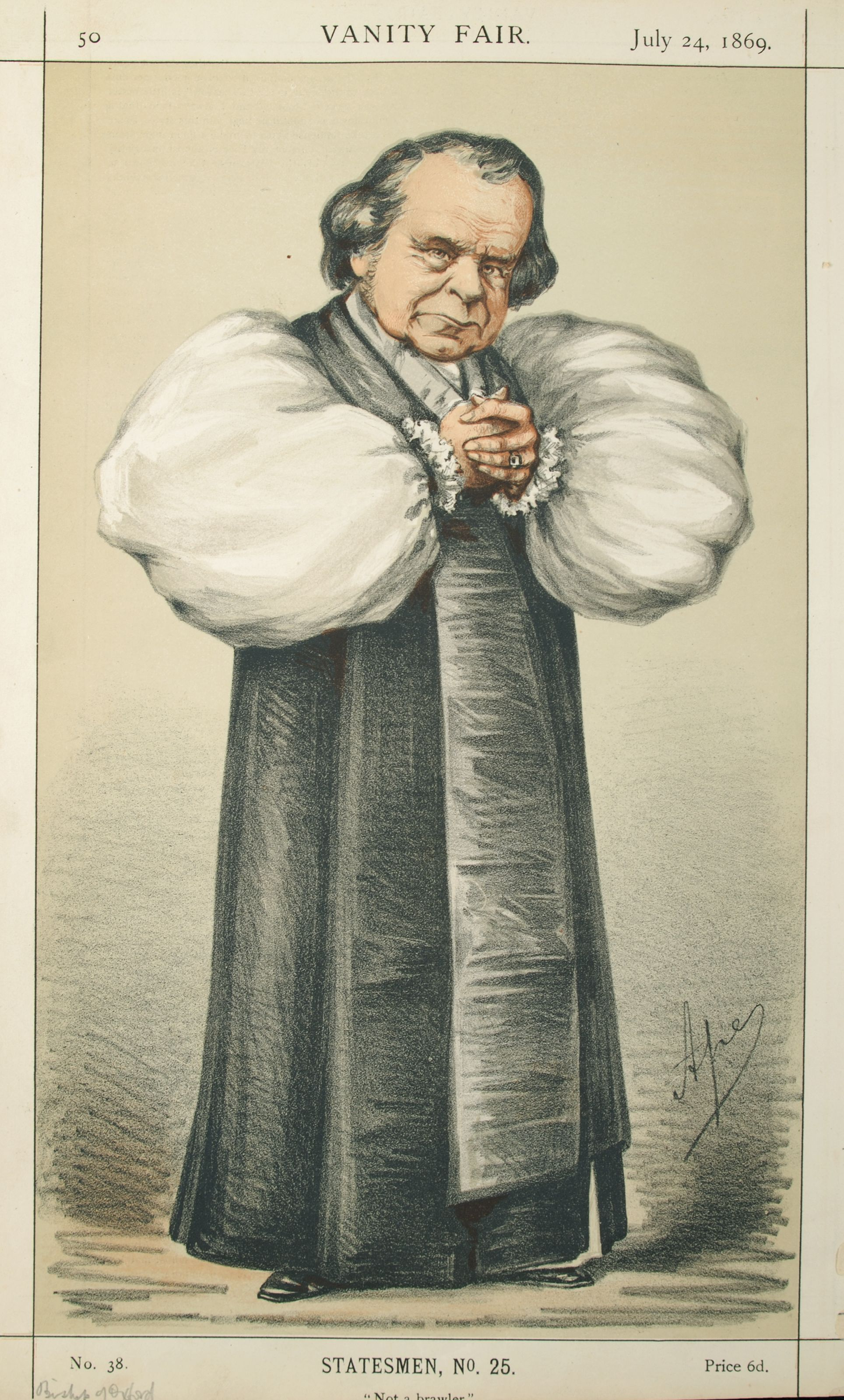
Caricature of Wilberforce in the 1860 Huxley-Wilberforce debate, published in Vanity Fair, 1869

The publication of Universalis Ecclesiae, the papal bull in 1850 re-establishing a Roman Catholic hierarchy in England, brought the High Church party, of whom Wilberforce had become a prominent member, into temporary disrepute. The secession to Catholicism of his brother-in-law Manning, and then of his brothers, as well as his only daughter and his son-in-law, brought him under suspicion.

"Soapy Sam" may have been a reference to Wilberforce's characteristic hand-washing gesture, captured in the Vanity Fair cartoon by "Ape" (illustration, right). The nickname may also derive from a comment by Benjamin Disraeli that the bishop's manner was "unctuous, oleaginous, saponaceous".

Wilberforce has been called the "bishop of society"; but society occupied only a fraction of his time. In the House of Lords he took a prominent part in the discussion of social and ecclesiastical questions.

== Death ==
Wilberforce died from a riding accident on 19 July 1873, near Abinger. He had been on the way to visit Gladstone at Holmbury St Mary, with Lord Granville. He was buried at East Lavington with his wife and her sister, the wife of Manning.

== Works ==
Wilberforce published:

- A tract on tithes (1831), "to correct the prejudices of the lower order of farmers".
- A collection of hymns for use in his parish (1832), which had a more general circulation
- Note Book of a Country Clergyman, stories
- The Apostolical Ministry, sermon.
- Letters and Journals (1837) of Henry Martyn, the Anglican missionary.
- Life (1838) of his father William Wilberforce published, with his elder brother Robert Wilberforce.
- Eucharistica (1839, editor) from the old English divines.
- Agathos and other Sunday Stories (1839)
- University Sermons (1839)
- Correspondence (1840) of William Wilberforce
- Rocky Island and other Parables (1840)
- A History of the Protestant Episcopal Church in America (1844)
- Heroes of Hebrew History (1870), originally contributed to Good Words.

There were several volumes of his sermons. He left a diary, and its content is considered influenced in parts by the editorial work he did on his father's papers, while also revealing of his own emotional life. The anonymous Britannica 1911 author wrote of it that His diary reveals a tender and devout private life which has been overlooked by those who have only considered the versatile facility and persuasive expediency that marked the successful public career of the bishop, and perhaps earned him the sobriquet of "Soapy Sam".

== Legacy ==
Wilberforce was the patron of Philip Reginald Egerton, who founded Bloxham School in Oxfordshire. A boarding house at the school is named after Wilberforce. Together with his brother Robert, he joined the Canterbury Association on 27 March 1848. He resigned from the Canterbury Association on 14 March 1849. The Wilberforce River in New Zealand was named for them.

== Family ==
Wilberforce married on 11 June 1828 Emily Sargent (1807–1841), daughter of John Sargent, and his wife Mary Smith, daughter of Abel Smith. They had five children who survived early childhood, one daughter and four sons.

- Emily Charlotte (1830–1917), the daughter, married J. Henry Pye. Pye was an Anglican priest: the couple converted to Catholicism in 1868.
- Herbert William Wilberforce (1833–1856), a lieutenant in the Royal Navy. He died at Torquay after duties in the Baltic Sea.
- Reginald Wilberforce (1838–1914), army officer. He was author of An Unrecorded Chapter of the Indian Mutiny (1894), a work criticised by fellow officers of the 52nd Foot for inaccuracy. Reginald was grandfather (through his fourth son, Samuel (Samuel Wilberforce (judge)) to Richard Lord Wilberforce, a Lord of Appeal.
- Ernest Wilberforce (1840–1908), Bishop of Newcastle-upon-Tyne from 1882 to 1895, and Bishop of Chichester from 1895 till his death.
- Basil Wilberforce (1841–1916), appointed canon residentiary of Westminster in 1894, chaplain of the House of Commons in 1896 and Archdeacon of Westminster in 1900; he published volumes of sermons.

== In literature ==
Wilberforce appears, caricatured, in Anthony Trollope's novel The Warden (1855), where he is portrayed as the third child of the Archdeacon, Dr Grantly, who is named Samuel and nicknamed Soapy, and is engaging and ingratiating but not to be trusted. He is also referenced obliquely by John Mortimer in Rumpole of the Bailey: Rumpole calls his head of chambers "Soapy Sam. He also appears in the novel "The Darwin Affair," by Tim Mason.

== Bibliography ==
- Life of Samuel Wilberforce, with Selections from his Diary and Correspondence (1879–1882), vol. i., ed. by Arthur Rawson Ashwell, and vols. ii. and iii., ed. by his son Reginald Garton Wilberforce, who also wrote a one-volume Life (1888).
- Meacham, Standish (1970). Lord Bishop: The Life of Samuel Wilberforce, 1805-1873. Harvard University Press. ISBN 9780674539136.
- One of the volumes of the "English Leaders of Religion" is devoted to him, and he is included in John William Burgon's Lives of Twelve Good Men (1888).
- Woodward, Horace B. 1907. History of the Geological Society of London. Geological Society, London, 336p
- John Hedley Brooke, "Samuel Wilberforce, Thomas Huxley, and Genesis," in Michael Lieb, Emma Mason and Jonathan Roberts (eds), The Oxford Handbook of the Reception History of the Bible (Oxford, OUP, 2011), 397–412.
- Burgon, John William: Lives of Twelve Good Men, Murray, London 1891, pp. 242–278.

Church of England titles
Preceded by Thomas Turton	Dean of Westminster; 1845	Succeeded by William Buckland
Preceded by Richard Bagot	Bishop of Oxford; 1845–1869	Succeeded by John Mackarness
Preceded by Charles Sumner	Bishop of Winchester; 1869–1873	Succeeded by Harold Browne
