= William Wilberforce =

English politician and abolitionist (1759–1833)

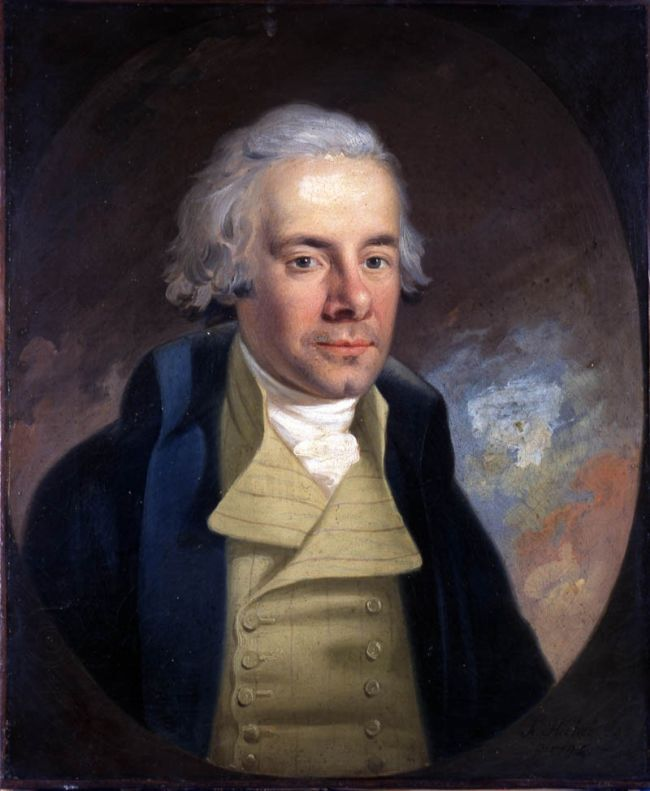
- Portrait c. 1794

Member of Parliament
- In office 31 October 1780 – February 1825
- Preceded by: David Hartley
- Succeeded by: Arthur Gough-Calthorpe
- Constituency: Kingston upon Hull (1780–1784); Yorkshire (1784–1812); Bramber (1812–1825)

Personal details
- Born: 24 August 1759 Kingston upon Hull, Yorkshire, England
- Died: 29 July 1833 (aged 73) Belgravia, London, England
- Resting place: Westminster Abbey
- Party: Independent
- Spouse: Barbara Spooner (m. 1797)
- Children: 6, including Robert, Samuel and Henry
- Education: St John's College, Cambridge
- Venerated in: Anglicanism
- Feast: 30 July

William Wilberforce (24 August 1759 – 29 July 1833) was an English politician, philanthropist, and a leader of the movement to abolish the Atlantic slave trade. A native of Kingston upon Hull, Yorkshire, he began his political career in 1780, and became an independent Member of Parliament (MP) for Yorkshire (1784–1812). In 1785, he underwent a conversion experience and became an evangelical Anglican, which resulted in major changes to his lifestyle and a lifelong concern for reform.

In 1787, Wilberforce came into contact with Thomas Clarkson and a group of activists against the transatlantic slave trade, including Granville Sharp, Hannah More and Charles Middleton. They persuaded Wilberforce to take on the cause of abolition, and he became a leading English abolitionist. He headed the parliamentary campaign against the British slave trade for 20 years until the passage of the Slave Trade Act 1807.

Wilberforce was convinced of the importance of religion, morality and education. He championed causes and campaigns such as the Society for the Suppression of Vice, British missionary work in India, the creation of a free colony in Sierra Leone, the foundation of the Church Mission Society and the Society for the Prevention of Cruelty to Animals. His underlying conservatism led him to support politically and socially repressive legislation, and resulted in criticism that he was ignoring injustices at home while campaigning for the enslaved abroad.

In later years, Wilberforce supported the campaign for the complete abolition of slavery and continued his involvement after 1826, when he resigned from Parliament because of his failing health. That campaign led to the Slavery Abolition Act 1833, which abolished slavery in most of the British Empire. Wilberforce died three days after hearing that the passage of the act through Parliament was assured. He was buried in Westminster Abbey.

== Early life and education ==
Wilberforce was born in Hull, in Yorkshire, England, on 24 August 1759. He was the only son of Robert Wilberforce, a wealthy merchant, and his wife, Elizabeth Bird. His grandfather, William, had made the family fortune in the maritime trade with Baltic countries, (Note: Lead, cotton, tools and cutlery were among the more frequent exports from Hull to the Baltic countries, with timber, iron ore, yarns, hemp, wine and manufactured goods being imported to Britain on the return journey.) and was twice elected mayor of Hull.

Wilberforce was a small, sickly child with poor eyesight. In 1767, he began attending Hull Grammar School, which at the time was headed by Joseph Milner, who would become a lifelong friend. Wilberforce profited from the supportive atmosphere at the school, until his father died in 1768. With his mother struggling to cope, the nine-year-old Wilberforce was sent to a prosperous uncle and aunt with houses in both St James's Place, London, and Wimbledon. He attended an "indifferent" boarding school in Putney for two years and spent his holidays in Wimbledon, where he grew extremely fond of his relatives. He became interested in evangelical Christianity due to his relatives' influence, especially that of his aunt Hannah, sister of the wealthy merchant John Thornton, a philanthropist and a supporter of the leading Methodist preacher, George Whitefield.

Wilberforce's staunchly Church of England mother and grandfather, alarmed at these nonconformist influences and at his leanings towards evangelicalism, brought the 12-year-old boy back to Hull in 1771. Wilberforce was heartbroken at being separated from his aunt and uncle. His family opposed a return to Hull Grammar School because the headmaster had become a Methodist, and Wilberforce continued his education at Pocklington School from 1771 to 1776. Influenced by Methodist scruples, he initially resisted Hull's lively social life, but, as his religious fervour diminished, he embraced theatre-going, attended balls, and played cards.

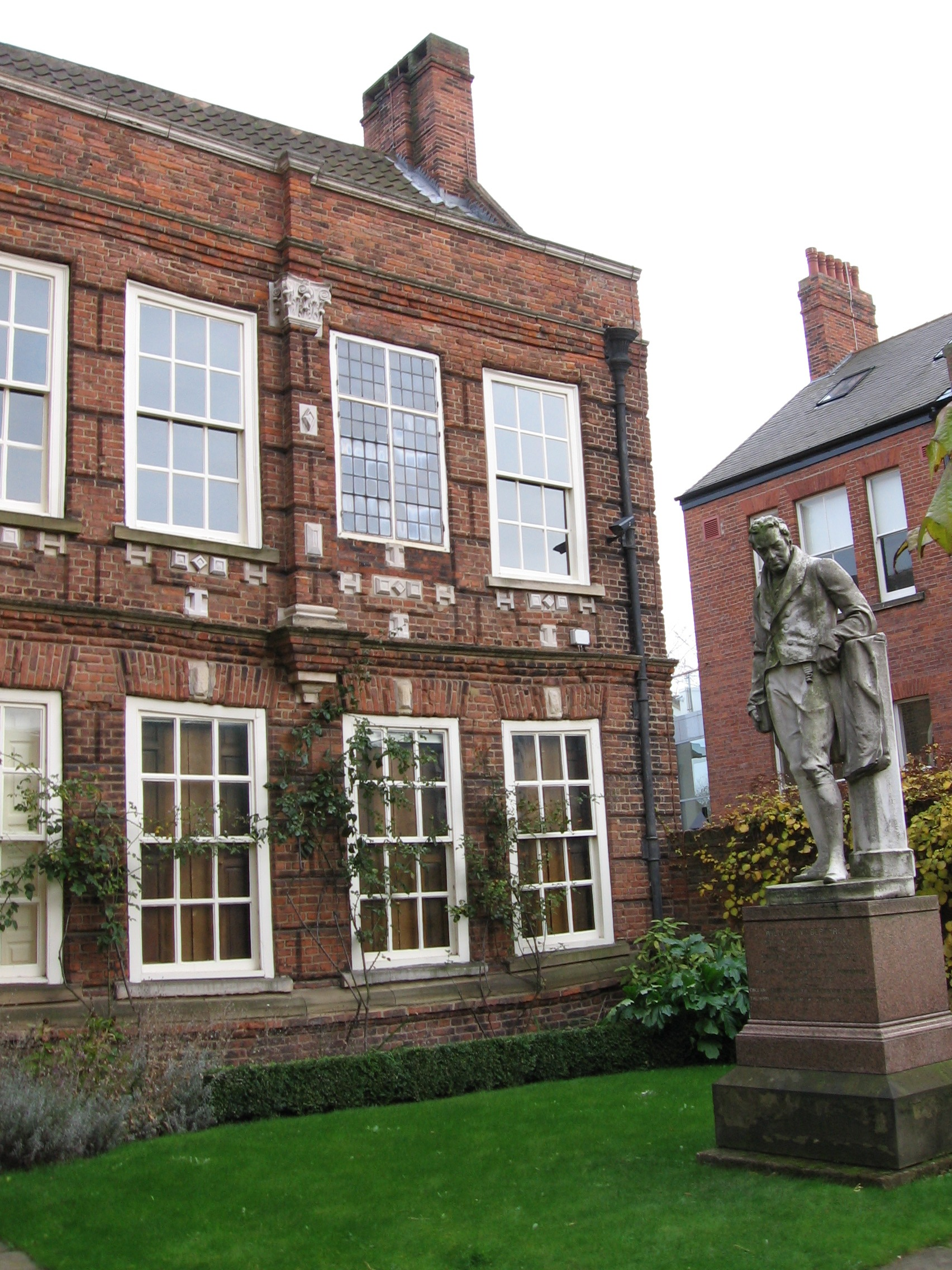
A statue of William Wilberforce outside Wilberforce House, his birthplace in Hull

In October 1776, at the age of seventeen, Wilberforce matriculated at St John's College, Cambridge. The deaths of his grandfather and uncle, in 1774 and 1777 respectively, had left him independently wealthy and as a result he had little inclination or need to apply himself to serious study. Instead, he immersed himself in the social round of student life and pursued a hedonistic lifestyle, enjoying cards, gambling and late-night drinking sessions – although he found the excesses of some of his fellow students distasteful. Fellow students described Wilberforce as witty, generous, and an excellent conversationalist. He made many friends, including the more studious future Prime Minister William Pitt. Despite his lifestyle and lack of interest in studying, he managed to pass his examinations and was awarded a Bachelor of Arts degree in 1781 and a Master of Arts degree in 1788.

== Early parliamentary career ==
Wilberforce began to consider a political career while still at university, and during the winter of 1779–1780, he and Pitt frequently watched House of Commons debates from the gallery. Pitt, already set on a political career, encouraged Wilberforce to join him in obtaining a parliamentary seat. In September 1780, at the age of 21 and while still a student, Wilberforce was elected Member of Parliament for Kingston upon Hull, spending over £8,000, as was the custom of the time, to ensure he received the necessary votes. Free from financial pressures, Wilberforce sat as an independent, resolving to be "no party man". Criticised at times for inconsistency, he supported both Tory and Whig governments according to his conscience, working closely with the party in power, and voting on specific measures according to their merits.

Wilberforce attended Parliament regularly, but he also maintained a lively social life, becoming an habitué of gentlemen's gambling clubs such as Goostree's and Boodle's in Pall Mall, London. The writer and socialite Madame de Staël described him as the "wittiest man in England" and, according to Georgiana, Duchess of Devonshire, the Prince of Wales said that he would go anywhere to hear Wilberforce sing. Wilberforce used his speaking voice to great effect in political speeches; the diarist and author James Boswell witnessed Wilberforce's eloquence in the House of Commons and noted, "I saw what seemed a mere shrimp mount upon the table; but as I listened, he grew, and grew, until the shrimp became a whale."

During the frequent government changes between 1781 and 1784, Wilberforce supported his friend Pitt in parliamentary debates. In autumn 1783, Pitt, Wilberforce and Edward Eliot travelled to France for a six-week holiday together. After a difficult start in Rheims, where their presence aroused police suspicion that they were English spies, they visited Paris, meeting Benjamin Franklin, General Lafayette, Marie Antoinette and Louis XVI, and joined the French court at Fontainebleau.

Pitt became Prime Minister in December 1783, with Wilberforce a key supporter of his minority government. Despite their close friendship, there is no record that Pitt offered Wilberforce a ministerial position in this or future governments. This may have been due to Wilberforce's wish to remain an independent MP. Alternatively, Wilberforce's frequent tardiness and disorganisation, as well as his chronic eye problems that at times made reading impossible, may have convinced Pitt that he was not ministerial material. When Parliament was dissolved in the spring of 1784, Wilberforce decided to stand as a candidate for the county of Yorkshire in the 1784 general election. On 6 April, he was returned as MP for Yorkshire at the age of twenty-four.

=== Conversion ===
In October 1784, Wilberforce embarked upon a tour of Europe with his mother, sister and Isaac Milner, the younger brother of his former headmaster. They visited the French Riviera and had dinners, played cards, and gambled. In February 1785, Wilberforce returned to London temporarily, to support Pitt's proposals for parliamentary reforms. He rejoined the party in Genoa, Italy, and they continued their tour to Switzerland. Milner accompanied Wilberforce to England, and on the journey they read "The Rise and Progress of Religion in the Soul" by Philip Doddridge, a leading early 18th-century English nonconformist.

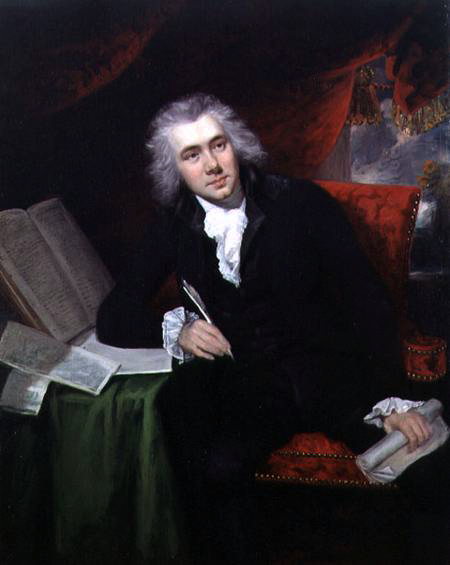
William Wilberforce by John Rising, 1790, pictured at the age of 30

Wilberforce's spiritual journey is thought to have changed course at this time. He started to rise early to read the Bible and pray and kept a private journal. He underwent an evangelical conversion, regretting his past life and resolving to commit his future life and work to the service of God. His conversion changed some of his habits, but not his nature: he remained outwardly cheerful, interested and respectful, tactfully urging others towards his new faith. Inwardly, he became self-critical, harshly judging his spirituality, use of time, vanity, self-control and relationships with others.

At the time, religious enthusiasm was generally regarded as a social transgression and was stigmatised in polite society. Evangelicals in the upper classes were exposed to contempt and ridicule, and Wilberforce's conversion led him to question whether he should remain in public life. He sought guidance from John Newton, a leading evangelical Anglican clergyman of the day and Rector of St Mary Woolnoth. Both counselled him to remain in politics, and he resolved to do so "with increased diligence and conscientiousness". His political views were informed by his faith and by his desire to promote Christianity and Christian ethics in private and public life. His views were often deeply conservative, opposed to radical changes in a God-given political and social order, and focused on issues such as the observance of the Sabbath and the eradication of immorality through education and reform. He was often distrusted by progressive voices because of his conservatism, and regarded with suspicion by many Tories who saw evangelicals as radicals who wanted the overthrow of church and state.

In 1786, Wilberforce leased a house in Old Palace Yard, Westminster, in order to be near the houses of Parliament. He began using his parliamentary position to advocate reform by introducing a Registration Bill, proposing limited changes to parliamentary election procedures. In response to the need for bodies for dissection by surgeons, he brought forward a bill to extend the measure permitting the dissection after execution of criminals such as rapists, arsonists, burglars and violent robbers. The bill also advocated the reduction of sentences for women convicted of treason, a crime that at the time included a husband's murder. The House of Commons passed both bills, but they were defeated in the House of Lords.

== Abolition of the transatlantic slave trade ==
=== Initial decision ===
The English began to trade in enslaved people when Queen Elizabeth I licensed John Hawkins to do so. He robbed Portuguese ships and transported West Africans to be sold in the West Indies. By 1783, the triangular route that took British-made goods to Africa to buy slaves, transported the enslaved to the West Indies, and then brought slave-grown products such as sugar, tobacco, and cotton to Britain, represented about 80 percent of Great Britain's foreign income. British ships dominated the slave trade, supplying French, Spanish, Dutch, Portuguese and British colonies, and in peak years carried forty thousand enslaved men, women and children across the Atlantic in the horrific conditions of the middle passage. Of the estimated 11 million Africans transported into slavery, about 1.4 million died during the voyage.

The British campaign to abolish the slave trade is generally considered to have begun in the 1780s with the establishment of the Quakers' anti-slavery committees, and their presentation to Parliament of the first slave trade petition in 1783. The same year, Wilberforce, while dining with his Cambridge friend Gerard Edwards, met Rev. James Ramsay, a ship's surgeon who had become a clergyman and medical supervisor on the island of St Christopher (later St Kitts). Ramsay was horrified by the conditions endured by the enslaved peoples, both at sea and on the plantations and returned to England and joined abolitionist movements. Wilberforce did not follow up on his meeting with Ramsay, but three years later, inspired by his new faith, Wilberforce became interested in humanitarian reform. In November 1786, he received a letter from Sir Charles Middleton that re-opened his interest in the slave trade. Middleton suggested that Wilberforce bring forward the abolition of the slave trade in Parliament. Wilberforce responded that he "felt the great importance of the subject, and thought himself unequal to the task allotted to him, but yet would not positively decline it". He began to read widely on the subject and met with a group of abolitionists called the Testonites at Middleton's home in the early winter of 1786–1787.

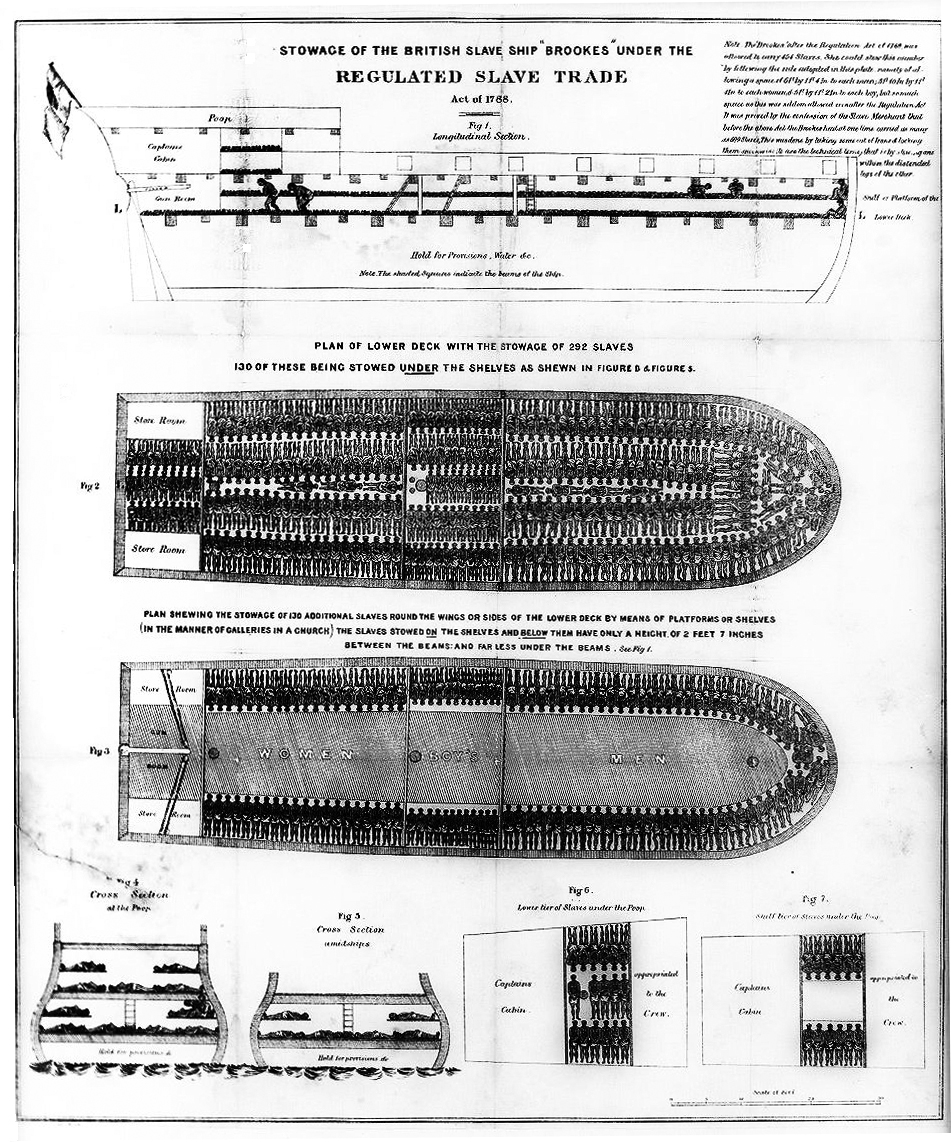
Diagram of a slave ship, the Brookes, illustrating how slaves were transported

In early 1787, Thomas Clarkson met with Wilberforce for the first time at Old Palace Yard and brought a copy of his essay on the subject. Clarkson visited Wilberforce weekly, bringing first-hand evidence he had obtained about the slave trade. The Quakers, already working for abolition, recognised the need for influence within Parliament, and urged Clarkson to secure a commitment from Wilberforce to bring forward the case for abolition in the House of Commons. It was arranged that Bennet Langton, a Lincolnshire landowner and mutual acquaintance of Wilberforce and Clarkson, would organise a dinner party on 13 March 1787 to ask Wilberforce formally to lead the parliamentary campaign. By the end of the evening, Wilberforce had agreed in general terms that he would bring forward the abolition of the slave trade in Parliament, "provided that no person more proper could be found".

The same spring, on 12 May 1787, the still hesitant Wilberforce held a conversation with William Pitt and the future Prime Minister William Grenville as they sat under a large oak tree on Pitt's estate in Kent. Under what came to be known as the "Wilberforce Oak" at Holwood House, Pitt challenged his friend to give notice of a motion concerning the slave trade before another parliamentarian did. Wilberforce's response is not recorded, but he later declared this was when he decided to bring forward the motion.

=== Early parliamentary action ===
Wilberforce had planned to introduce a motion giving notice that he would bring forward a bill for the Abolition of the Slave Trade during the 1789 parliamentary session. However, in January 1788, he was taken ill with a probable stress-related condition, now thought to be ulcerative colitis. It was several months before he was able to resume work, and he spent time convalescing at Bath and Cambridge. His regular bouts of gastrointestinal illnesses precipitated the use of moderate quantities of opium, which proved effective in alleviating his condition, and which he continued to use for the rest of his life. In Wilberforce's absence, Pitt, who had long been supportive of abolition, introduced the preparatory motion himself, and ordered a Privy Council investigation into the slave trade, followed by a House of Commons review.

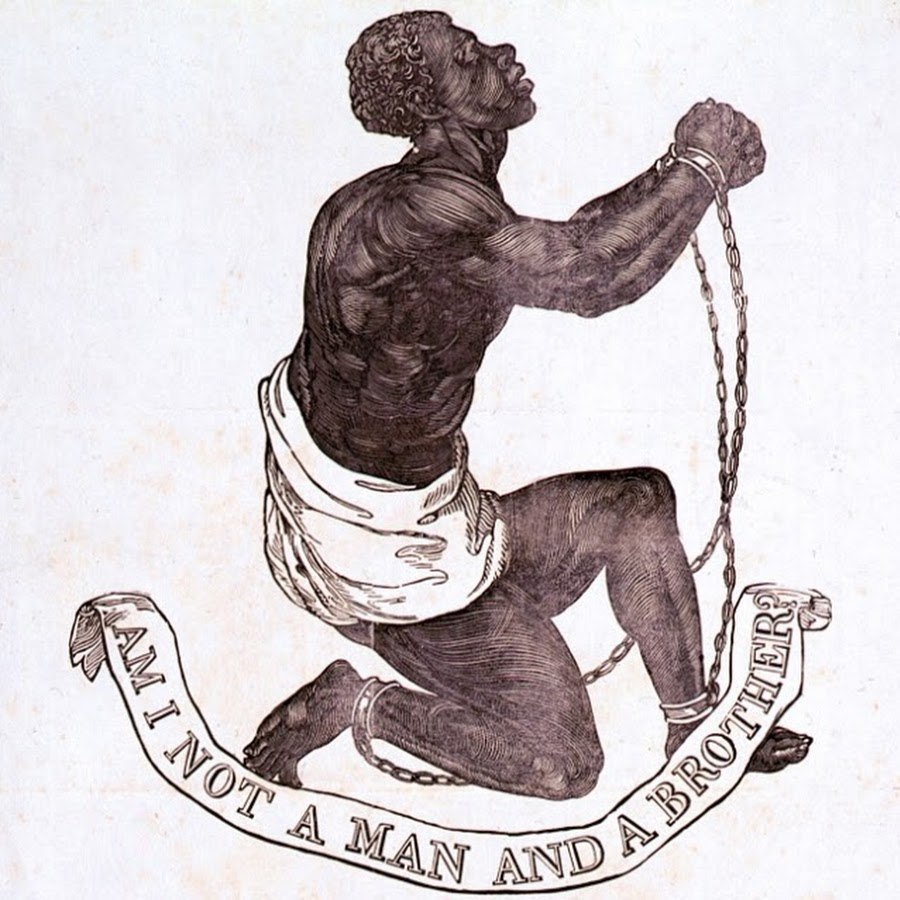
"Am I Not a Man and a Brother?" Medallion created as part of anti-slavery campaign by Josiah Wedgwood, 1787

With the publication of the Privy Council report in April 1789 and following months of planning, Wilberforce commenced his parliamentary campaign. On 12 May 1789, he made his first major speech on the subject of abolition in the House of Commons, in which he reasoned that the trade was morally reprehensible and an issue of natural justice. Drawing on Thomas Clarkson's mass of evidence, he described in detail the appalling conditions in which enslaved people travelled from Africa in the middle passage and argued that abolishing the trade would also bring an improvement to the conditions of existing slaves in the West Indies. He moved twelve resolutions condemning the slave trade, but did not refer to the abolition of slavery itself, instead dwelling on the potential for reproduction in the existing slave population should the trade be abolished. In particular, when discussing the abolition of slavery, Wilberforce criticised the idea of Negro inferiority. With several parliamentarians signalling support for the bill, the opponents of abolition delayed the vote by proposing that the House of Commons hear its own evidence; Wilberforce, in a decision that has been criticised for prolonging the slave trade, reluctantly agreed. The hearings were not completed by the end of the parliamentary session and were deferred until the following year. In the meantime, Wilberforce and Clarkson tried unsuccessfully to take advantage of the egalitarian atmosphere of the French Revolution to press for France's abolition of the trade. In January 1790, Wilberforce succeeded in speeding up the hearings by gaining approval for a smaller parliamentary select committee to consider the vast quantity of evidence which had been accumulated. Wilberforce's house in Old Palace Yard became a centre for the abolitionists' campaign and the location for many strategy meetings. Petitioners for other causes also besieged him there.

Let us not despair; it is a blessed cause, and success, ere long, will crown our exertions. Already we have gained one victory; we have obtained, for these poor creatures, the recognition of their human nature, which, for a while was most shamefully denied. This is the first fruits of our efforts; let us persevere and our triumph will be complete. Never, never will we desist till we have wiped away this scandal from the Christian name, released ourselves from the load of guilt, under which we at present labour, and extinguished every trace of this bloody traffic, of which our posterity, looking back to the history of these enlightened times, will scarce believe that it has been suffered to exist so long a disgrace and dishonour to this country.

— William Wilberforce — speech before the House of Commons, 18 April 1791

Interrupted by a general election in June 1790, the committee finished hearing witnesses and in April 1791, with a closely reasoned four-hour speech, Wilberforce introduced the first parliamentary bill to abolish the slave trade. After two evenings of debate, the bill was easily defeated by 163 votes to 88, as the political climate having swung in a conservative direction after the French Revolution and in reaction to an increase in radicalism and to slave revolts in the French West Indies.

A protracted parliamentary campaign to abolish slavery continued, and Wilberforce remained committed to this cause despite frustration and hostility. He was supported by fellow members of the Clapham Sect, among whom was his best friend and cousin Henry Thornton. Wilberforce accepted an invitation to share a house with Henry Thornton in 1792, moving into his own home after Thornton's marriage in 1796.

Wilberforce, the Clapham Sect and others were anxious to demonstrate that Africans, and particularly freed slaves, had human and economic abilities beyond the slave trade and capable of sustaining a well-ordered society, trade and cultivation. Inspired in part by the utopian vision of Granville Sharp, they became involved in the establishment in 1792 of a free colony in Sierra Leone with black settlers from Britain, Nova Scotia and Jamaica, as well as native Africans and some whites. They formed the Sierra Leone Company, with Wilberforce subscribing liberally to the project in money and time.

On 2 April 1792, Wilberforce brought another bill calling for abolition of the slave trade. Henry Dundas, as Home Secretary, proposed a compromise solution of gradual abolition of the trade over several years. This was passed by 230 to 85 votes, but Wilberforce believed that it was little more than a clever ploy to ensure that total abolition would be delayed indefinitely.

=== War with France ===
On 26 February 1793, another vote to abolish the slave trade was narrowly defeated by eight votes. The outbreak of war with France the same month prevented further consideration of the issue, as politicians concentrated on the national crisis and the threat of invasion. The same year, and again in 1794, Wilberforce unsuccessfully brought before Parliament a bill to outlaw British ships from supplying enslaved people to foreign colonies. He voiced his concern about the war and urged Pitt and his government to make greater efforts to end hostilities. Growing more alarmed, on 31 December 1794, Wilberforce moved that the government seek a peaceful resolution with France, a stance that created a temporary breach in his long friendship with Pitt.

Abolition continued to be associated in the public consciousness with the French Revolution and with British radical groups, resulting in a decline in public support. Despite this, Wilberforce continued to introduce abolition bills throughout the 1790s.

The early years of the 19th century saw an increased public interest in abolition. In June 1804, Wilberforce's bill to abolish the slave trade successfully passed all its stages through the House of Commons. However, it was too late in the parliamentary session for it to complete its passage through the House of Lords. On its reintroduction during the 1805 session, it was defeated, with even the usually sympathetic Pitt failing to support it. On this occasion and throughout the campaign, abolition was held back by Wilberforce's trusting, even credulous nature, and his deferential attitude towards those in power. He found it difficult to believe that men of rank would not do what he perceived to be the right thing, and was reluctant to confront them when they did not.

=== Final phase of the campaign ===
The House of Commons in Wilberforce's day by Augustus Pugin and Thomas Rowlandson (1808–1811)

Following Pitt's death in January 1806, Wilberforce increased his collaboration with the Whigs, especially the abolitionists. He gave general support to the Grenville–Fox administration, which brought more abolitionists into the cabinet; Wilberforce and Charles Fox led the campaign in the House of Commons.

A radical change of tactics, which involved the introduction of a bill to ban British subjects from aiding or participating in the slave trade to the French colonies, was suggested by the maritime lawyer James Stephen. A bill was introduced and approved by the cabinet, and Wilberforce and other abolitionists maintained a self-imposed silence, so as not to draw any attention to the effect of the bill. The approach was successful and the Foreign Slave Trade Bill received royal assent on 23 May 1806. Wilberforce and Clarkson collected a large volume of evidence against the slave trade over the previous two decades, and Wilberforce spent the latter part of 1806 writing A Letter on the Abolition of the Slave Trade, which was a comprehensive restatement of the abolitionists' case.

Wilberforce was re-elected as an MP for Yorkshire in the 1806 United Kingdom general election, after which he returned to finishing and publishing his Letter, a 400-page book which formed the basis for the final phase of the campaign. Lord Grenville, the Prime Minister, successfully introduced an Abolition Bill in the House of Lords first, then Charles Grey moved for a second reading in the Commons on 23 February 1807. As tributes were made to Wilberforce, whose face streamed with tears, the bill was carried by 283 votes to 16. Excited supporters suggested taking advantage of the large majority to seek the abolition of slavery itself, but Wilberforce made it clear that total emancipation was not the immediate goal.

== Personal life ==
In his youth, William Wilberforce showed little interest in women, but when he was in his late thirties his friend Thomas Babington recommended 25-year-old Barbara Ann Spooner as a potential bride. Wilberforce met her two days later on 15 April 1797, and was immediately smitten; following an eight-day whirlwind romance, he proposed. Despite the urgings of friends to slow down, the couple married at the Church of St Swithin in Bath, Somerset, on 30 May 1797.

They were devoted to each other, and Barbara was very attentive and supportive to Wilberforce in his increasing ill health, though she showed little interest in his political activities. They had six children in fewer than ten years: William (born 1798), Barbara (born 1799), Elizabeth (born 1801), Robert (born 1802), Samuel (born 1805) and Henry (born 1807). Wilberforce was an indulgent and adoring father who revelled in his time at home and at play with his children.

== Other concerns ==
=== Political and social reform ===
Wilberforce was highly conservative on many political and social issues. He advocated change in society through Christianity and improvement in morals, education and religion, fearing and opposing radical causes and revolution. The radical writer William Cobbett was among those who attacked what they saw as Wilberforce's hypocrisy in campaigning for better working conditions for enslaved people while British workers lived in terrible conditions at home. Critics noted Wilberforce's support of the suspension of habeas corpus in 1795 and his votes for Pitt's "Gagging Bills", which banned meetings of more than 50 people, allowing speakers to be arrested and imposing harsh penalties on those who attacked the constitution.

Wilberforce was opposed to giving workers' rights to organise into unions, in 1799 speaking in favour of the Combination Act, which suppressed trade union activity throughout Britain, and calling unions "a general disease in our society". He also opposed an enquiry into the 1819 Peterloo Massacre in which eleven protesters were killed at a political rally demanding reform. Concerned about "bad men who wished to produce anarchy and confusion", he approved of the government's Six Acts, which further limited public meetings and seditious writings. Wilberforce's actions led the essayist William Hazlitt to condemn him as one "who preaches vital Christianity to untutored savages, and tolerates its worst abuses in civilised states."

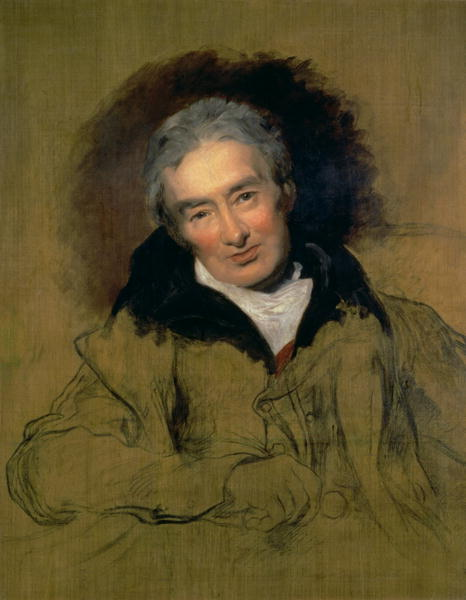
William Wilberforce, an unfinished portrait by Sir Thomas Lawrence, 1828

Wilberforce's views of women and religion were also conservative. He disapproved of women anti-slavery activists such as Elizabeth Heyrick, who organised women's abolitionist groups in the 1820s, protesting: "[F]or ladies to meet, to publish, to go from house to house stirring up petitions—these appear to me proceedings unsuited to the female character as delineated in Scripture." Wilberforce initially strongly opposed bills for Catholic emancipation, which would have allowed Catholics to become MPs, hold public office and serve in the army, although by 1813, he had changed his views and spoke in favour of a similar bill.

Wilberforce advocated for legislation to improve the working conditions for chimney-sweeps and textile workers, engaged in prison reform, and supported campaigns to restrict capital punishment and the severe punishments meted out under the Game laws. He recognised the importance of education in alleviating poverty, and when Hannah More and her sister established Sunday schools for the poor in Somerset and the Mendips, he provided financial and moral support as they faced opposition from landowners and Anglican clergy.

From the late 1780s onward, Wilberforce campaigned for limited parliamentary reform, such as the abolition of rotten boroughs and the redistribution of Commons seats to growing towns and cities, though by 1832, he feared that such measures went too far. With others, Wilberforce founded the world's first animal welfare organisation, the Society for the Prevention of Cruelty to Animals (later the Royal Society for the Prevention of Cruelty to Animals). He was also opposed to duelling, which he described as the "disgrace of a Christian society" and was appalled when his friend Pitt engaged in a duel with George Tierney in 1798, particularly as it occurred on a Sunday, the Christian day of rest.

Wilberforce was generous with his time and money, believing that those with wealth had a duty to give a significant portion of their income to the needy. Yearly, he gave away thousands of pounds, much of it to clergymen to distribute in their parishes. He paid off the debts of others, supported education and missions, and in a year of food shortages, gave to charity more than his own yearly income. He was exceptionally hospitable, and could not bear to sack any of his servants. As a result, his home was full of old and incompetent servants kept on in charity. Although he was often months behind in his correspondence, Wilberforce responded to numerous requests for advice or for help in obtaining professorships, military promotions and livings for clergymen, or for the reprieve of death sentences.

=== Evangelical Christianity ===
A supporter of the evangelical wing of the Church of England, Wilberforce believed that the revitalisation of the church and individual Christian observance would lead to a harmonious, moral society. He sought to elevate the status of religion in public and private life, making piety fashionable in both the upper- and middle-classes of society. To this end, in April 1797, Wilberforce published A Practical View of the Prevailing Religious System of Professed Christians in the Higher and Middle Classes of This Country Contrasted With Real Christianity, on which he had been working since 1793. This was an exposition of New Testament doctrine and teachings and a call for a revival of Christianity, as a response to the moral decline of the nation, illustrating his own testimony and the views which inspired him. The book was influential and a best-seller; 7,500 copies were sold within six months, and it was translated into several languages.

Wilberforce fostered and supported missionary activity in Britain and abroad, and was involved with other members of the Clapham Sect in various evangelical and charitable organisations. He was a founding member of the Church Missionary Society (since renamed the Church Mission Society) and an early vice-president of the London Society for promoting Christianity among the Jews (later the Church's Ministry Among Jewish People). Horrified by the lack of Christian evangelism in India, Wilberforce used the 1793 renewal of the British East India Company's charter to propose the addition of clauses requiring the company to provide teachers and chaplains and to commit to the "religious improvement" of Indians. The plan was unsuccessful due to lobbying by the directors of the company, who feared that their commercial interests would be damaged.

In 1813, Wilberforce tried again to pass legislation mandating the commitment "religious improvement" when the charter came up for renewal. Using petitions, meetings, lobbying and letter writing, he successfully campaigned for changes to the charter. Speaking in favour of the Charter Act 1813, he criticised the East India Company and their rule in India for its hypocrisy and racial prejudice, while also condemning aspects of Hinduism including the caste system, infanticide, polygamy and sati.

=== Moral reform ===
Greatly concerned by what he perceived to be the degeneracy of British society, Wilberforce was active in matters of moral reform, lobbying against "the torrent of profaneness that every day makes more rapid advances", and considered this issue and the abolition of the slave trade as equally important goals. At the suggestion of Wilberforce and Bishop Porteus, King George III was requested by the Archbishop of Canterbury to issue in 1787 A Proclamation for the Encouragement of Piety and Virtue, as a remedy for the rising tide of immorality. The proclamation commanded the prosecution of those guilty of "excessive drinking, blasphemy, profane swearing and cursing, lewdness, profanation of the Lord's Day, and other dissolute, immoral, or disorderly practices". Greeted largely with public indifference, Wilberforce sought to increase its impact by mobilising public figures to the cause, and by founding the Society for the Suppression of Vice. This and other societies in which Wilberforce was a prime mover, mustered support for the prosecution of those who had been charged with violating relevant laws, including brothel keepers, distributors of pornographic material, and those who did not respect the Sabbath.

The writer and clergyman Sydney Smith criticised Wilberforce for being more interested in the sins of the poor than those of the rich, and suggested that a better name would be the "Society for suppressing the vices of persons whose income does not exceed £500 per annum". Wilberforce's attempts to legislate against adultery and Sunday newspapers were also in vain; his involvement and leadership in other, less punitive, approaches were more successful in the long-term, however. By the end of his life, British morals, manners, and sense of social responsibility had increased, paving the way for future changes in societal conventions and attitudes during the Victorian era.

=== Emancipation of enslaved Africans ===
Wilberforce worked with the members of the African Institution to ensure the enforcement of the abolition of the slave trade and to promote abolitionist negotiations with other countries. In particular, the United States had abolished the slave trade after 1808 and Wilberforce lobbied the American government to enforce its own mandated prohibition more strongly. The same year, Wilberforce moved his family from Clapham to a sizeable mansion with a large garden in Kensington Gore, closer to the Houses of Parliament. In worsening health by 1812, Wilberforce resigned his Yorkshire seat, and became MP for the rotten borough of Bramber in Sussex, a seat with little or no constituency obligations, thus allowing him more time for his family and the causes that interested him.

From 1816, Wilberforce introduced a series of bills which would require the compulsory registration of enslaved people, together with details of their country of origin, permitting the illegal importation of foreign slaves to be detected. Later in 1816 he began to publicly denounce slavery itself, though he did not demand immediate emancipation, believing incremental change to be more effective in achieving abolition.

In 1820, after a period of poor health and with his eyesight failing, Wilberforce further limited public activities, although he became embroiled in unsuccessful mediation attempts between King George IV, and his estranged wife Caroline of Brunswick, who had sought her rights as queen of the realm. Wilberforce still hoped "to lay a foundation for some future measures for the emancipation of the poor slaves". Aware that the cause would need younger men to continue the work, in 1821 he asked MP Thomas Fowell Buxton to take over leadership of the campaign in the Commons. As the 1820s continued, Wilberforce increasingly became more of a figurehead for the abolitionist movement, although he continued to appear at anti-slavery meetings, welcoming visitors, and maintaining a busy correspondence on the subject.

In 1823, Wilberforce's 56-page "Appeal to the Religion, Justice and Humanity of the Inhabitants of the British Empire in Behalf of the Negro Slaves in the West Indies" was published. The treatise stated that total emancipation was morally and ethically required and that slavery was a national crime which must be ended by parliamentary legislation to gradually abolish slavery. Members of Parliament did not agree, and government opposition in March 1823 stymied Wilberforce's call for abolition. On 15 May 1823, Buxton moved another resolution in Parliament for gradual emancipation. Debates followed on 16 March and 11 June 1824 in which Wilberforce made his last speeches in the House of Commons, and which again saw the emancipationists outmanoeuvred by the government.

== Last years ==
Wilberforce's health was continuing to fail, and he suffered further illnesses in 1824 and 1825. With his family concerned that his life was endangered, he declined a peerage (Note: According to George W. E. Russell, on the grounds that it would exclude his sons from intimacy with private gentlemen, clergymen and mercantile families.) and resigned his seat in Parliament, leaving the campaign to others.

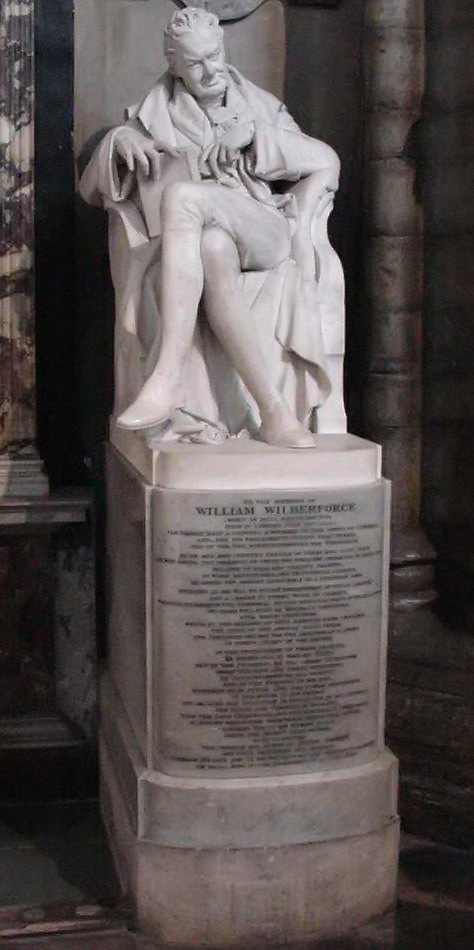
Wilberforce was buried in Westminster Abbey next to Pitt. This memorial statue, by Samuel Joseph (1791–1850), was erected in 1840 in the north choir aisle.

In 1826, Wilberforce moved from his large house in Kensington Gore to Hendon Park, a more modest property in the countryside of Mill Hill, north of London, where he was joined by his son William and family. The younger William had attempted a series of educational and career paths, and a venture into farming in 1830 led to huge losses, which his father repaid in full, despite offers from others to assist. This left Wilberforce with little income, and he was obliged to let his home and spend the rest of his life visiting family members and friends.

He continued his support for the anti-slavery cause, including attending and chairing meetings of the Anti-Slavery Society. Wilberforce approved of the 1830 election victory of the more progressive Whigs, though he was concerned about the implications of their Reform Bill which proposed the redistribution of parliamentary seats towards newer towns and cities and an extension of the franchise.

In 1833, Wilberforce's health declined further and he suffered a severe attack of influenza from which he never fully recovered. He made a final anti-slavery speech in April 1833 at a public meeting in Maidstone, Kent. The following month, the Whig government introduced the Bill for the Abolition of Slavery, formally saluting Wilberforce in the process. On 26 July 1833, Wilberforce heard of government concessions that guaranteed the passing of the bill. The following day he grew much weaker, and he died early on the morning of 29 July at his cousin's house in Cadogan Place, London.

=== Funeral ===
Wilberforce had left instructions that he be buried with his sister and daughter at St Mary's Church, Stoke Newington, just north of London. However, the leading members of both Houses of Parliament urged that he be honoured with a burial in Westminster Abbey. The family agreed and, on 3 August 1833, Wilberforce was buried in the north transept, close to his friend William Pitt. The funeral was attended by many Members of Parliament, as well as by members of the public. The pallbearers included the Duke of Gloucester, the Lord Chancellor Henry Brougham, and the Speaker of the House of Commons Charles Manners-Sutton. While tributes were paid and Wilberforce was laid to rest, both Houses of Parliament suspended their business as a mark of respect.

== Legacy ==
Five years after his death, sons Robert and Samuel Wilberforce published a five-volume biography about their father, and subsequently a collection of his letters in 1840. The biography was controversial in that the authors emphasised Wilberforce's role in the abolition movement and played down the important work of Thomas Clarkson. Clarkson wrote a book refuting their version of events, and the sons eventually made a half-hearted private apology to him and removed the offending passages in a revision of their biography. For more than a century, Wilberforce's role in the campaign dominated the historical record. Later historians have noted the warm and highly productive relationship between Clarkson and Wilberforce, and have termed it one of history's great partnerships: without both the parliamentary leadership supplied by Wilberforce and the research and public mobilisation organised by Clarkson, abolition could not have been achieved.

As his sons had desired and planned, Wilberforce has long been viewed as a Christian hero, a statesman-saint held up as a role model for putting his faith into action. Contemporary evangelical and conservative movements in North America appropriate his name and example in their activism. The strategies of Wilberforce and other abolitionists are invoked by anti-abortion activists, who controversially equate the abolition of slavery with ending abortion.

Wilberforce has also been described as a humanitarian reformer who contributed to reshaping the political and social attitudes of the time by promoting concepts of social responsibility and action. In the 1940s, the role of Wilberforce and the Clapham Sect in abolition was downplayed by historian Eric Williams, who argued that abolition was motivated not by humanitarianism but by economics, as the West Indian sugar industry was in decline. Williams's approach strongly influenced historians for much of the latter part of the 20th century. More recent historians have noted that the sugar industry was still making large profits at the time of the abolition of the slave trade, and this has led to a renewed interest in Wilberforce and the evangelicals, as well as a recognition of the anti-slavery movement as a prototype for subsequent humanitarian campaigns.

== Memorials ==
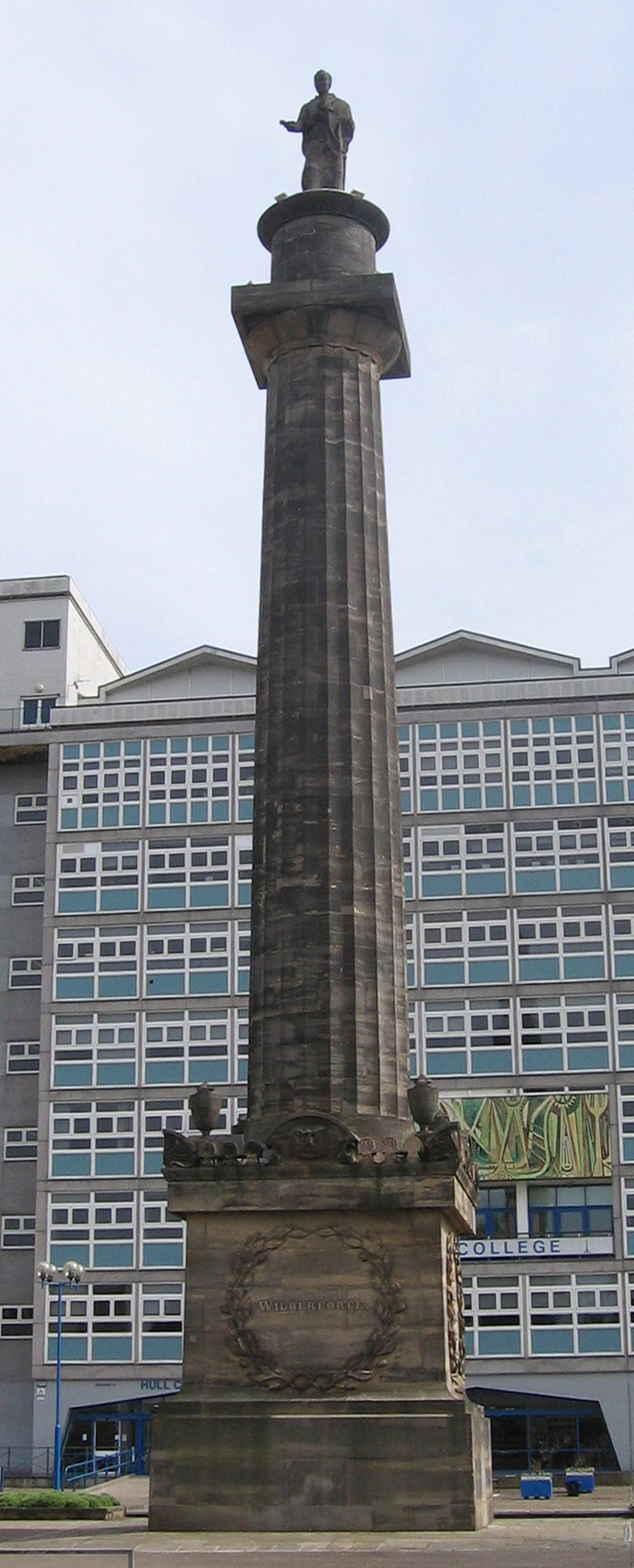
The Wilberforce Monument in the grounds of Hull College, Hull, erected in 1834

Wilberforce's life and work have been commemorated in the United Kingdom and elsewhere. In Westminster Abbey, a seated statue of Wilberforce by Samuel Joseph was erected in 1840, bearing an epitaph praising his Christian character and his long labour to abolish the slave trade and slavery.

In Wilberforce's hometown of Hull, a public subscription in 1834 funded the Wilberforce Monument, a 31-metre (102 ft) Greek Doric column topped by a statue of Wilberforce, which stands in the grounds of Hull College near Queen's Gardens. Wilberforce Memorial School for the Blind in York was established in 1833 in his honour. Wilberforce's birthplace was acquired by the city corporation in 1903 and, following renovation, Wilberforce House in Hull was opened as Britain's first slavery museum. In 2006, the University of Hull established the Wilberforce Institute for the study of Slavery and Emancipation in a building beside Wilberforce House.

Various churches within the Anglican Communion commemorate Wilberforce in their liturgical calendars, and Wilberforce University in Ohio, United States, founded in 1856, is named after him. The university was the first owned by African-American people, and is an historically black college. In Ontario, Canada, the Wilberforce Colony was founded by black reformers, and inhabited by freed slaves from the United States.

== In media ==
- Amazing Grace, a film about Wilberforce and the struggle against the slave trade, was released in 2007 to coincide with the 200th anniversary of Parliament's anti-slave trade legislation. It starred Ioan Gruffudd as Wilberforce.

== Works ==
- Wilberforce, William (1797). A Practical View of the Prevailing Religious System of Professed Christians, in the Middle and Higher Classes in this Country, Contrasted with Real Christianity. London: T. Caddell.
- Wilberforce, William (1807). A Letter on the Abolition of the Slave Trade, Addressed to the Freeholders of Yorkshire. London: T. Cadell and W. Davies, J. Hatchard.
- Wilberforce, William (1823). An Appeal to the Religion, Justice, and Humanity of the Inhabitants of the British Empire in behalf of the Negro slaves in the West Indies. London: J. Hatchard and Son.

== See also ==
- List of abolitionist forerunners
- List of civil rights leaders

== Works cited ==
- Ackerson, Wayne (2005). The African Institution (1807–1827) and the Antislavery Movement in Great Britain. Lewiston, New York: Edwin Mellen Press. ISBN 978-0-7734-6129-1. OCLC 58546501.
- Brown, Christopher Leslie (2006). Moral Capital: Foundations of British Abolitionism. Chapel Hill: University of North Carolina Press. ISBN 978-0-8078-5698-7. OCLC 62290468.
- D'Anjou, Leo (1996). Social Movements and Cultural Change: The First Abolition Campaign Revisited. New York: Aldine de Gruyter. ISBN 978-0-202-30522-6. OCLC 34151187.
- Hague, William (2007). William Wilberforce: The Life of the Great Anti-Slave Trade Campaigner. London: HarperPress. ISBN 978-0-00-722885-0. OCLC 80331607.
- Hochschild, Adam (2005). Bury the Chains, The British Struggle to Abolish Slavery. London: Macmillan. ISBN 978-0-330-48581-4. OCLC 60458010.
- Oldfield, John (2007). Chords of Freedom: Commemoration, Ritual and British Transatlantic Slavery. Manchester: Manchester University Press. ISBN 978-0-7190-6664-1. OCLC 132318401.
- Pollock, John (1977). Wilberforce. New York: St. Martin's Press. ISBN 978-0-09-460780-4. OCLC 3738175.
- Tomkins, Stephen (2007). William Wilberforce – A Biography. Oxford: Lion. ISBN 978-0-09-460780-4. OCLC 72149062.
- Wilberforce, R. I.; Wilberforce, S. (1838). The Life of William Wilberforce. London: John Murray. OCLC 4023508. Volume 1 Volume 2 Volume 3 Volume 4 Volume 5

Parliament of Great Britain
Preceded by David Hartley	Member of Parliament for Kingston upon Hull; 1780–1784	Succeeded by Walter Spencer Stanhope
Preceded by Francis Ferrand Foljambe	Member of Parliament for Yorkshire; 1784–1801	(Parliament abolished)
Parliament of the United Kingdom
Preceded by (Parliament created)	Member of Parliament for Yorkshire; 1801–1812	Succeeded by Henry Lascelles
Preceded by Henry Jodrell	Member of Parliament for Bramber; 1812–1825	Succeeded by Arthur Gough-Calthorpe
