= Spooner (surname) =

Spooner is a surname of English origin. It may refer to:

- The Spooners of Porthmadog, a family of railway engineers, among them Charles Edwin Spooner

== A ==
- Archibald Spooner (1886–1965), English cricketer
- Arthur Spooner (painter) (1873–1962), English painter

== B ==
- Barbara Spooner, married name Barbara Wilberforce (1771–1847), spouse of the abolitionist William Wilberforce
- Bathsheba Spooner (1746–1778), the first woman to be executed in the United States by Americans
- Bill Spooner (born 1949), American musician
- Bill Spooner (politician) (1897–1966), Australian politician
- Brian Spooner (anthropologist), British anthropologist
- Brian Spooner (mycologist) (born 1951), English mycologist

== C ==
- Casey Spooner (born 1970), American musician and artist
- Catharine Spooner, married name Catharine Tait (1819–1878), British philanthropist, daughter of Archdeacon William Spooner
- Cecil Spooner (1875–1953), American actress, screenwriter and film director
- Charles Spooner (engraver) (died 1767), Irish mezzotinter
- Charles Spooner (veterinary surgeon) (1806–1871), English veterinary surgeon
- Charles Spooner (cricketer) (1909–1988) Barbadian cricketer
- Charles Edwin Spooner (1853–1909), British engineer
- Clifford Spooner (born 1933), British water polo player

== D ==
- Danny Spooner (1936–2017), Australian singer and social historian
- David Brainerd Spooner (1879–1925), American archeologist and linguist
- Dennis Spooner (1932–1986), English television screenwriter and story editor
- Dick Spooner (1919–1997), English cricketer
- Doreen Spooner (1928–2019), English newspaper photographer

== E ==
- Edna May Spooner (1873–1953), American actress, playwright and vaudeville performer
- Ella Josephine Spooner (1875–1973), American college professor
- Eric Spooner (1891–1952), Australian politician
- Ernest John Spooner (1887–1942), Rear-Admiral Malaya, commander of UK Naval forces in Singapore

== F ==
- Florence Garrettson Spooner (1840s–1935), American social reformer
- Frank Spooner (born 1937), Louisiana Republican politician

== G ==
- George Spooner (1893–1975), New Zealand politician
- Glenda Spooner (1897–1981), British journalist and author on horses
- Graham Spooner (1933–2015), Australian rules footballer

== H ==
- Hardwicke Spooner (1851–1933), English Anglican priest and author
- Henry Spooner (priest) (died 1929), English cleric, Archdeacon of Maidstone
- Henry J. Spooner (1839–1918), Rhode Island Congressman
- Hugh Spooner (born 1957), Canadian sprinter

== I ==
- Isaac Spooner (c.1735–1816), English ironmaster and banker

== J ==
- James Spooner (born 1976), American film director
- Joe Spooner (born 1973), New Zealand competitive sailor
- John Spooner (born 1946), Australian editorial cartoonist
- John Coit Spooner (1843–1919), U.S. Senator and lawyer from Wisconsin

== K ==
- Karl Spooner (1931–1984), Major League Baseball pitcher with the Brooklyn Dodgers
- Kenneth Spooner (1922–1943), British Aircraftman posthumously awarded the George Cross

== L ==
- Lloyd Spooner (1884–1966), American sports shooter and Olympic champion
- Louisa M. Spooner, pseudonym (1820–1886), was a Welsh novelist
- Lysander Spooner (1808–1887), American individualist anarchist

== M ==
- Mark Spooner (born 1984), New Zealand weightlifter
- Meagan Spooner, American author
- Minnie Dibdin Spooner (1867–1949), British artist and illustrator

== N ==
- Natalie Spooner (born 1990), Canadian ice hockey player
- Nathan Spooner (born 1975), Australian rugby union player
- Nicholas Spooner (field hockey) (born 1991), South African field hockey player
- Nicky Spooner (born 1971), English footballer

== P ==
- Paul Spooner (1746–1789), Vermont Lieutenant Governor and Vermont Supreme Court justice
- Peter Spooner (1910–1987), English footballer
- Philip Loring Spooner (1879–1945), American tenor
- Philip L. Spooner Jr. (1847–1918), American businessman and politician in Wisconsin, brother of John Coit Spooner

== Q ==
- Qadr Spooner (born 1992), Canadian football player

== R ==
- Red Spooner (1910—1984), Canadian ice hockey goaltender
- Reggie Spooner (1880–1961), English cricketer
- Richard Spooner (MP) (1783–1864), British Member of Parliament and businessman
- Richard Spooner (equestrian), American show jumping rider
- Richard T. Spooner (born 1925), United States Marine Corps officer
- Richard Spooner (MP), (1783–1864), MP and ecclesiastical writer
- Ryan Spooner (born 1992), Canadian ice hockey player

== S ==
- Shearjashub Spooner (1809–1859), American physician and writer
- Stanley Spooner (1856–1940), English journalist and editor, creator of Flight magazine
- Steve Spooner (born 1961), English footballer
- Steven Spooner (born 1970), American pianist

== W ==
- Wilf Spooner (1910–2001), Canadian politician
- William Archibald Spooner (1844–1930), English clergyman and scholar, after whom spoonerisms are named
- William Spooner (priest) (1778–1857), archdeacon of Coventry
- William Charles Spooner (c.1809–1885), English veterinary surgeon
- William Wycliffe Spooner (1882–1967), founded the Spooner Dryer and Engineering Company
- Winifred Spooner (1900–1933), English aviator
- Wyman Spooner (1795–1877), Wisconsin politician and Lieutenant Governor

== Fictional characters ==
- Arthur Spooner, on the television show The King of Queens
- Bert Spooner, on the television show Are You Being Served?
- Del Spooner, hero of the 2004 film I, Robot
- Jim Spooner, on the television show Swift and Shift Couriers
