= William Spooner =

William Spooner may refer to:

- William Spooner, ancestor of Lysander Spooner, who arrived at Plymouth Colony in 1637
- William Archibald Spooner (1844–1930), professor of spoonerism fame
- William Spooner (priest) (1778–1857), archdeacon of Coventry
- William Charles Spooner (1809?–1885), English veterinary surgeon
- William Wycliffe Spooner (1882–1967), founded the Spooner Dryer and Engineering Company
- Bill Spooner (politician) (1897–1966), Australian federal politician
- Bill Spooner (born 1949), musician
