= Charles Spooner =

Charles Spooner may refer to:

- Charles Spooner (engraver) (died 1767), Irish mezzotinter
- Charles Spooner (veterinary surgeon) (1806–1871), English veterinary surgeon
- Charles Spooner (cricketer) (1909–1988), Barbadian cricketer
- Charles Edwin Spooner (1853–1909), British engineer
- William Charles Spooner (1809?–1885), English veterinary surgeon
