= Spon =

Spon may refer to:

- Spiegel Online, the online version of German news magazine Der Spiegel
- The Old English term for a wooden roof tile or shingle made by a 'Sponner'. This tradename is the origin of the surname Spooner.
- An all-purpose nonsense word used in several episodes of The Goon Show, a radio comedy broadcast by the BBC between 1951 and 1960. It might refer to a place, a disease, or an unpleasant substance.
- A district on the outskirts of the UK city of Coventry (Spon End), or the road leading to that district from the city centre (Spon Street).
- Spon Press, a publisher acquired by Taylor & Francis

== People with the surname ==
- Jacob Spon (1647–1685), French doctor and archaeologist
