= T. C. Wilson =

Colorado state legislator

T. C. Wilson was an American state legislator in Colorado. She was listed as a merchant from Victor, Colorado. She and W. A. Spooner represented Teller County and Park County. She chaired the Committee on Revision and Engrossment. A Republican, her "City Address" was listed as the Adams Hotel. She was a member of The Military Sisterhood of the World War.
