= Rookery House =

Municipal building in Erdington, West Midlands, England

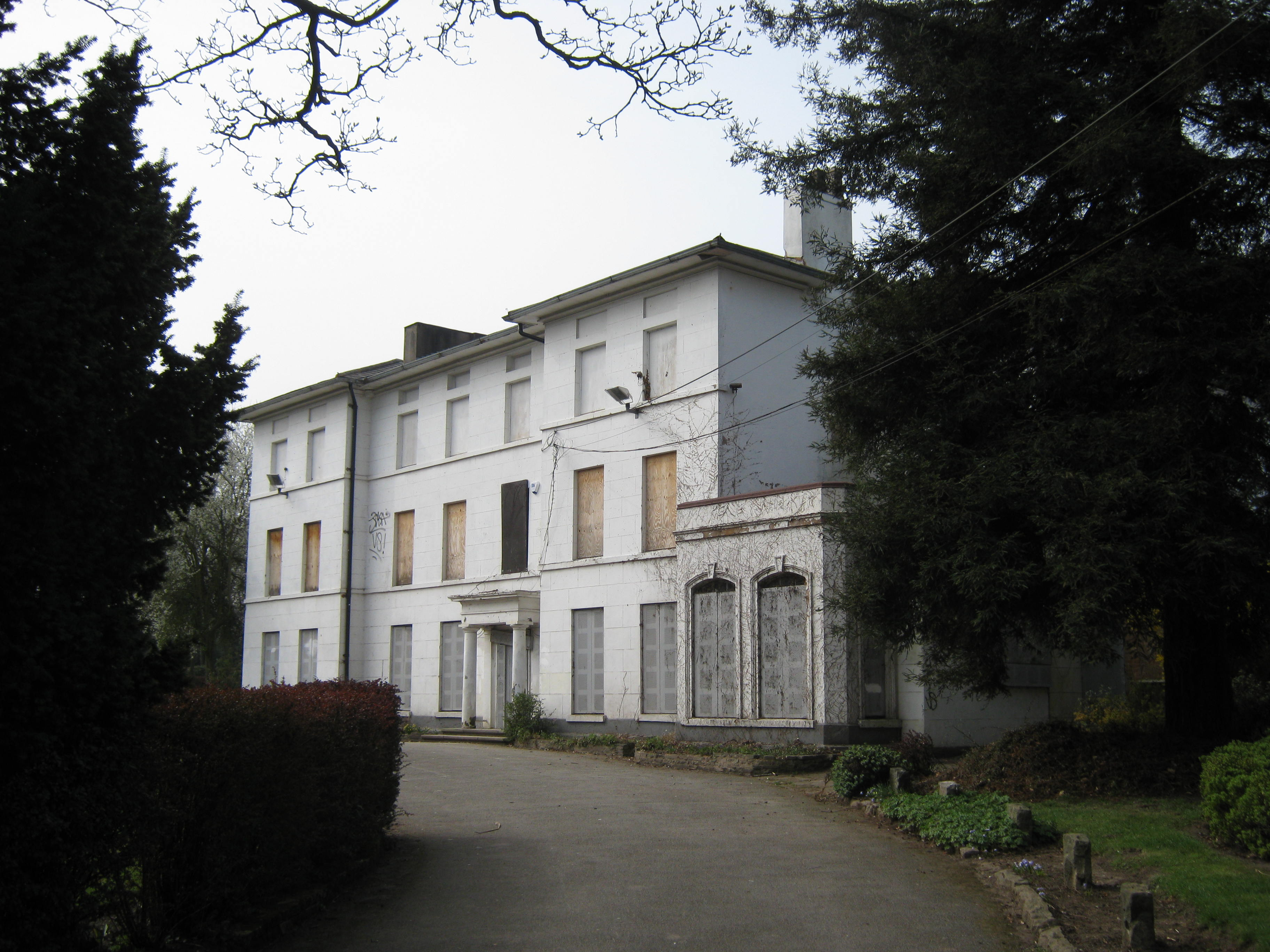
- The building in 2011

- Shown in West Midlands
- 52.5175°N 1.8348°W
- Location: Wilberforce Way, Erdington

History
- Built: 1727

Site notes
- Architectural style: Neoclassical style

Listed Building – Grade II
- Official name: House in Rookery Park, Rookery Park, Handsworth
- Designated: 7 July 1982
- Reference no.: 1076201

Rookery House, formerly Erdington Town Hall and, before that, Birches Green House, is a former municipal building in Wilberforce Way in Erdington, a suburb of Birmingham in England. The house, which started life as a private residence, became the headquarters of Erdington Urban District Council and was then returned to residential use, is a Grade II listed building.

== History ==
The building was commissioned by Abraham Spooner, an ironmaster who was the proprietor of Bromford Forge and Aston Furnace. The site he selected in Birches Green was occupied by an earlier timber-framed house. Originally known as Birches Green House, the new building was designed in the neoclassical style, built in brick with a stucco finish and was completed in 1727.

Abraham's son, Isaac, who was a banker, inherited the house in 1788, and Isaac's son, Richard, was born there and went on to be a member of parliament. After Abraham's granddaughter, Barbara, married the anti-slavery campaigner, William Wilberforce, in May 1797, the house became their home. The house was remodelled in the early 19th century. The glass manufacturer, Brueton Gibbons, who installed plate glass doors in the house, lived there from 1816 and the pencil-case manufacturer, William Wiley, lived there from 1871.

Following significant population growth, largely associated with residential development, a local board of health was formed in the Aston Parish area in 1869. After the local board of health was succeeded, in that part of the parish, by Erdington Urban District Council in 1894, the new council began using the building as its headquarters. The building remained the local seat of government until the area was annexed by Birmingham City Council in 1911.

The council continued to use the building, latterly as a social services office, until 2008. It subsequently fell into poor repair and the council declared it surplus to requirements. It was sold it to a developer, Cameron Homes, in 2017, and construction work, to convert the building into 15 residential apartments, started in 2019.

== Architecture ==
The three-storey building is constructed of brick, covered in stucco, with a slate roof. It is seven bays wide, with the central section of three bays slightly recessed. There is an off-centre entrance, in a porch formed by Doric order columns supporting an entablature and a cornice. The building is fenestrated by sash windows. There are various extensions, including a two-bay single storey addition to the right of the original building. It has been grade II listed since 1982.
