= Shaji-ki-Dheri =

Site of an ancient Kanishka stupa in Pakistan

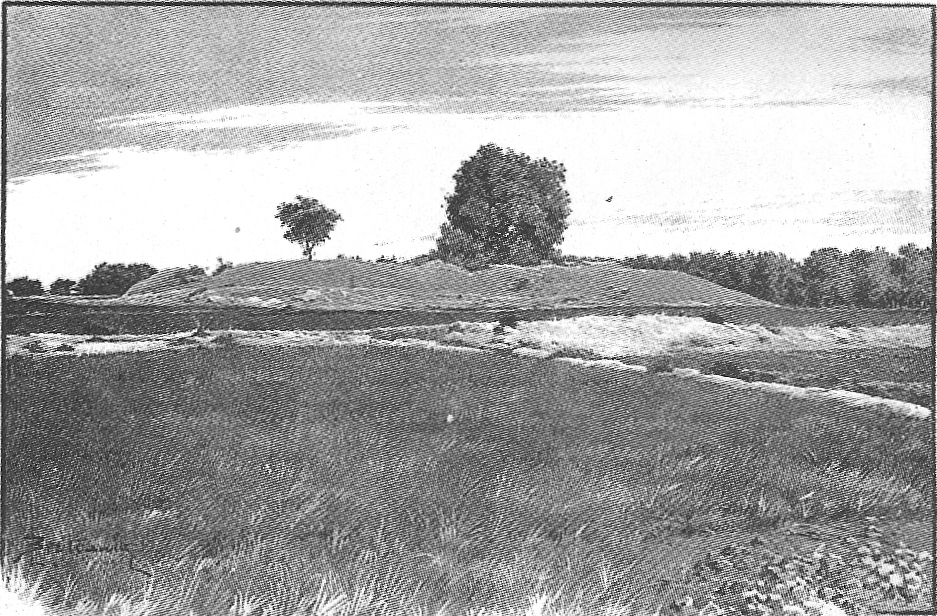
1899 engraving showing the remnants of the Kanishka stupa in Shaji-ki-Dheri.

Shaji-ki-Dheri is the site of an ancient Kanishka stupa about 6 kilometers from Peshawar, Pakistan.

French archaeologist Alfred Charles Auguste Foucher, who was a professor at the University of Paris, had visited Peshawar towards the end of the 19th century, and had noticed two mounds southeast of Peshawar outside the walled city. He tried to relate them to Hiuen Tsang's description of the place. The excavations began. American archaeologist David Brainard Spooner conducted excavations there in 1908-09 for the Archaeological Survey of India leading to the identification of the Kanishka stupa dated to the 2nd century CE, and the discovery of the Kanishka casket. Spooner published a paper following the excavations: "Excavation at Shaji-ki-dheri: Annual Reports of the Archaeological Survey of India 1908–09".

Many statues of the Buddha at Shaji-ki-Dheri feature a halo similar to the haloes seen in the Buddha coins of Kanishka I, suggesting a 2nd century CE date for the creation of the statues, rather than the usual datation to the 3-4th century CE.

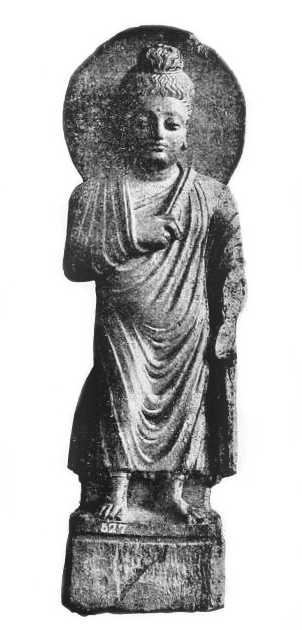
Statue of the Buddha, probably Shaji-ki-Dheri.

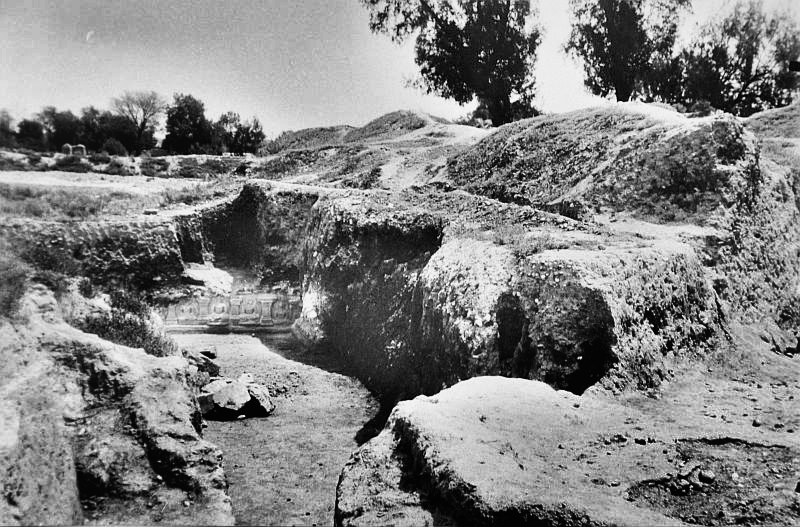
Excavations in 1910.

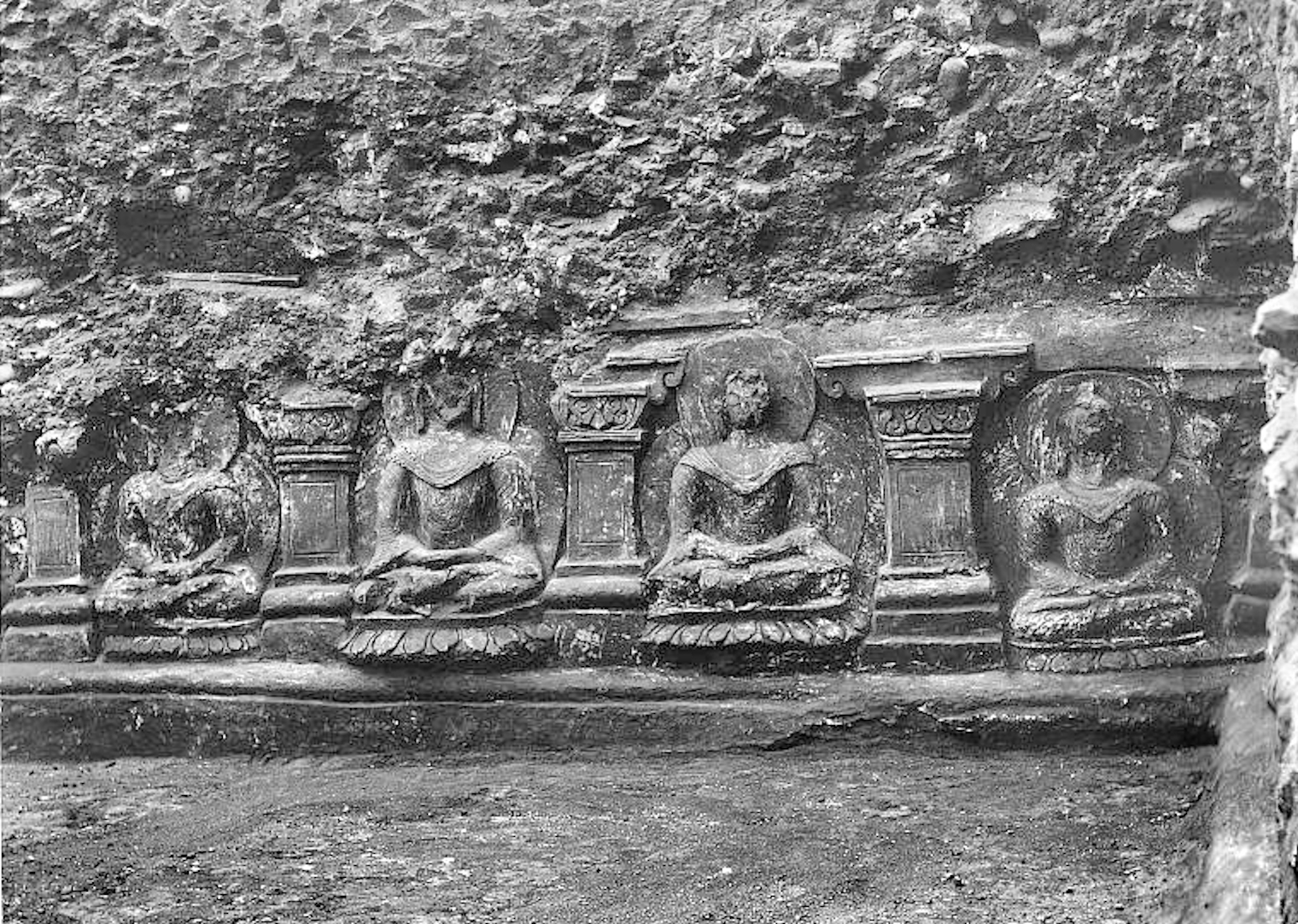
Remains of the stupa.

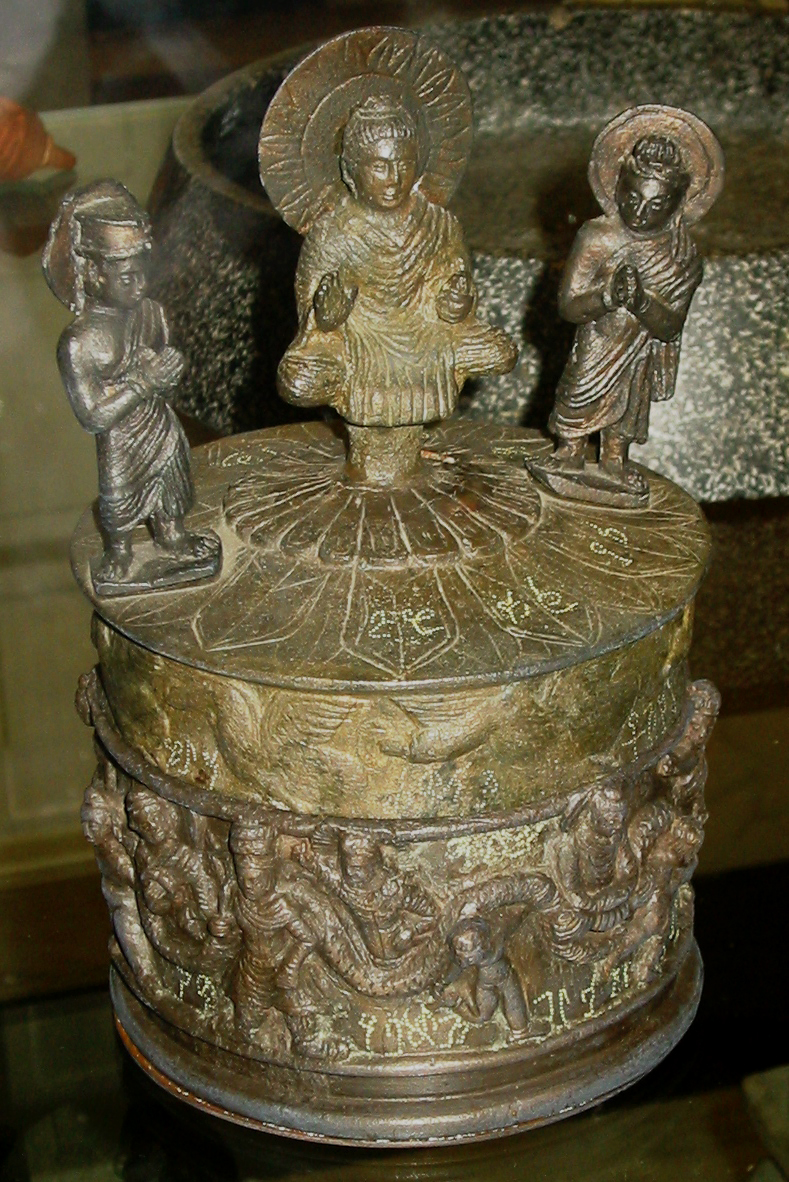
Kanishka casket found in the ruins, British Museum.

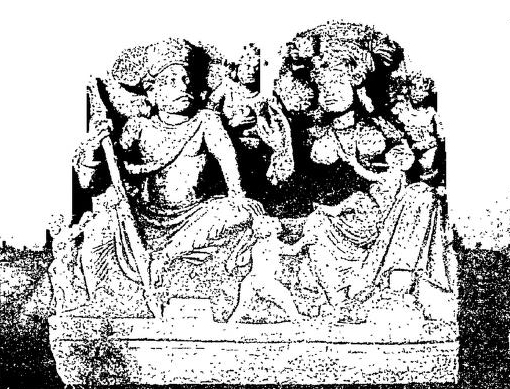
Statue of Kubera and Hariti.

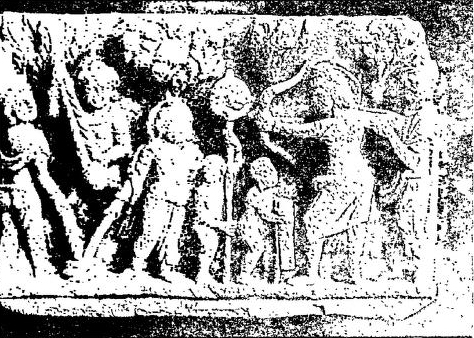
Jataka of the Bow contest.

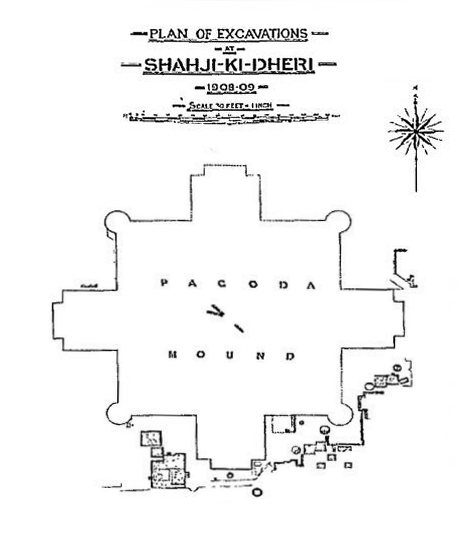
Ground plan of the stupa.
