= Spooner =

Spooner may refer to:

== People and fictional characters ==
- Spooner (surname), a list of people and fictional characters
- Spooner Oldham (born 1943), American songwriter and musician

== Places ==
- Spooner, Wisconsin, a city
- Spooner (town), Wisconsin
- Spooner Bay, Enderby Land, Antarctica
- Spooner Lake, a reservoir on North Canyon Creek in Nevada
- Spooner Row, a village in Norfolk, England
- Spooner Summit, a mountain pass through the Sierra Nevada's Carson Range spur
- Spooner Township, Lake of the Woods County, Minnesota

== Entertainment ==
- Spooner (band), an American midwestern rock band
- Spooner (1989 film), a US made-for-TV movie starring Robert Urich
- Spooner, a 2009 American movie directed by Drake Doremus

== Other uses ==
- Another name for a spoon tray
- Spooner (colloquial), Australian slang term

== See also ==
- Spooner Act of 1902, authored by John Coit Spooner and authorizing President Theodore Roosevelt to purchase rights to build the Panama Canal
