= William Spooner (priest) =

English cleric, Archdeacon of Coventry (1778–1857)

- Born: 1778; Birches Green, Erdington, Warwickshire
- Died: 1857 (aged 78–79); The Vicarage, East Farleigh, Kent
- Education: St John's College, Oxford
- Parent(s): Isaac Spooner; Barbara Gough

William Spooner (1778–1857) was an English priest, Archdeacon of Coventry from 1827 to 1851. The post was historically within the Diocese of Lichfield, but during Spooner's tenure it moved in 1837 to the Diocese of Worcester.

== Life ==
He was the fourth son of Isaac Spooner of Aston, and brother of Barbara Spooner, and was educated at Rugby School. He matriculated at St John's College, Oxford in 1796, graduating B.A. in 1800, M.A. in 1803. He held incumbencies at Elmdon, Chipping Camden and Acle.

== Family ==
Spooner married in 1810 Anna Maria Sydney O'Brien, fifth daughter of Sir Lucius O'Brien, 3rd Baronet and his wife Anna French. Their children were:

- William Spooner (1811–1880), barrister, father of William Archibald Spooner and Henry Spooner
- Anna Maria (1812–1899)
- Barbara Mary (1813–1895)
- Elizabeth (1815–1886)
- Lucius Henry Spooner (1816–1854)
- Frances Ann (1818–1868)
- Catharine (1819–1878), married 1843 Archibald Campbell Tait
- Rev. Edward Spooner (1821–1899)
- Gerard Spooner (1823–c.1908)
- Charles Spooner (1824–1881)
