= Kanishka Stupa =

Stupa on the outskirts of Peshawar, Pakistan

- کانیشکا سټوپا (Pashto) کنشک اسٹوپ (Urdu)
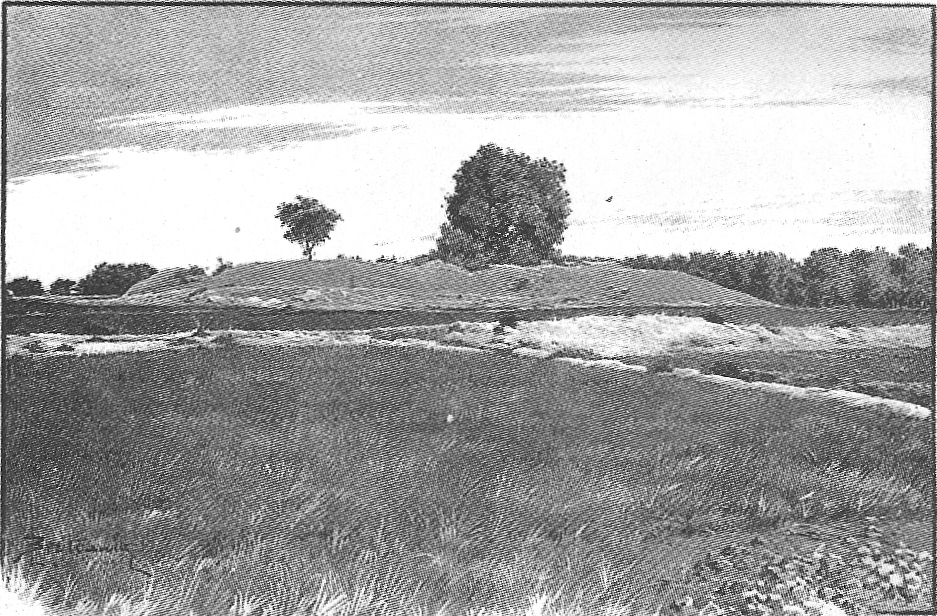
- 1899 engraving showing the remnants of the Kanishka Stupa in Shaji-ki-Dheri

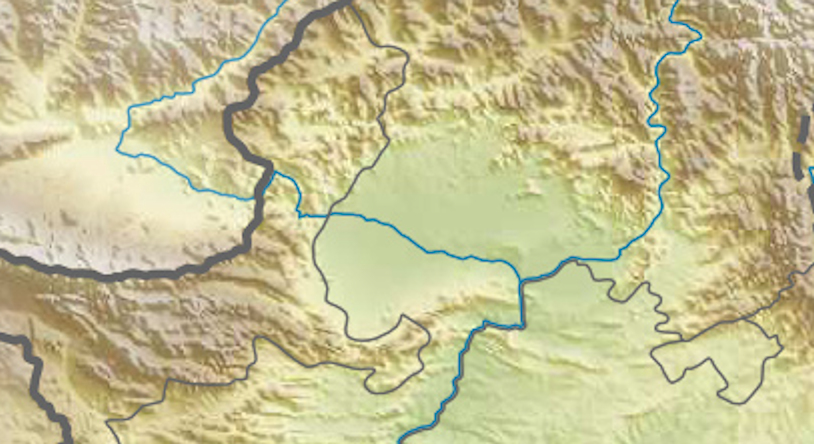
- Location within Pakistan Location within Gandhara
- 33°59′58″N 71°35′30″E
- Type: Stupa
- Periods: 2nd C.E.
- Location: Peshawar, Khyber Pakhtunkhwa, Pakistan
- Part of: Kushan Empire and White Huns

Site notes
- Height: 400 feet (120 m) to 560 feet (170 m)

The Kanishka Stupa (Pashto: کانیشکا سټوپا; Urdu: کنشک اسٹوپ) was a monumental stupa established by King Kanishka of Kushan during the 2nd century CE in today's Shaji-ki-Dheri on the outskirts of Peshawar, Pakistan.

Considered among the tallest buildings in the ancient world, the stupa was built during the Kushan era to house Buddhist relics which were transferred to the U Khanti Hall at Mandalay Hill in Burma after their discovery.

== History ==
=== Background ===
According to Buddhists the building of the stupa was foretold by the Buddha:

"The Buddha, pointing to a small boy making a mud tope….[said] that on that spot Kanishka would erect a tope by his name." Vinaya sutra

The same story is repeated in a Khotanese scroll found at Dunhuang, which first described how Kanishka would arrive 400 years after the death of the Buddha. The account also describes how Kanishka came to raise his stupa:

"A desire thus arose in [Kanishka to build a vast stupa]….at that time the four world-regents learnt the mind of the king. So for his sake they took the form of young boys….[and] began a stupa of mud....the boys said to [Kanishka] ‘We are making the Kanishka-stupa.’….At that time the boys changed their form....[and] said to him, ‘Great king, by you according to the Buddha’s prophecy is a Sangharama to be built wholly (?) with a large stupa and hither relics must be invited which the meritorious good beings...will bring."

=== First stupa (150 CE) ===
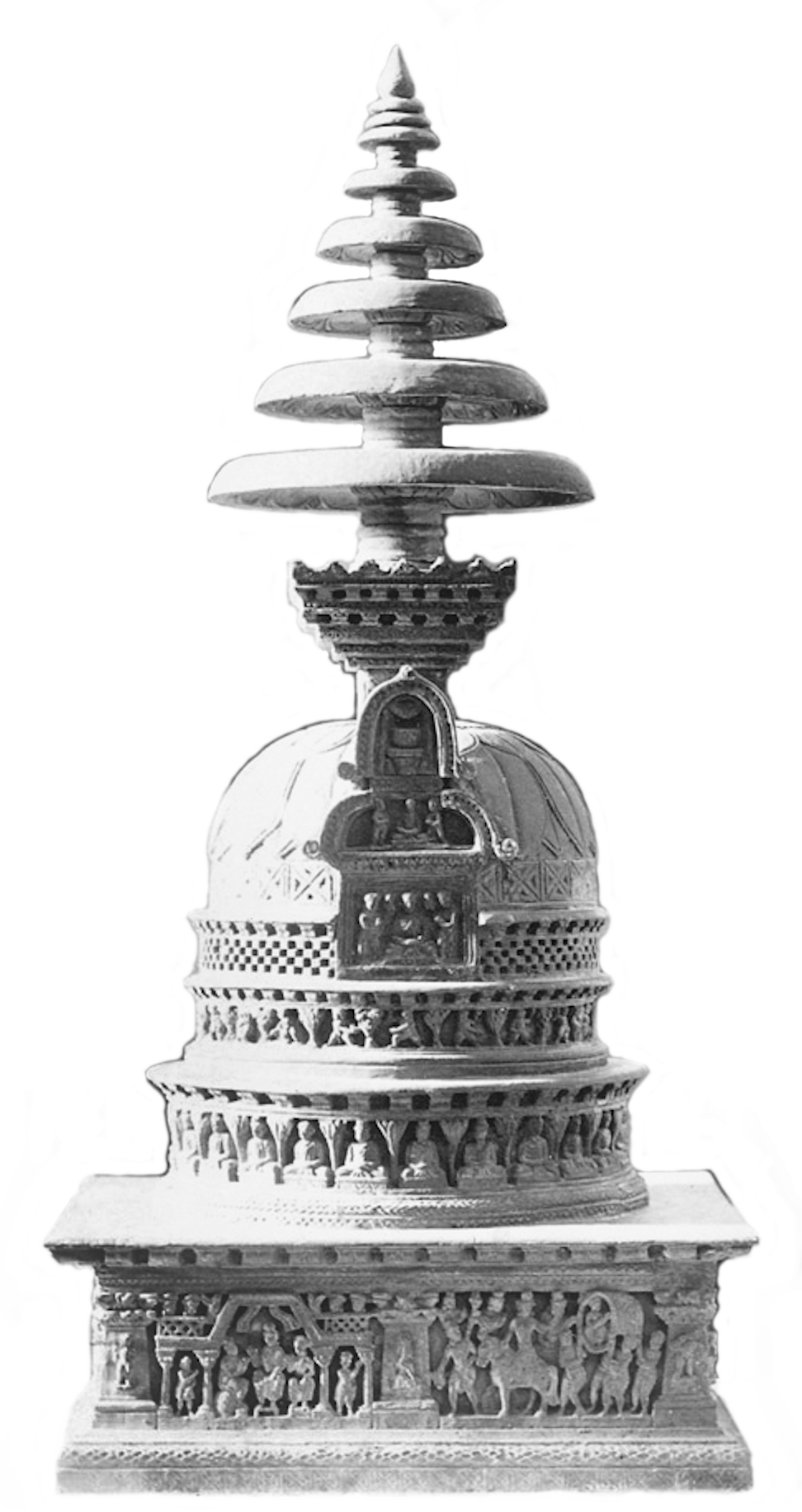
Probable initial appearance of the first stupa. Loriyan Tangai, 2nd century CE.

The original Kushan stone stupa was probably built after the death of Kanishka the Great, between 150 and 300 CE, but probably circa 151 CE, with a shape similar to the contemporary Loriyan Tangai stupas and the addition of schist reliefs.

=== Second stupa (4th century CE) ===
The stupa was rebuilt under Kushan rule in the 4th century CE into a cruciform stupa with a tower-like structure, with four staircases and four corner bastions, and possibly pillars at each corner. The stupa's symmetrically cross-shaped plinth measured 175 feet (53 m), though the plinth had large staircases at each of the stupa's sides. In total, the base of the stupa may have spanned 272 feet (83 m) on each side. The plinth was likely decorated with sculpted reliefs, while niches built into the dome's four cardinal points was inlayed with precious stone. The tall wooden superstructure was built atop a decorated stone base, and crowned with a 13-layer copper-gilded chatra. Modern estimations suggest that the stupa had a height of 400 feet (120 m).

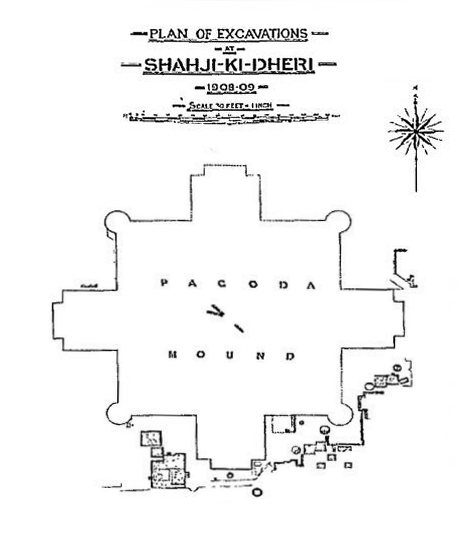
Ground plan of the second stupa, of a cruxiform shape. The central square plinth is 175 feet (53 m) wide, the full width, including the stairs is 272 feet (83 m).

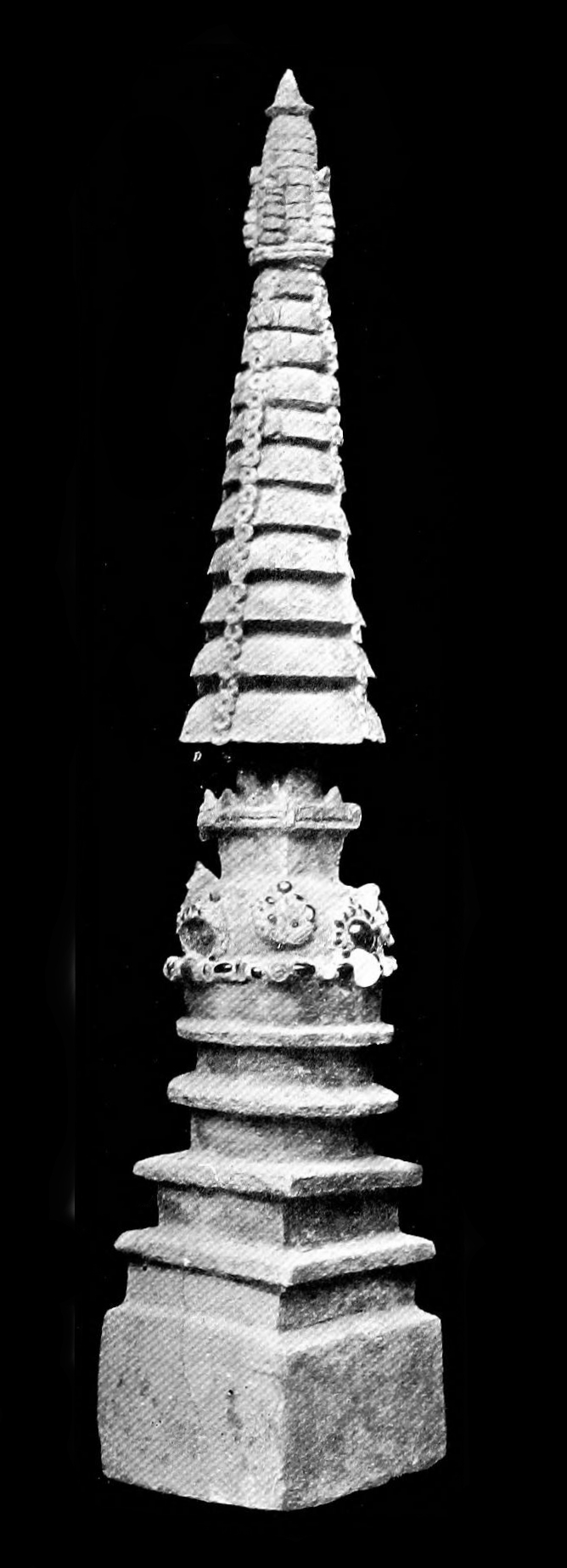
A Stupa-shaped reliquary, the design of which might be used to explain the reported great height of the Kanishka stupa. Jaulian monastery.

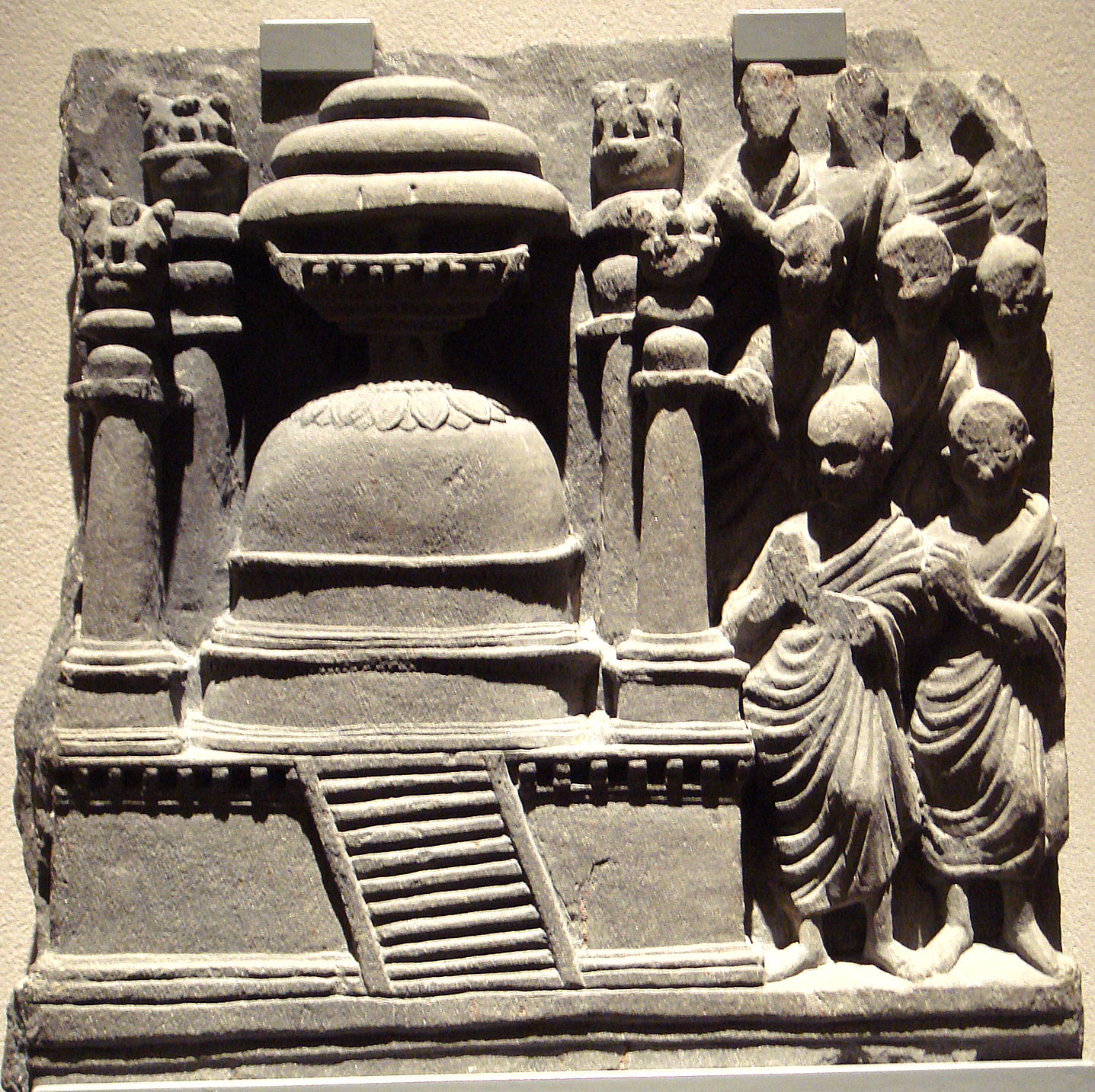
Stupa with a square base, and pillars at the four corners, Gandhara 2nd Century.

=== Reconstruction ===
The stupa's wooden superstructure was rebuilt atop the stone base, and crowned with a 13-layer copper-gilded chatra. In the 5th century CE, stucco imagery was probably added to the site, in keeping with contemporary popularity for Buddhist imagery.

=== Destruction ===
Sung Yun noted in the early 6th century that the tower had been struck by lightning at least three times, having been rebuilt after each strike. The tall stupa with a copper top acted as a lightning rod. This propensity to attract lightning strikes may explain the dearth of any surviving examples of wooden-tower stupas.

In 726 CE, the Korean pilgrim Hyecho visited Gandhara and saw the Kanishka monastery and stupa, of which he said in his Memoir of the pilgrimage to the five kingdoms of India (Chinese: 往五天竺國傳): "The monastery is called Kanishka. There is a great stupa which constantly glows. The monastery and the stupa were built by the former king Kanishka". (Note: "Three days' travel from this city to the west, there is a great monastery which was the residential monastery of Bodhisattvas Vasubandhu and Asanga. The monastery is called Kaniska. There is a great stupa which constantly glows. The monastery and the stupa were built by the former king Kaniska, so the monastery was named after him.")

== Excavations ==
The stupa was discovered and excavated in 1908–1909 by a British archaeological mission under David Brainard Spooner, and led to the discovery in its base of the Kanishka casket, a six-sided rock crystal reliquary containing three small fragments of bone, relics of the Buddha (which were transferred to Mandalay, Burma) and a dedication in Kharoshthi involving Kanishka.

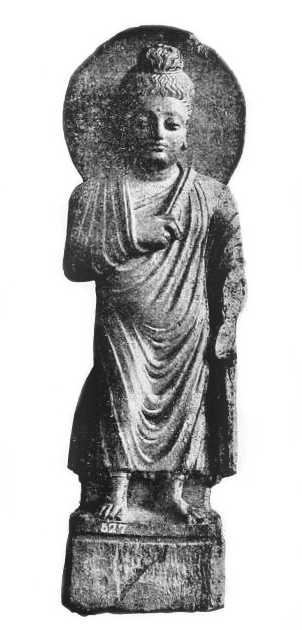
Statue of the Buddha, probably Shaji-ki-Dheri (Kanishka stupa).

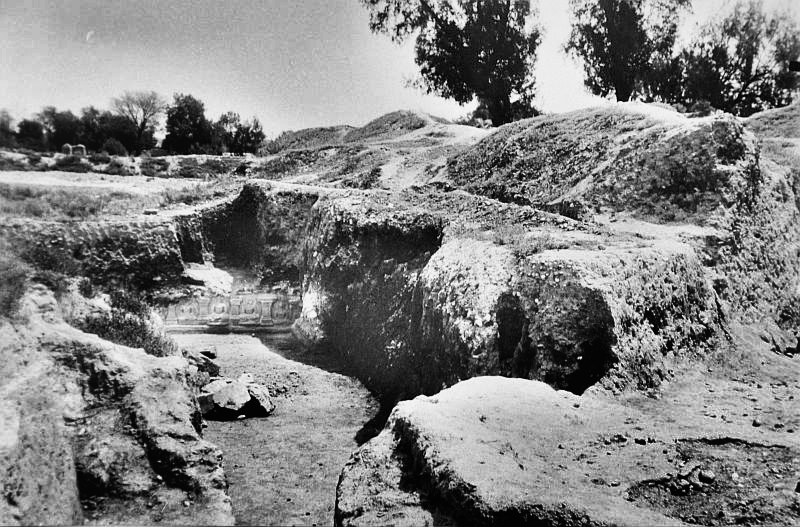
Excavations in 1910.

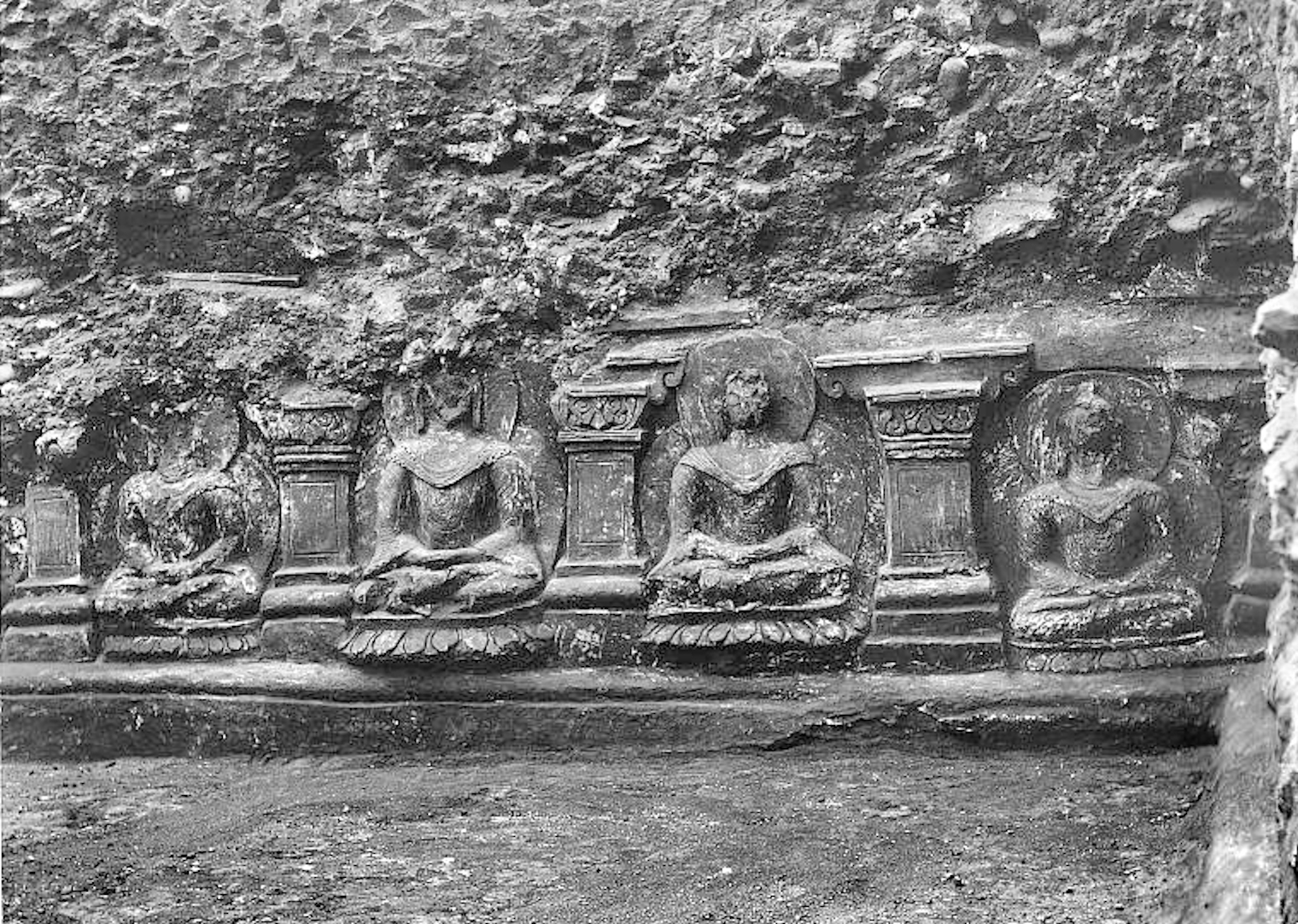
Remains of the stupa.

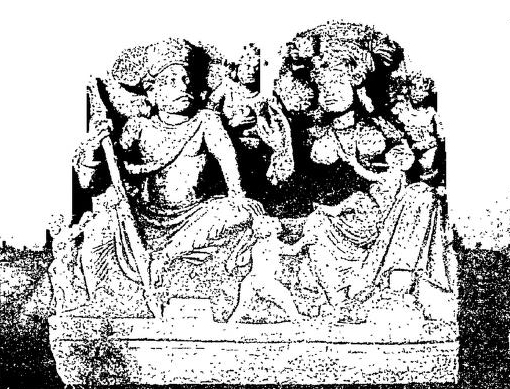
Statue of Kubera and Hariti.

== Contemporary accounts ==
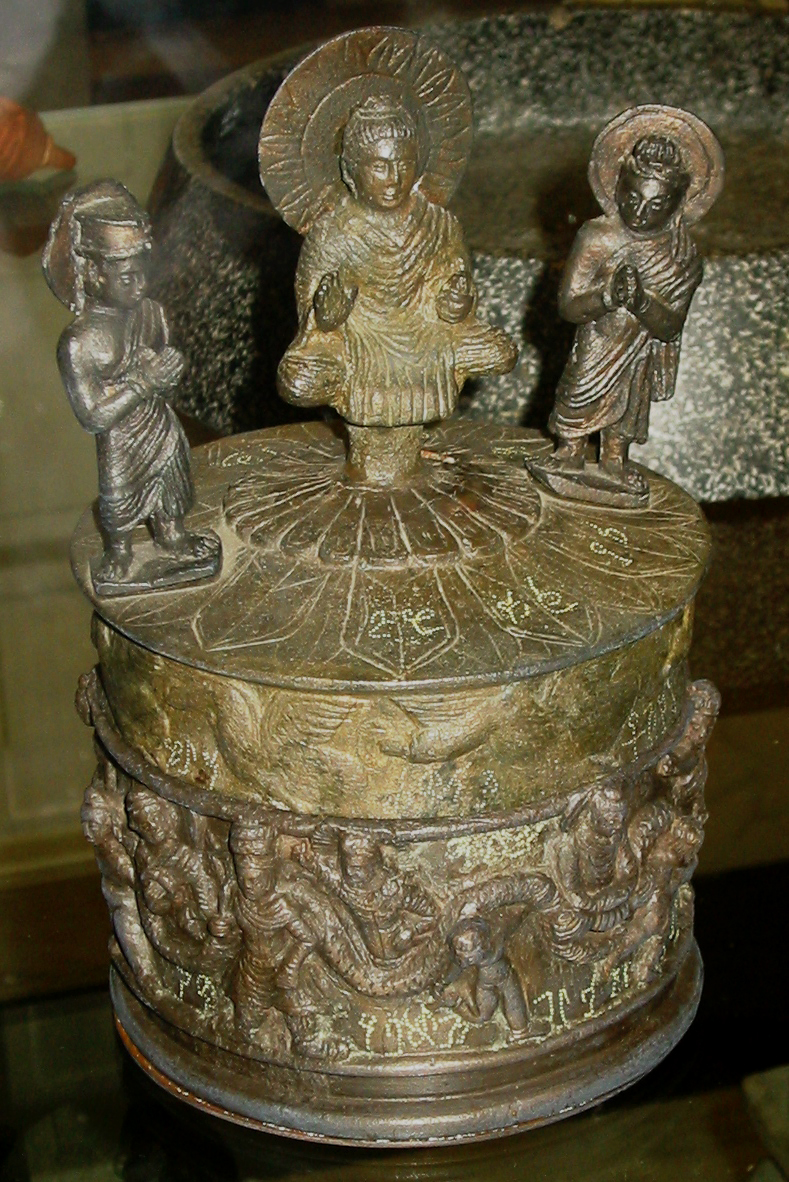
The inscribed Kanishka casket found at the site of the Kanishka Stupa and containing relics of the Buddha, now in Peshawar Museum, Pakistan, while the relics are in Mandalay, Burma.

In the 400s CE, the Chinese Buddhist pilgrim Faxian visited the structure and described it as "the highest of all the towers" in the "terrestrial world", which ancient travelers claimed was up to 560 feet (170 m) tall, though modern estimates suggest a height of 400 feet (120 m).

In 520 CE, Sung Yun describes the stupa in the following terms:

"The king proceeded to widen the foundation of the Great Tower 300 paces and more. To crown all, he placed a roof-pole upright and even. Throughout the building he used ornamental wood, he constructed stairs to lead to the top....there was an iron-pillar, 3-feet high with thirteen gilded circlets. Altogether the height from the ground was 700 feet.”

== Legacy ==
The stupa is believed to have influence later constructions of "tower stupas" throughout ancient Turkistan. The construction of wooden towers topped with metal chatras made such buildings act as lightning rods, which could explain why such towers have all but disappeared.

== Current status ==
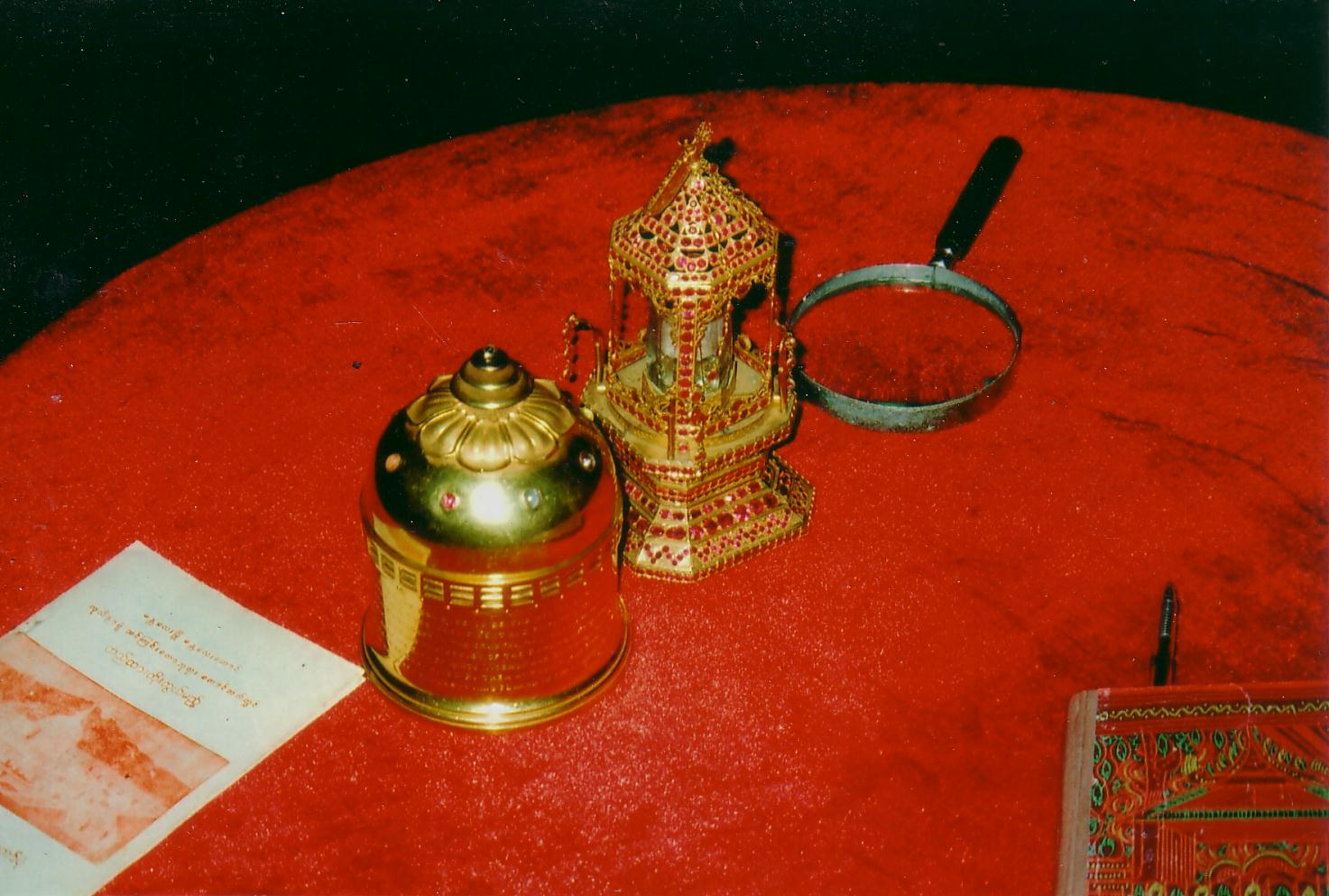
Buddha relics from Kanishka's stupa were transferred to Mandalay, Burma.

The site has not been preserved. The location was re-identified in 2011. It is located outside the Gunj Gate of the old Walled City of Peshawar and is called Akhunabad.

== See also ==
- List of tallest structures built before the 20th century
