= Tyburn, West Midlands =

Area of Birmingham, England

Coordinates: 52.5227°N 1.8100°W

Tyburn
- Location within the West Midlands
- Population: 25,927 (2011.Ward)
  - Density: 29.1 per ha
- OS grid reference: SP135912
- Metropolitan borough: Birmingham
- Metropolitan county: West Midlands
- Region: West Midlands
- Country: England
- Sovereign state: United Kingdom
- Post town: BIRMINGHAM
- Postcode district: B24, B35
- Dialling code: 0121
- Police: West Midlands
- Fire: West Midlands
- Ambulance: West Midlands
- UK Parliament: Birmingham Erdington

Tyburn is a ward in Birmingham, in the county of West Midlands, England formerly known as Kingsbury.

It is part of the Erdington formal district and comprises Castle Vale, Fort Parkway in Castle Bromwich, the Pype Hayes area of Erdington, Birches Green and Tyburn Road. The significant landmarks in the area include Jaguar Cars' Castle Bromwich Assembly factory, Fort Dunlop and Pype Hayes Park.

The Castle Vale Library, built in 2006, serves the area. The library was designed by Birmingham-based Associated Architects and built by the Castle Vale Housing Action Trust.

== Geography of the area ==
Tyburn covers the municipal housing estates of Birches Green, Pype Hayes and Castle Vale as well as Erdington Hall, a residential area.

The housing estates of Pype Hayes and Castle Vale have witnessed significant regeneration in recent times. Entire estates in Pype Hayes were cleared and replaced with modern housing by Birmingham City Council. Castle Vale was home to one of Europe's largest urban regeneration projects which resulted in the demolition of many tower blocks and low rise flats and the construction of a retail park and semi-detached modern housing. This was done by the Housing Action Trust, established in 1993.

The industrial area of Bromford was formerly part of the old Kingsbury Ward most of which was incorporated into the new Tyburn Ward. It has witnessed redevelopment in the form of the construction of the Fort Shopping Centre and the Heartlands Spine Road which connects the A47 Nechells to the A47 Chester Road.

== Population ==
The 2001 census recorded that there were 16,480 people living in Tyburn with a population density of 2,816 people per km^{2} compared with 3,649 people per km^{2} for Birmingham. This ward has the smallest population of all Birmingham City wards. 8.9% (1,465) of the ward's population consists of ethnic minorities compared with 29.6% for Birmingham in general. At the time of the 2011 census the population had increased to 25,927.

== Politics ==
Tyburn is represented by three Labour councillors on Birmingham City Council.

The ward has adopted a Ward Support Officer.

People living in the area tend see themselves as living in Erdington, Castle Bromwich, Birches Green or Castle Vale, people seldom say they live in Tyburn.
