= Birches Green =

Area of Tyburn, Birmingham, England

Coordinates: 52°30′56″N 1°49′42″W

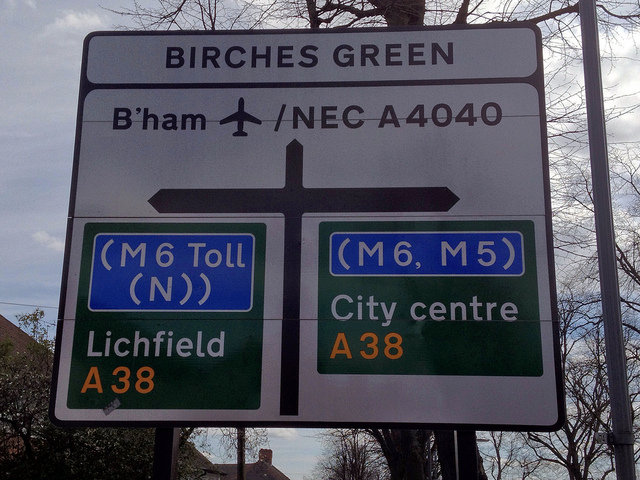
Birches Green sign

Birches Green () is a small area of Tyburn in Birmingham, England, within the parliamentary constitiuency of Erdington. It is located between Gravelly Hill, Erdington and the M6 motorway.

== Early history ==
The first mention of Birches Green dates from the 17th century and it may be named after the Birch family who lived in the area in the early 1600s. The green was located at the junction of the present day Kingsbury Road and Spring Lane (now the location of Ardenleigh and an entrance to Rookery Park.

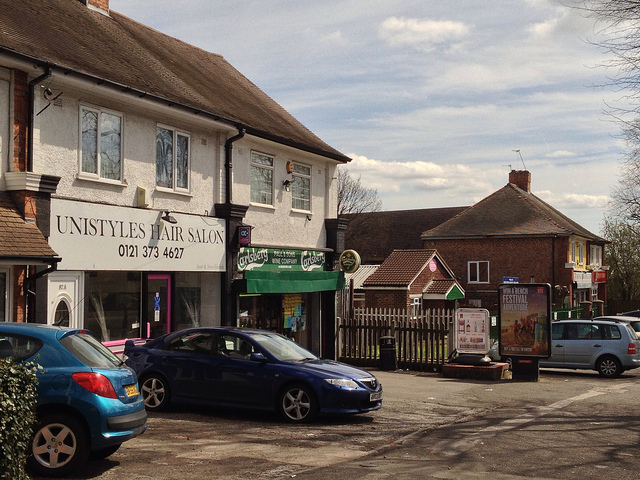
Shops on Bromford Lane, Birches Green

Historically Birches Green was part of Aston parish and consisted mostly of farmland, the farm being located at the junction of Kingsbury Road and Hall Road which survived until 1920. Birches Green is now mostly a residential area. In the early 1900s, the city council considered building a gas works in Birches Green on the site of the Glenthorne estate but these plans did not come to fruition and instead, a housing estate was built.

== Glenthorne Youth Treatment Centre ==
Glenthorne Youth Treatment Centre, which opened in 1978, provided long-term care for children aged between 12 and 18 who were "severely disturbed and disruptive" and was referred to in the media as "Britain's toughest jail for young offenders". The centre was built on the site of a large Victorian house called Glenthorne, built by a Mr Yates in 1877 though by 1908 it had already become a private asylum.

The centre was one of only two units in the country at the time and could accommodate 68 children though this was later reduced to 30. The centre consisted of a mixture of secure and open accommodation.

The centre attracted a deal of controversy over the years with a number of incidents reported in the media including female inmates sexually assaulted and being made pregnant by other inmates. Inspectors in 1991 reported that the centre was "in crisis with staff barely able to control the inmates" with security breaches and staff failing to search inmates for illegal substances. The centre was closed in 2002; the site is currently used by the Ardenleigh Adolescent Forensic Unit.

== Birches Green House / Rookery House ==
Rookery House, currently in Rookery Park in Erdington, was originally known as Birches Green House and dates from the 1730s. The house passed between a number of owners in the 18th and 19th centuries before it was renamed Rookery House by William Wiley, the pencil case manufacturer, in 1871. People who lived in Birches Green House included Barbara Spooner (who was born in Birches Green), who later married William Wilberforce.

In the 20th century, the house was purchased by the City of Birmingham Council and the surrounding gardens became Rookery Park. It is being converted into apartments.

== Education ==
Birches Green Primary School opened in 1929. It includes two adjoining schools, Birches Green Infants School and Birches Green Junior School. The school hosts the polling station in Birches Green for local and national elections and referendums.

== Other notable buildings / sites ==
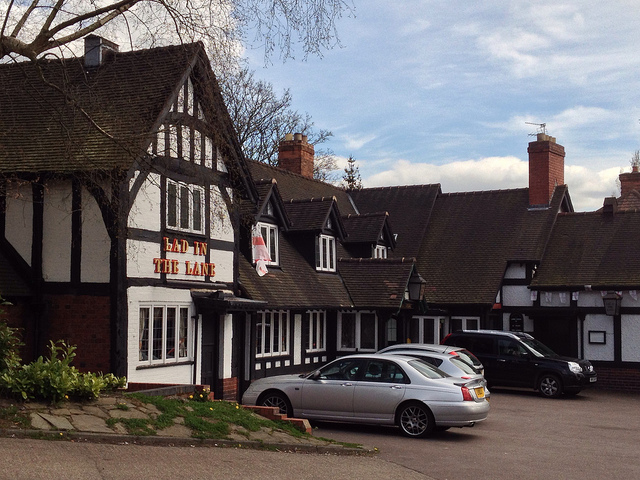
The Lad in the Lane

The Lad in the Lane pub (formerly known as The Old Green Man) is thought to be the oldest house in Birmingham dating from 1400. Surviving timbers from the current building have been dated to the end of the 14th century. Originally used as a home, it has been used as a public house since the 1780s.

Birches Green Evangelical Free Church is a small church located near to the Lad in the Lane pub, built on a former football ground.

Birches Green Allotments are based just off the Tyburn Road / Kingsbury Road junction and consists of 90 plots. Pupils from Birches Green School maintain their own plot on the site.
