= Kanishka Casket =

Buddhist reliquary in Peshawar Museum, Pakistan

Kanishka casket
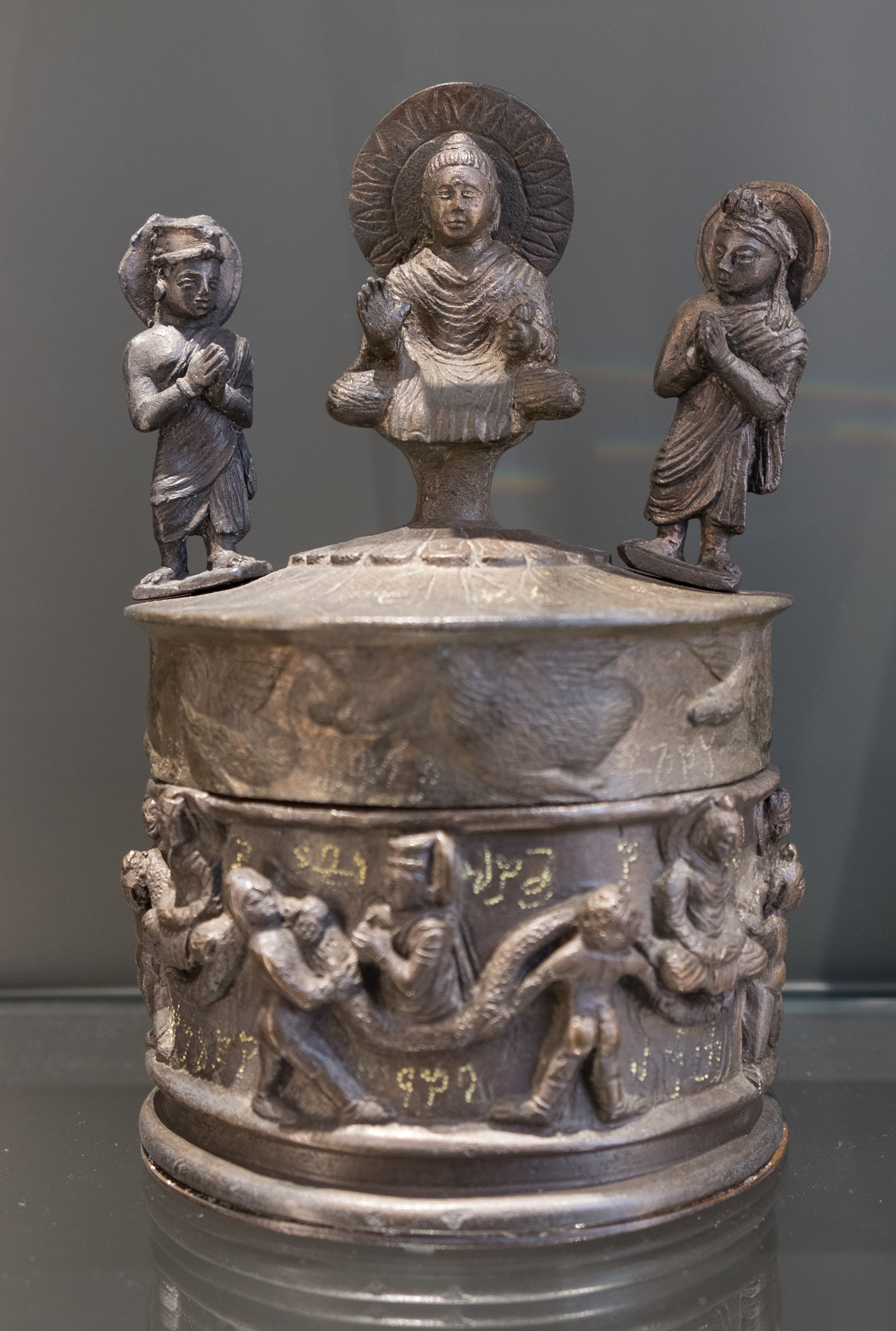
- The "Kanishka Casket", dated to 127 CE, with the Buddha surrounded by Indra and Brahma. Kanishka appears in the lower part among the scrolls, British Museum.
- Created: 2nd century CE
- Present location: Peshawar Museum, Pakistan (a copy is in British Museum, London)

Location
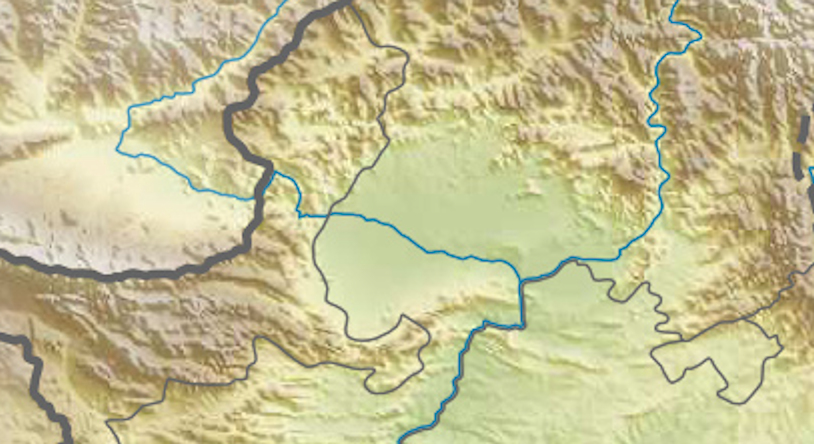

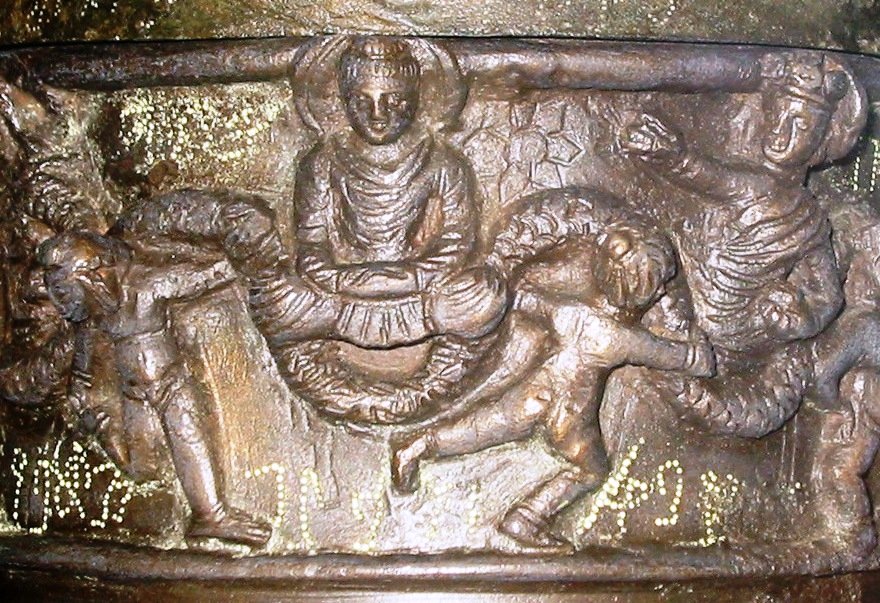
Detail of the Buddha, surrounded by cherubs, with devotee or bodhisattava

The Kanishka casket or Kanishka reliquary, is a Buddhist reliquary made in gilded copper, and dated to the first year of the reign of the Kushan emperor Kanishka, in 127 CE. It is now in the Peshawar Museum in the historic city of Peshawar, Pakistan.

== History and description ==
It was discovered in a deposit chamber under the monumental Kanishka stupa (described by Chinese pilgrims in the 7th century as the tallest stupa in all India), during the archeological excavations in 1908-1909 in Shah-ji-Dheri on the outskirts of Peshawar. It is said to have contained three bone fragments of the Buddha, which were forwarded to Burma by the British following the excavation, where they still remain. The reception and subsequent display of the relics was organized by the Burmese hermit U Khandi.

The casket is today at the Peshawar Museum, and a copy is in the British Museum. The casket is dedicated in Kharoshthi. The inscription reads:

Inscription of the Kanishka casket
Inscription	Original (Kharosthi script(Read from right to left))	Transliteration	English translation
Line 2	𐨐𐨞𐨁𐨮𐨿𐨐𐨤𐨂𐨪𐨅 𐨞𐨒𐨪𐨅 𐨀𐨩𐨎 𐨒𐨢𐨐𐨪𐨎𐨜𐨅 𐨨𐨱𐨪𐨗𐨯 𐨐𐨞𐨁	Kaṇiṣkapure ṇagare ayaṃ gadhakaraṃḍe maharajasa Kaṇi-	In Kaṇiṣkapura city, this incense box is the great king Kanishka's
Line 4	𐨮𐨿𐨐𐨯 𐨬𐨁𐨱𐨪𐨅 𐨨𐨱𐨯𐨅𐨣𐨯 𐨯𐨎𐨓𐨪𐨐𐨿𐨮𐨁𐨟𐨯 𐨀𐨒𐨁𐨭𐨫𐨣𐨬𐨐𐨪𐨿𐨨𐨁𐨀𐨣	ṣkasa vihare Mahasenasa Saṃgharakṣitasa agiśalanavakarmiana	monastery's superintendents of construction of the fire hall, Mahasena's and Saṃgharakṣita's,
Line 3	𐨡𐨅𐨩𐨢𐨪𐨿𐨨𐨅 𐨯𐨪𐨿𐨬𐨯𐨟𐨿𐨬𐨣 𐨱𐨁𐨟𐨯𐨂𐨱𐨪𐨿𐨠 𐨧𐨬𐨟𐨂	deyadharme sarvasatvana hitasuhartha bhavatu	donation. May it be for the benefit and pleasure of all living beings.
Line 1	𐨀𐨕𐨪𐨿𐨩𐨣 𐨯𐨪𐨿𐨬𐨯𐨿𐨟𐨁𐨬𐨟𐨁𐨣 𐨤𐨿𐨪𐨟𐨁𐨒𐨿𐨪𐨱𐨅	acaryana sarvastivatina pratigrahe	In the possession of the Sarvāstivādin teachers.

Originally it was believed, that the text is signed by the maker, a Greek artist named Agesilas, who oversaw work at Kanishka's stupas (caitya), confirming the direct involvement of Greeks with Buddhist realizations at such a late date: "The servant (dasa) Agisalaos, the superintendent of works at the vihara of Kanishka in the monastery of Mahasena" ("dasa agisala nava-karmi ana*kaniskasa vihara mahasenasa sangharame"). However, a recent cleaning of the casket had shown that the old reading was not accurate. Instead, the name is to be read agnisala, which is the refectory of the monastery.

The lid of the casket shows the Buddha on lotus pedestal, and worshipped by Indra and Brahma.

The edge of the lid is decorated by a frieze of flying geese, or hamsa, symbolizing the travel of departing souls and the removal from samsara. Some of the geese have a wreath of victory in their beak.

The body of the casket represents a Kushan monarch, probably Kanishka in person, with the Iranian Sun god and Moon god at his side. On the sides are two images of a seated Buddha, worshiped a royal figures, possibly a bodhisattava.

A garland, supported by cherubs goes around the scene in typical Hellenistic style.

The relics themselves were forwarded to Burma by the British in 1910 in order to safeguard them. They are today visible in Mandalay, in a museum at the base of Mandalay Hill. The three fragments of bone are believed to be true relics of Gautama Buddha.

== Gallery ==
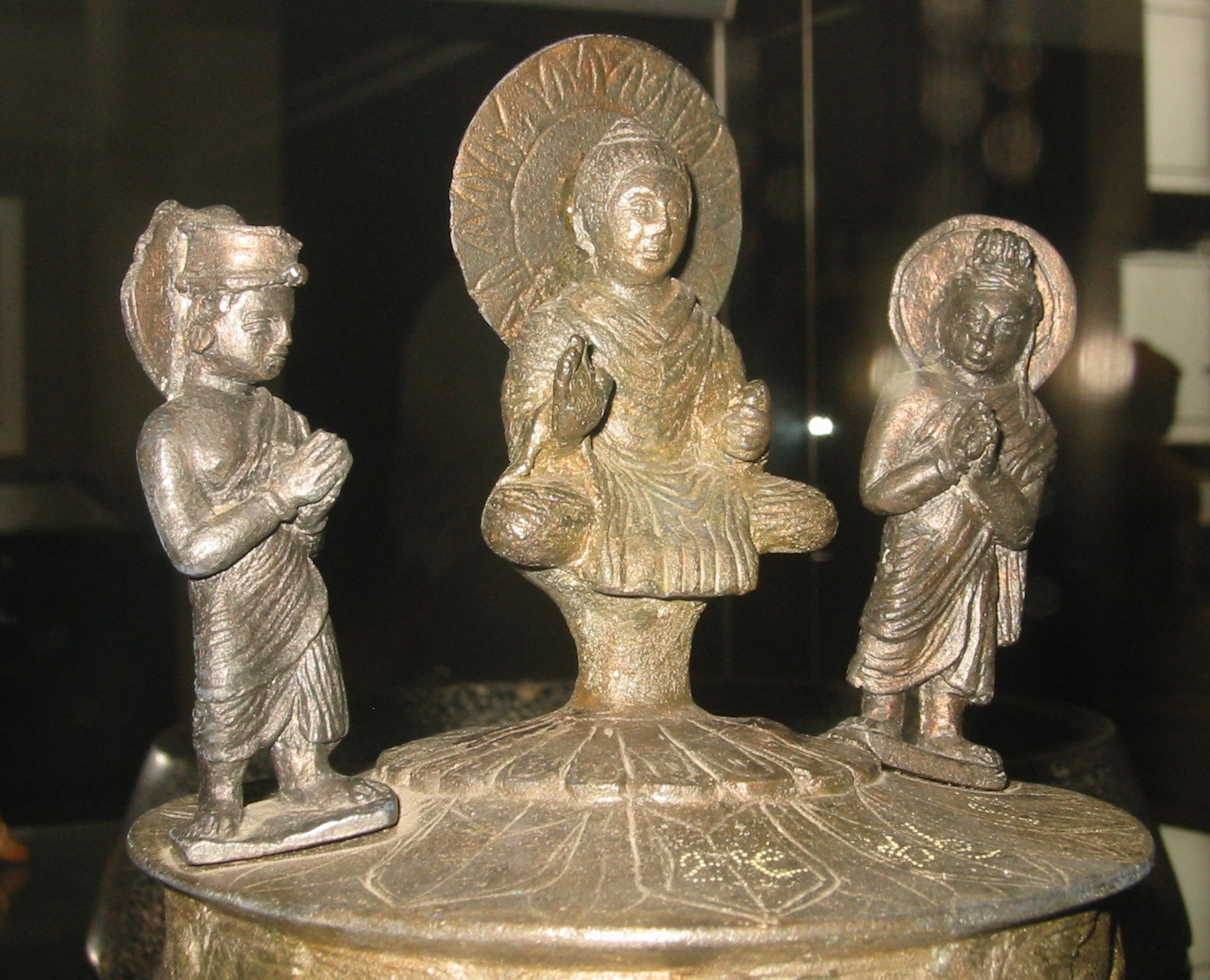
Detail of the Indra, Buddha, Brahma trilogy.

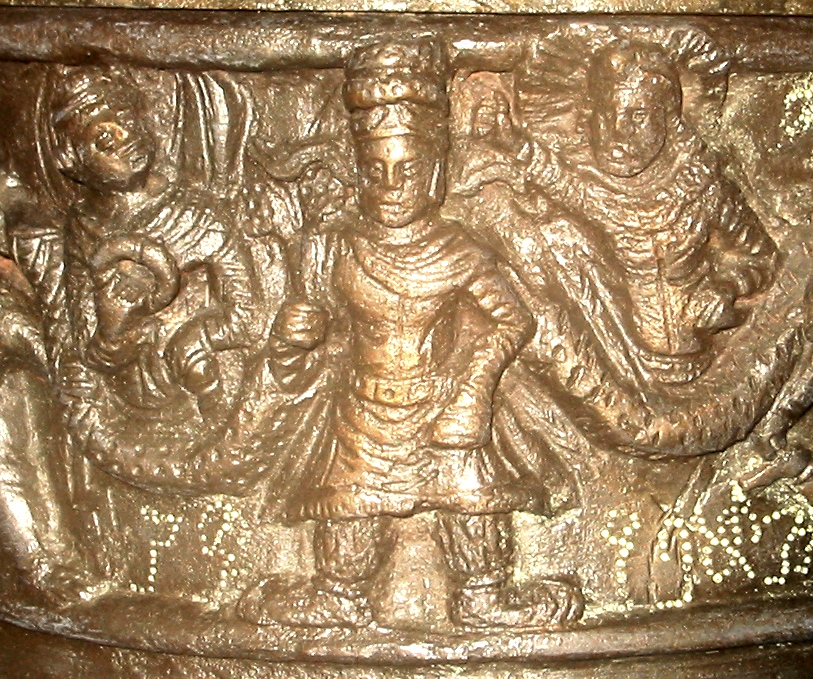
Detail of Kanishka, surrounded by the Sun-God and the Moon-God.

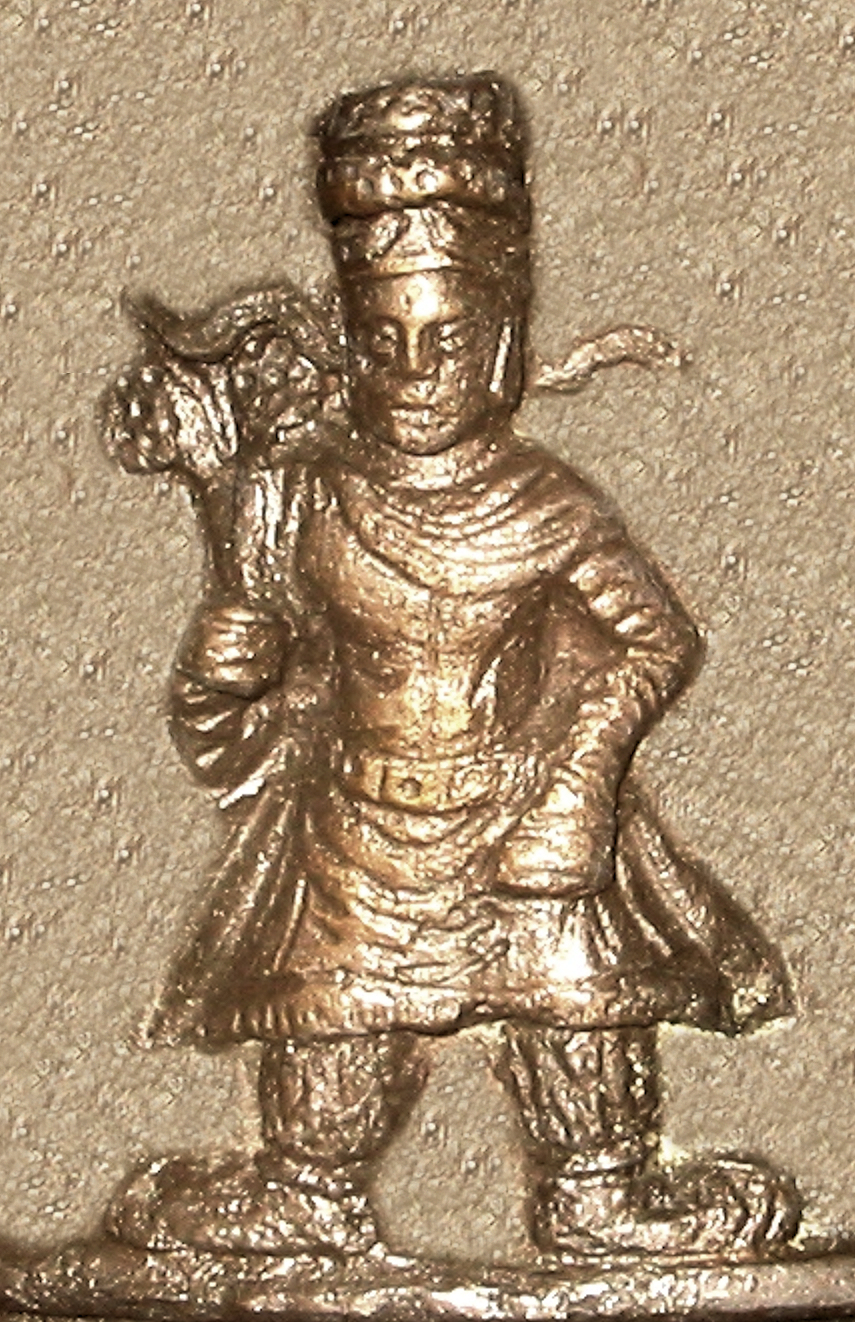
Kanishka in the Kanishka Casket (detail)

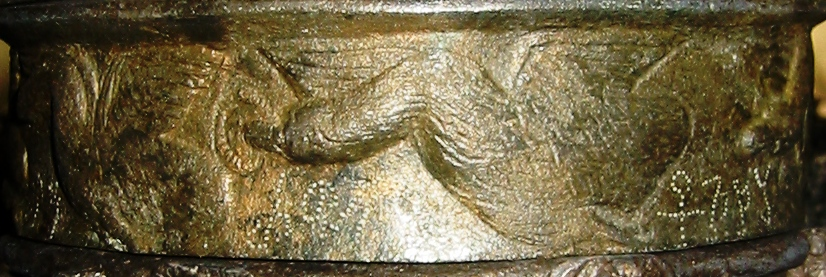
Detail of the flight of sacred geese, or hamsa.

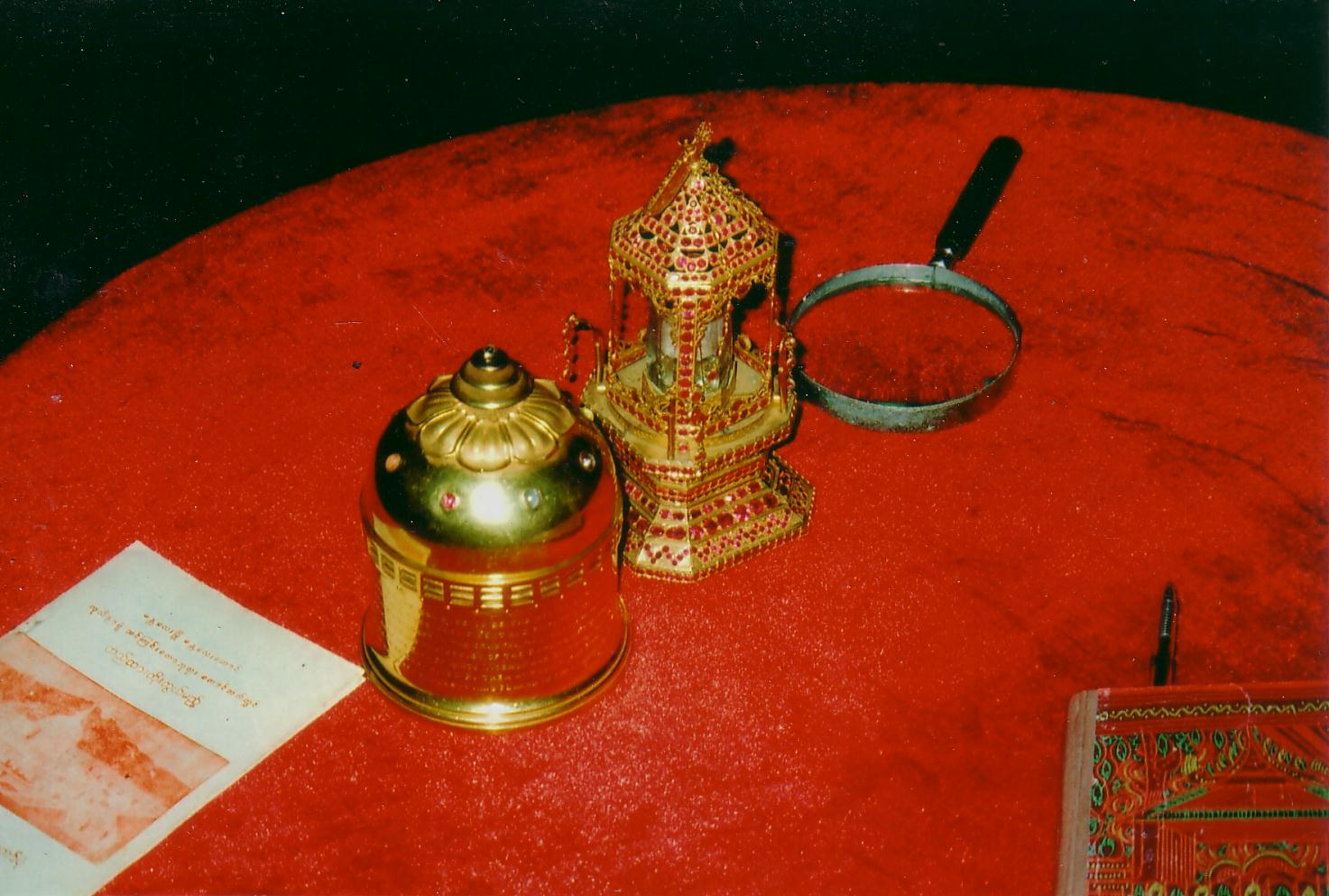
Buddha relics from Kanishka's stupa in Peshawar, Pakistan, sent by the British to Mandalay, Burma in 1910.

== See also ==
- Cetiya
- Bimaran reliquary
- Rukhuna reliquary
- Silver Reliquary of Indravarman
- Bajaur casket
- Kushan art
