= Clifford Spooner =

British water polo player

Personal information
- Nationality: British
- Born: 21 December 1933 (age 91); Newport, England

Sport
- Sport: Water polo

Clifford Spooner (born 21 December 1933) is a British water polo player. He competed in the men's tournament at the 1956 Summer Olympics.
