= David Brainerd Spooner =

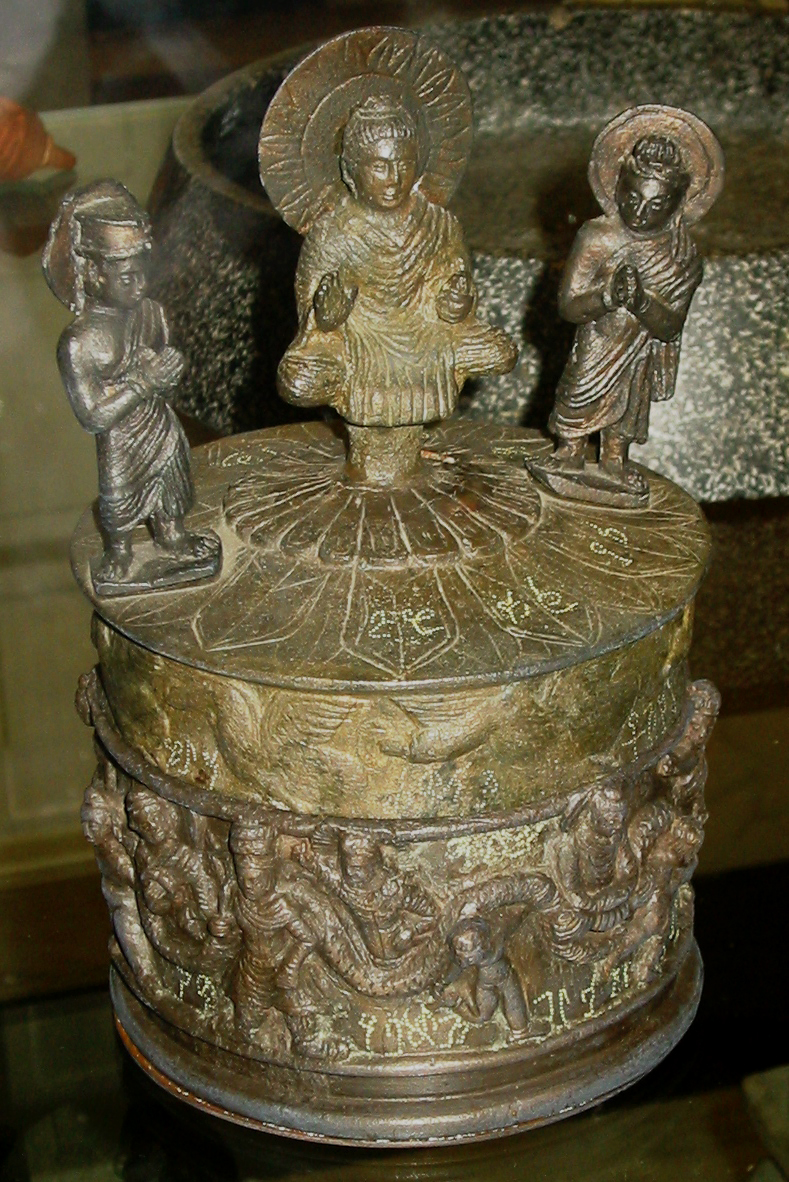
David Brainerd Spooner discovered the Kanishka Casket in Shah-ji-ki-Dheri.

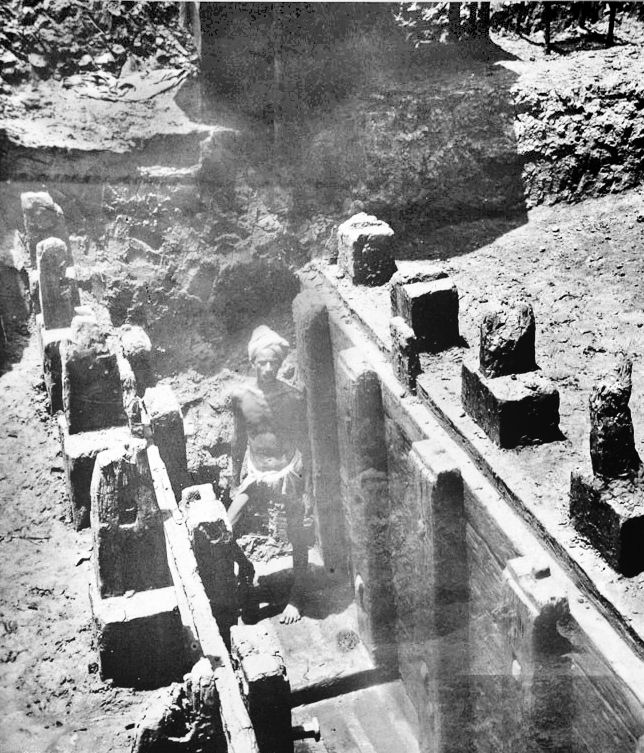
Excavation under Spooner of Mauryan remains of a wooden palissade at the Bulandi Bagh site, 1912-13.

David Brainerd Spooner (February 7, 1879 – January 30, 1925) was an American archaeologist and linguist. He was born at Vernon, Vermont.

== Life ==
Spooner graduated from Stanford University in 1899. Spooner first went to Japan to the Prefectural College of Omi at Ōtsu, as well as the School of Foreign languages, in Tokyo, and the Imperial University. He was the first foreigner to graduate from the Imperial University with a Literature diploma. He later attended the British Government College at Benares (1901–02) and the Sanskrit College in Benares, (1902–03). Finally, through a Harvard fellowship, he received a Ph.D. from Frederick William University in Berlin, 1906.

Spooner worked and wrote extensively in the areas of archaeology, Indian religion, Indian history, as well as languages and linguistics. In India, he worked for the British Archaeological Survey. As Superintendent, Frontier Circle, he excavated Buddhist sites at Sahri-Bahlol in 1906 and in Takht-i-Bahi in 1907. He was the discoverer of the Kanishka reliquary at Shaji-ki-Dheri in 1908-09. Later from 1910, as Superintendent, Eastern Circle, he excavated archaeological sites in Basrah (Vaisali), Patna (where he excavated the archaeological site of Kumhrar and small portions of Bulandi Bagh), and Nalanda. He also studied the architecture of the temples in the Mithila region. He identified a unique architectural aspect among several temples in the region and coined it as Tirhut style.

He assisted the Archaeological Survey of India Director General, John Marshall. In 1919 he was nominated Deputy Director General. For his works and services, he received an O.B.E.

Spooner died in Agra, India, at the age of 46, on January 30, 1925.

== Works ==
- The Zoroastrian period of Indian history, 1915
