= William Sewell (veterinary surgeon) =

Principal of the London Veterinary College

William Sewell (1781–1853) was the second principal of the London Veterinary College, succeeding Edward Coleman who died in 1839.

== Life ==
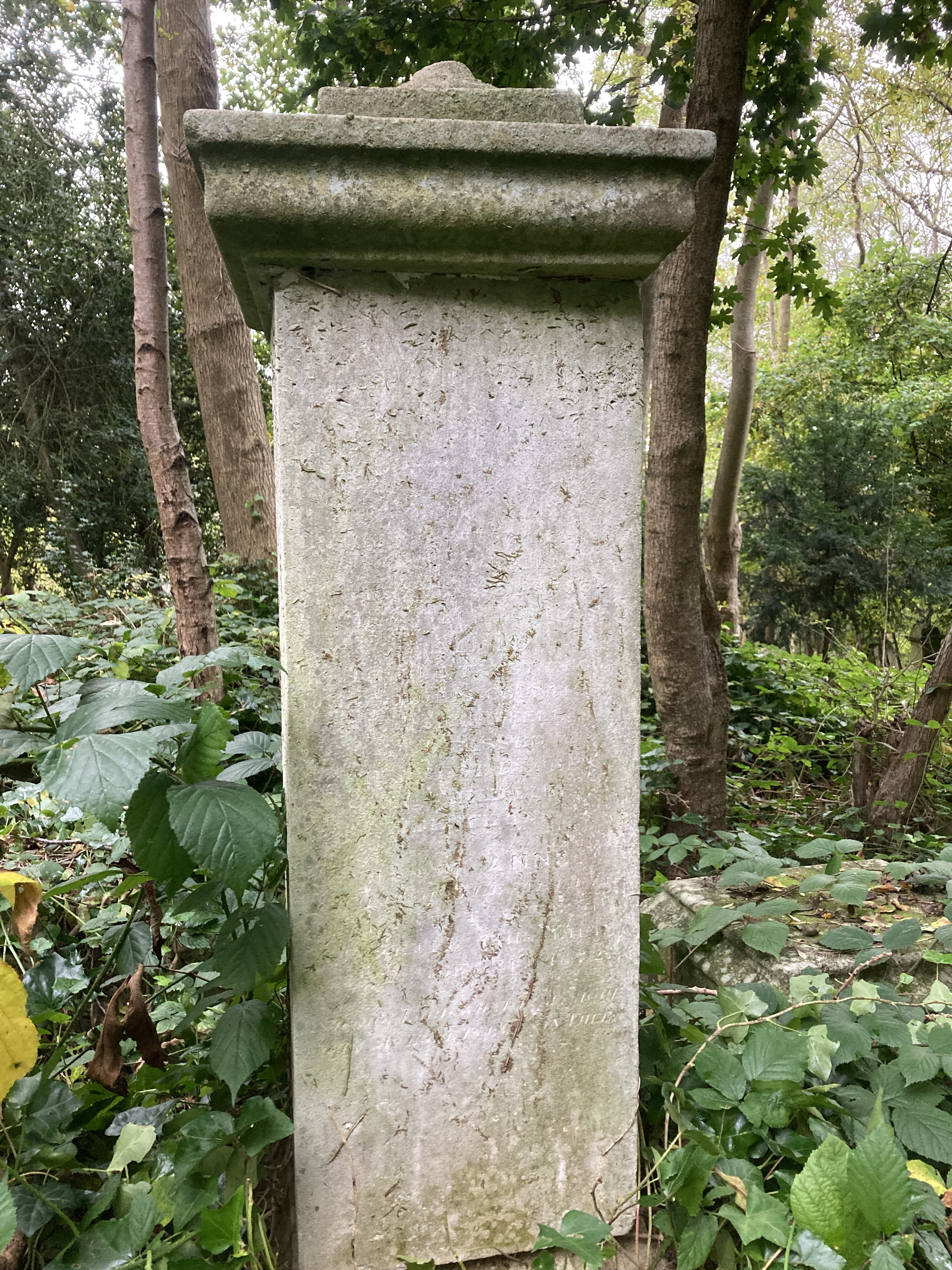
Grave of William Sewell in Highgate Cemetery

Sewell was the son of an Essex farmer and of Quaker descent. At age 15, he was apprenticed to Coleman and remained at the college for 57 years. In 1815 and 1816, he was sent by the college governors to the European continent to visit veterinary schools.

Upon graduation from the college at age 18, he was appointed demonstrator (e.g., professor) in Anatomy, and in 1803, he was named assistant professor. He was charged with maintaining discipline at the college. His life was devoted to the study of horses. His biographers described Sewell as a reserved man, unsociable, hesitating, and unpopular with the students and the profession. However, he remained loyal to Coleman.

He popularized the operation of neurectomy, the surgical removal of a nerve in horses, in 1817. In 1825, he reported that glanders was an infectious disease which affected horses’ lungs and reported that the cure for glanders was copper sulfate. In 1835, he introduced the operation of periosteum to treat splints and sprain in horses. He was considered an expert in lameness in horses. In 1829, he performed the first operation for bladder stones in horses.

Sewell gradually stopped teaching, and became the director of the London Veterinary School, its secretary, and its resident governor. In 1852, Sewell was elected president of the Royal College of Veterinary Surgeons.

He died in June 1853 at the age of 72 and was buried on the western side of Highgate Cemetery (plot no.386).

He married late in life and left no family.
