= Isaac Spooner =

English ironmaster & banker (1735-1816)

- Born: c.1735
- Died: 1816
- Occupations: ironmaster; banker
- Spouse: Barbara Gough

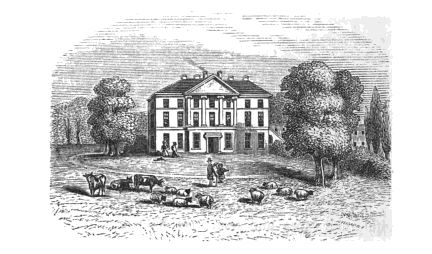
Elmdon Hall, 1863 engraving

Isaac Spooner (c.1735–1816) was an English ironmaster and banker who founded Birmingham Bank.

== Life ==
Spooner was born to Abraham Spooner and Anne Knight, he went into the family iron business based around a furnace at Aston, in the Birmingham area. In 1791 he founded a bank with Matthias Attwood the elder, known then as the Birmingham Bank, which became the largest private bank in Birmingham with a clientele mostly consisting of farmers and manufacturers. In 1801, Birmingham Bank opened a London branch called Spooner, Attwood & Holman. The bank Attwood, Spooner & Co. failed in 1865.

Spooner's views were evangelical and abolitionist. He owned an estate of over 2000 acres at Elmdon, West Midlands, where he completed Elmdon Hall, a development begun by his father Abraham in 1795, and which stood until its demolition in 1956. Elmdon Park remains in its place.

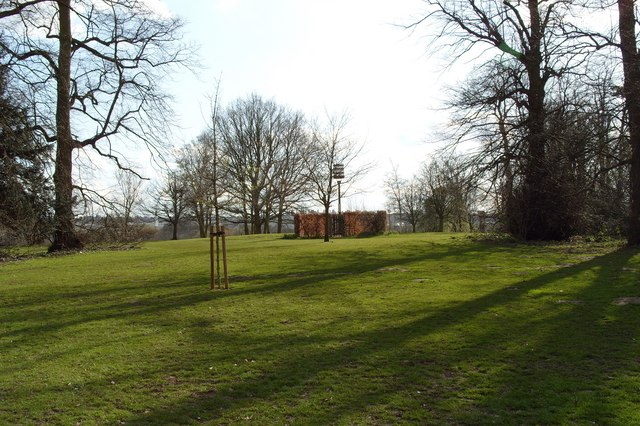
Elmdon Park today

== Family ==
Spooner married Barbara Gough, daughter of Sir Henry Gough, 1st Baronet, sister of Henry Gough-Calthorpe, 1st Baron Calthorpe and granddaughter of the MP Reynolds Calthorpe. They had children including:

- Abraham, who married the daughter of Luke Lillingston (great-nephew and heir of General Luke Lillingston) of Ferriby Grange, and took the name Abraham Spooner Lillingston.
- Isaac, who married Miss Tyler of Redland in 1807.
- Barbara Ann, who married William Wilberforce.
- Anne, who married Edward Vansittart, son of George Vansittart and Vicar of Taplow, as his second wife, and was mother of Edward Vansittart Neale.
- Henry, who attended Rugby School.
- William, who became Archdeacon of Coventry.
- Richard, who was a member of parliament. He married Charlotte, daughter of Nathan Wetherell.
- John, who was a clergyman.

There were nine in all, with the unmarried Eliza; or ten. Richard is said to be the ninth child in an 1885 Life of Thomas Attwood.
