= William Charles Spooner =

English veterinary surgeon

- Born: 1809? Blandford, Dorset, England
- Died: 3 May 1885
- Occupation: Veterinary surgeon

William Charles Spooner (1809? – 3 May 1885) was an English veterinary surgeon.

== Biography ==
Spooner was born about 1809 at Blandford, Dorset, where his father is said to have been an innkeeper. He is in no way related to the other veterinary surgeon with a similar name, Charles Spooner, with whom he has been frequently confused. He entered the Royal Veterinary College, obtaining his diploma 7 March 1829, and began to practise at Southampton, where he established a ‘Veterinary Infirmary, Forge, and Register Office for the sale of horses,’ at Vincent's Walk, Hanover Buildings. About 1845, however, he in great measure gave up his veterinary practice, and commenced, in partnership with Mr. Bennett, a manufacture of chemical manures at Eling Hill Farm. He subsequently purchased the ‘Old Bone Mill’ at Eling. Through his exertions the chemical manure works of Spooner & Bailey, probably the best at that time in the south of England, soon became widely known.

In 1840 he was appointed one of the committee ‘to watch over the interests of veterinary science,’ especially with a view to the establishment of a chartered college of veterinary surgeons. He lectured constantly before various clubs and societies in Hampshire and the adjoining counties. He was a frequent contributor to the earlier numbers of the ‘Journal’ of the Royal Agricultural Society, and gained the society's prizes for two essays—‘On the Use of Superphosphate of Lime produced with Acid and Bones for Manure’ (Journal, 1846, vii. 143), and ‘On the Management of Farm Horses’ (ib. 1848, ix. 249). In 1852 a prize offered by the Bath and West of England Agricultural Society for an essay ‘On the most Economical and Profitable Method of growing and consuming Root Crops’ was awarded to him. This essay was printed among the society's proceedings for 1854 (Journal, ii. 1). In the same year a water drill of his invention was exhibited at Pusey, and received much praise (ib. p. 193). Towards the end of his life Spooner concentrated his attention very largely on the manufacture of superphosphate and other artificial manures. He suffered greatly throughout life from deafness, which at last necessitated his retirement in great measure from active life. He died of paralysis on 3 May 1885 at his residence at Eling.

Spooner was an excellent judge of horses, and was frequently seen in the ‘ring’ at agricultural shows. He was most widely known for his work on ‘Sheep.’ He wrote:

- ‘A Treatise on the Influenza of Horses,’ 1837, in great part a compilation giving ‘the experience of many eminent veterinary surgeons,’ including Professor Sewell, Youatt, and Charles Spooner.
- ‘A Treatise on the Structure, Functions, and Diseases of the Foot and Leg of the Horse,’ 1840, which has been erroneously attributed to Professor Charles Spooner.
- ‘The History, Structure, Economy, and Diseases of the Sheep,’ 1844, a standard work of which a new (third) edition, ‘considerably enlarged,’ appeared thirty years later. The work was undertaken largely owing to Youatt's recommendation, aiming at more condensed and practical treatment than had been the case in Youatt's own treatise on sheep, issued seven years previously in the ‘Library of Useful Knowledge.’
- ‘A Treatise on Manures,’ 1847.

For the ‘Encyclopædia Metropolitana,’ at the instance of Professor Sewell, Spooner wrote an article on ‘Veterinary Art,’ which was subsequently issued as a separate treatise. Spooner also contributed to John Morton's ‘Encyclopædia of Agriculture,’ which was published between 1848 and 1853. He edited and in part rewrote, in 1842, White's two treatises, ‘A Compendium of Cattle Medicine’ and ‘A Compendium of the Veterinary Art.’ Among his minor contributions, which cover a wide range of agricultural topics, may be mentioned papers on ‘Cross-breeding in Sheep and Horses,’ ‘The Capabilities of the New Forest,’ ‘The Failure of the Turnip Crop,’ &c.
