= William Wycliffe Spooner =

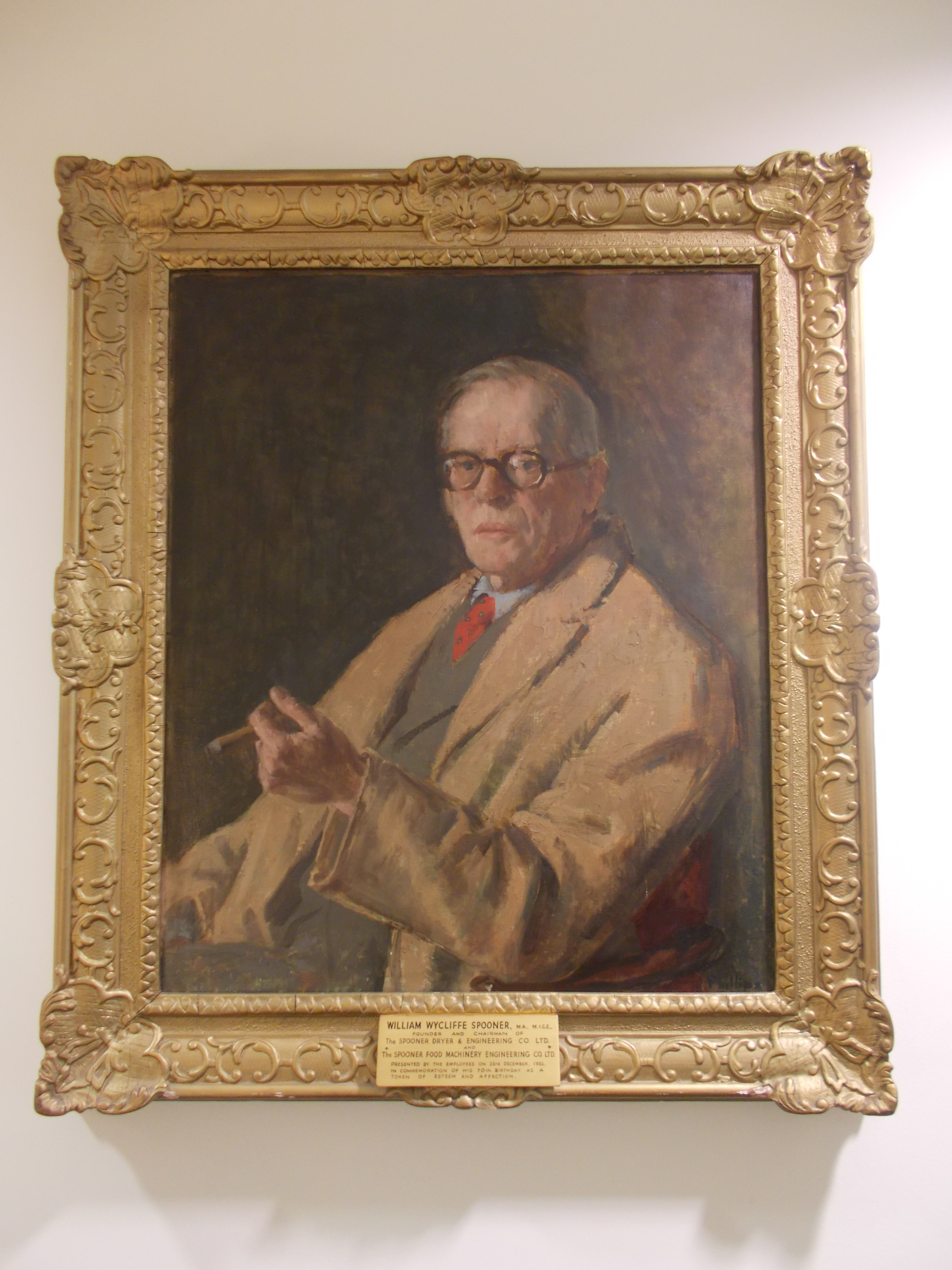
- Born: William Wycliffe Spooner; 29 March 1882; Oxford
- Died: 17 September 1967 (aged 85); Ilkley
- Education: Trinity College
- Spouse: Marian Edleston (m. 1920)

William Wycliffe Spooner (29 March 1882 – c. 17 September 1967) was the son of Dr. William Archibald Spooner and Frances Wycliffe nee Goodwin. He created the Spooner Dryer and Engineering Company in 1932 in Ilkley, West Yorkshire, England.

== Personal life ==
Born in Oxford in 1882, William Spooner studied engineering at Trinity College, Cambridge before beginning an apprenticeship with The British Westinghouse Electric and Manufacturing Company in Manchester in 1902. On 23 November 1905 he received his certificate of completion, recognising him as "competent to follow his career as a mechanical engineer". Various engineering jobs followed, including one studying Diesel engines in Germany before he became an associate member of the Institution of Civil Engineers in 1910.

He married Marian Edleston, the daughter of a Halifax, West Yorkshire mill owner in 1920 and they began living in Ilkley, a town in West Yorkshire. Their only son William ("Billy") Edleston Spooner was born in 1921. Marian died in 1938 and his son Billy was killed on a bombing raid whilst serving in the Royal Air Force in 1941. He remarried in 1954 to Mercie ("Mouse") Milling.

== The Spooner Dryer and Engineering Company ==
William Spooner started his company after detecting a niche for the production and sale of industrial drying equipment. His intent was to increase the speed and efficiency of industrial drying. He achieved this by applying the principles of forced convection to industrial drying and textile applications.

The Spooner Dryer and Engineering Company started in a one-room building in Shipley, West Yorkshire, in 1932 when Spooner was fifty years old. He employed two men, as well as a 16-year-old-school leaver as his secretary – Arthur B Rooks – who later became a director of the company. Initially, the company emphasized improving the textile industry's drying processes; later it became involved with the paper trade. After three years the company outgrew its premises in Shipley and Spooner bought part of a small mill in Yeadon and relocated his company there. The beginning of World War II delayed the company's expansion but after the war the expansion continued.

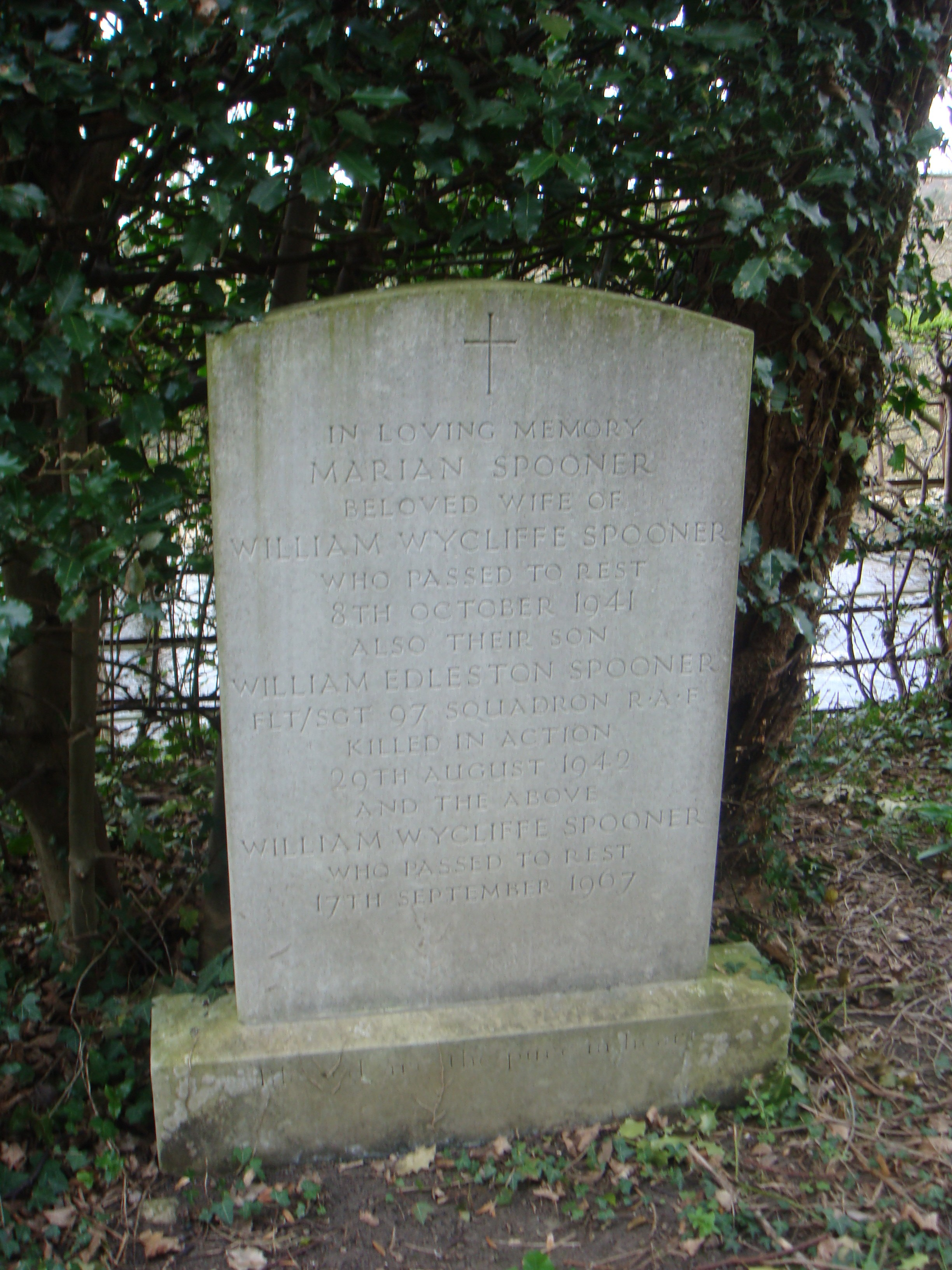
Gravestone of William Wycliffe Spooner, Ilkley Cemetery.

Spooner began to explore the possibility of applying the drying technique he had evolved for textiles to the food industry. He developed the Spooner Food Machinery Company, a subsidiary of the Spooner Dryer and Engineering Company, which began full production in 1949. He later acquired Ilkley Hall as offices for the food company, but he also developed part of it into a recreational and social facility for his employees.

In 1952, for his 70th birthday, his employees presented him with an oil painting portrait of himself by Patrick E. Philips as a token of their esteem and affection. Throughout his 70s of age, Spooner was still involved actively with the businesses he had started and became known as "The Industrial Peter Pan". In 1951 with the company's further expansion he bought the old Brewery Company in Ilkley as the new home for his parent company, and an adjoining old corn mill was converted into a drawing office block. Originally housed in a disused chapel in Hunslet, Leeds, The Spooner Food Machinery Company relocated to the Carlton Works in Armley, Leeds in 1956. By 1957 Spooner's companies were producing machinery for the textile, paper, paperboard, leather, nylon, fiberglass and mine belting trades, employing 300 people and having subsidiaries in North America and South Africa.

In 1959, the group became a public company with the name "Spooner Industries Ltd". Spooner retired as chairman in 1962, but remained as life president, actively involved until his death in 1967. He died peacefully at his home, Ashbrook, in Ilkley on 17 September 1967 and was buried in Ilkley cemetery along with his first wife and their son. At the time of his death he had hundreds of patents to his name.

Spooner was a funder of local causes, and in 1962 established his charitable trust: W.W. Spooner Charitable Trust.

Spooner and his wife Mercie were collectors of British drawings and watercolours. Their collection was bequeathed jointly to the Courtauld Institute of Art upon his death, and was published in the book The Spooner Collection of British Watercolours in 2006.
