= Charles Spooner (veterinary surgeon) =

English veterinary surgeon

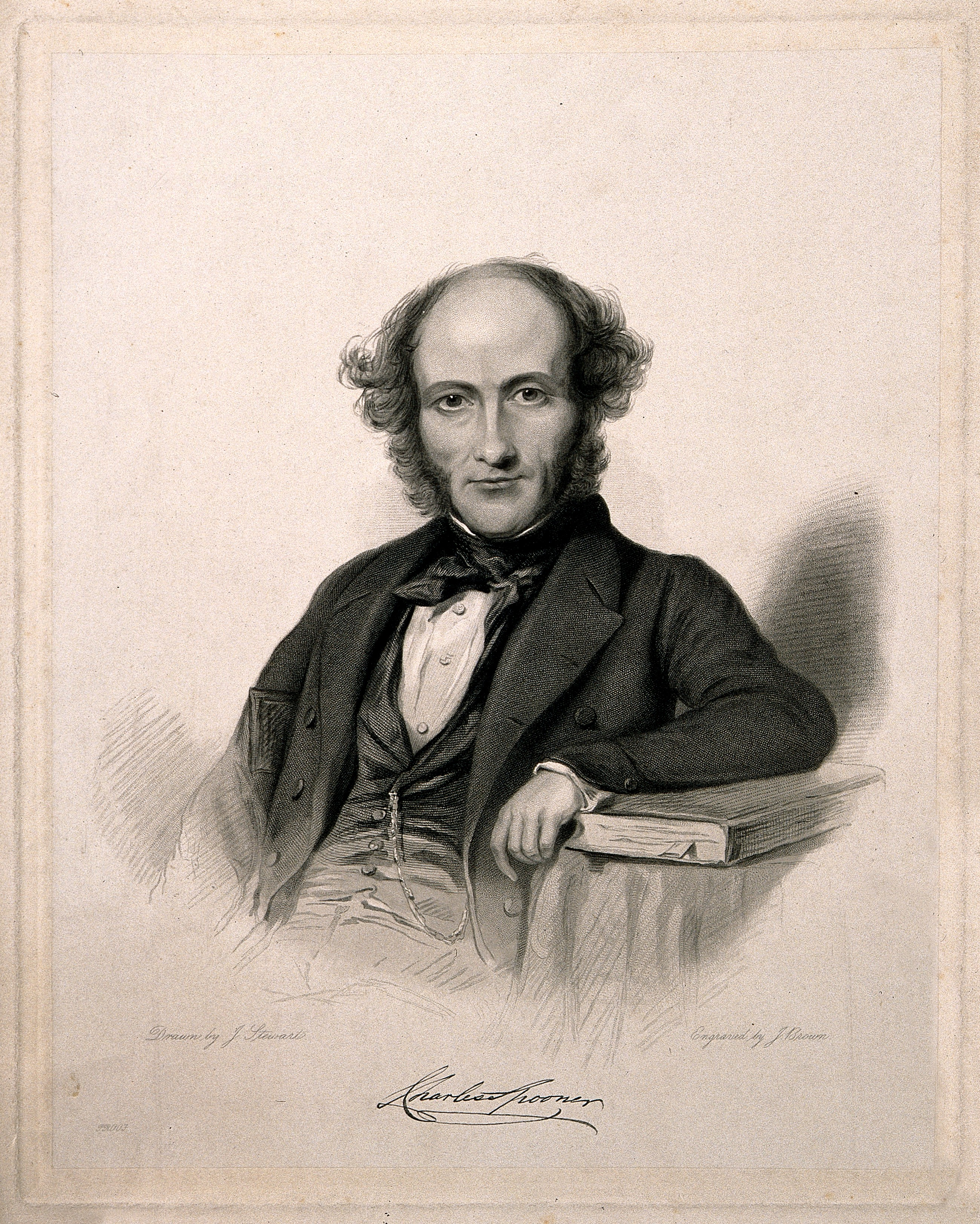
- Born: 19 October 1806
- Died: 24 November 1871 (aged 65)
- Occupation: Veterinary surgeon

Charles Spooner (19 October 1806 – 24 November 1871) was an English veterinary surgeon.

== Biography ==
Spooner was born 19 October 1806, was youngest of the three sons of William Spooner of Fordham, Essex. His father at the time of his birth occupied the dairy farm at Mistley Park, Mannington, having removed there from Yorkshire. On leaving school, Spooner was apprenticed to a chemist, George Jervis of Westbar, Sheffield, and at the expiration of his term entered the Royal Veterinary College, as a student, November 1828. He obtained his diploma 21 July 1829, and shortly afterwards was appointed, chiefly through the influence of Professor Sewell, veterinary surgeon to the Zoological Society, a post in which he was soon succeeded by William Youatt. About the same time, beginning 3 November 1834 (Veterinarian, 1834, vii. 665), he delivered private lectures and demonstrations on veterinary anatomy in his rooms near the college. Spooner was already ‘well known as one of the best veterinary anatomists, perhaps the best, of which the profession could boast’ (ib. 1835, viii. 646), and thus a gap which had long existed in the official college training was efficiently filled. Early in 1839 he reluctantly accepted the post of demonstrator of anatomy at the college and broke up his private classes. His advancement at the college was rapid. In the same year he became assistant professor in the place of Sewell, who was now made principal of the college on the death of the former chief, Professor Coleman (1764–1839). Spooner delivered his first lecture on 19 Nov. (ib. 1839, xii. 817). Spooner was associated with Professor Sewell (1780–1853) in the formation, in 1836, of the Veterinary Medical Association, of which he became treasurer, and in 1839 president, an office to which he was subsequently re-elected annually. In 1842 he became deputy professor of the college, and in 1853, on the death of Professor Sewell, principal and chief professor, with residence in the college. He now stood at the head of his profession, and in 1858 became president of the incorporated Royal College of Veterinary Surgeons. (ib. 1858, xxxi. 349).

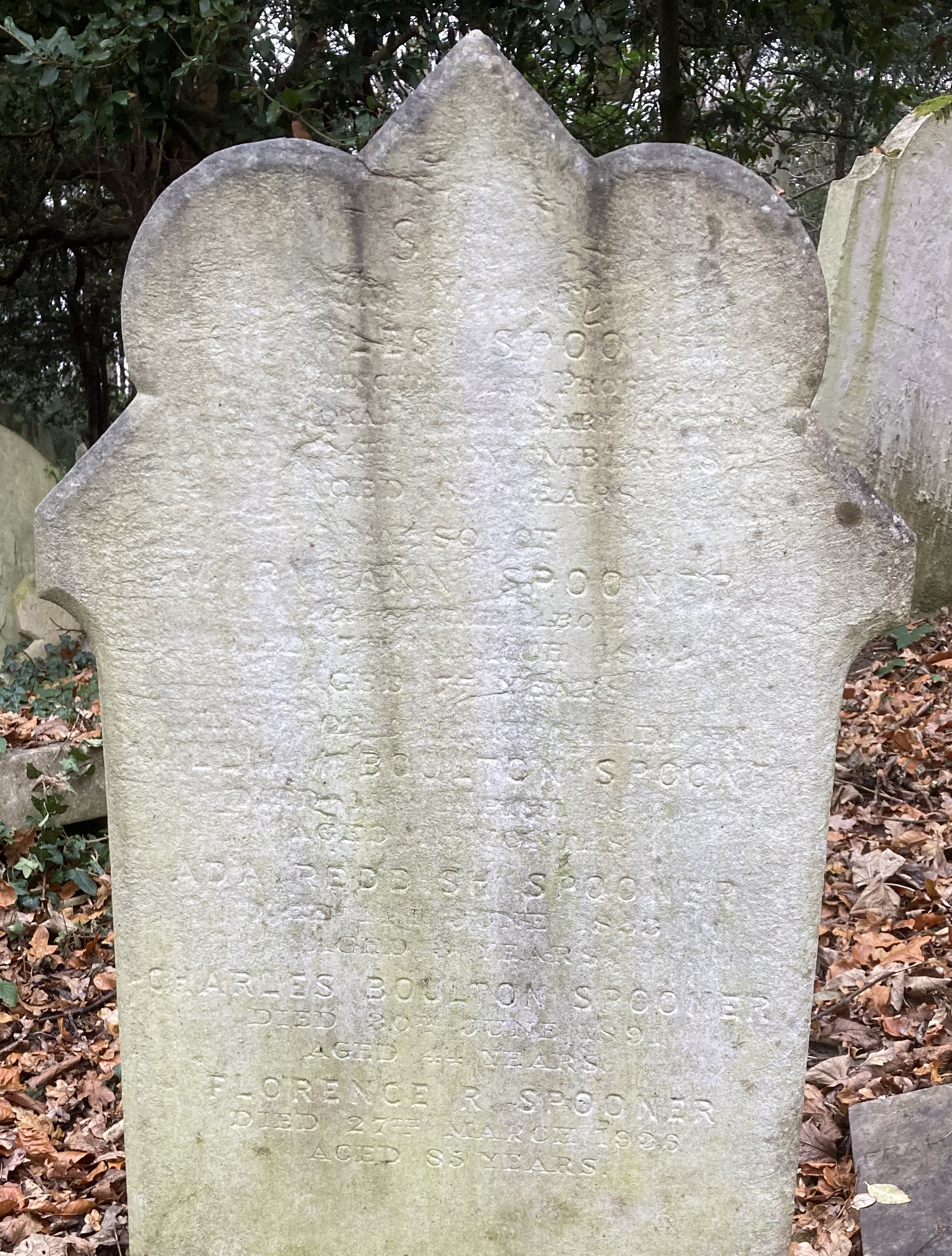
Grave of Charles Spooner in Highgate Cemetery

In 1865 Spooner was a member of the cattle plague commission. His judgment was frequently appealed to in the law courts (cf. Lancet, 16 December 1871). Dying on 24 November 1871, he was buried in Highgate cemetery. He married early in 1840 a Miss Boulton of Manchester, and left a family of five sons and three daughters. Though for some time joint editor of the ‘Veterinary Review,’ Spooner wrote little. It was rather as an operator, where he was aided by his accurate knowledge of anatomy, as a lecturer, and as a demonstrator on anatomy, that his talent was shown. Numerous reports of Spooner's speeches and lectures may be found in the ‘Veterinarian,’ the ‘Proceedings of the Veterinary Medical Association,’ &c. A lecture by him on ‘Horses,’ delivered before the members of the Farringdon Agricultural Library, was published in pamphlet form in 1861 (wrongly placed in the British Museum catalogue under the name of William Charles Spooner).
