= William Archibald Spooner =

Oxford don (1844–1930)

The Reverend William Archibald Spooner
- Examining Chaplain to the Bishop of Peterborough (1902-16); Chaplain to Archbishop Archibald Campbell Tait (from 1878 to 1882)
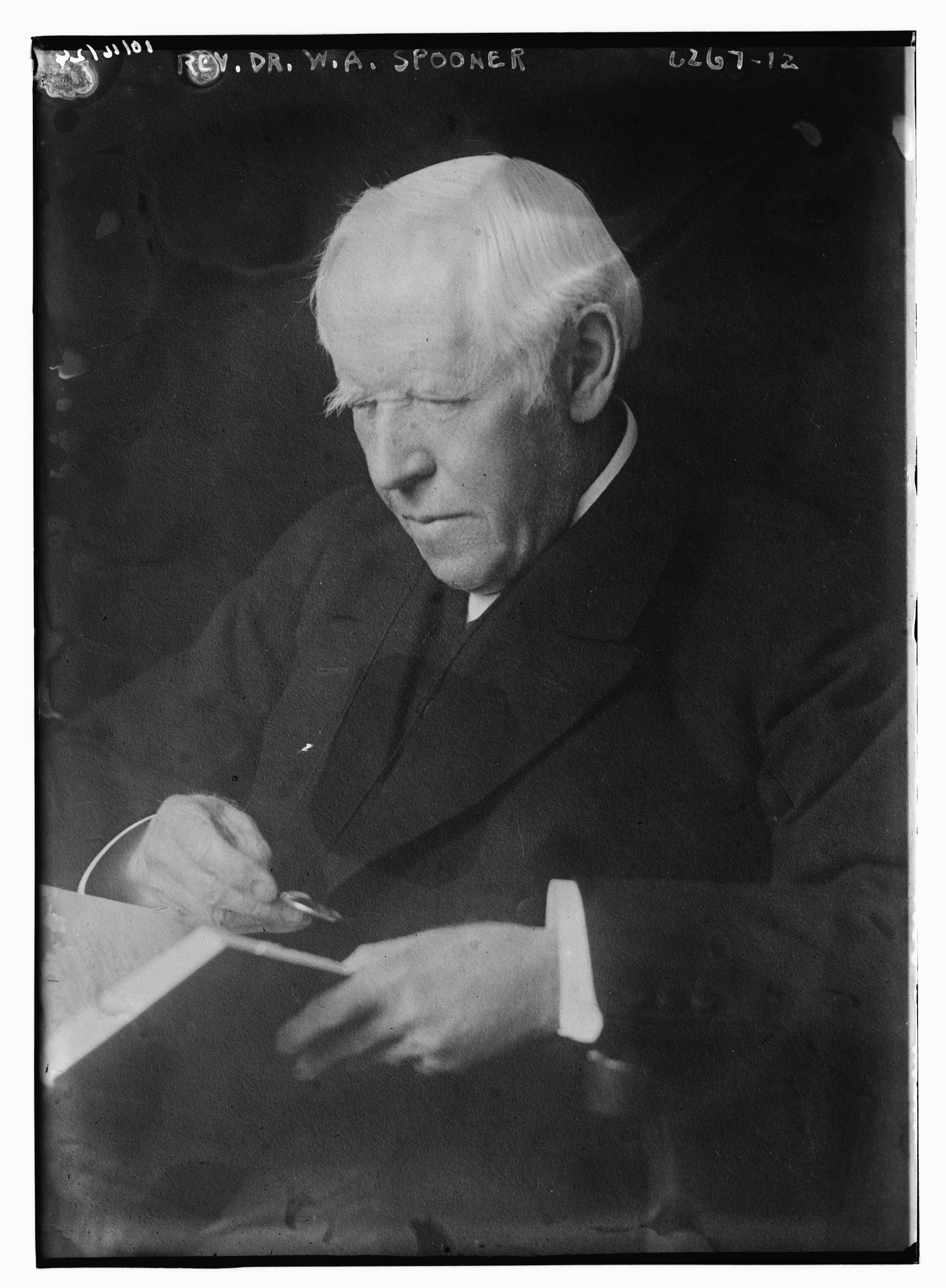
- Spooner in 1924
- Church: Church of England
- Province: Canterbury
- Diocese: Oxford (1872–1902); Peterborough (1902-16)
- Other posts: Warden of New College, Oxford (1903-24)
- Previous posts: Dean of New College, Oxford (1876–1889); fellow (1867), lecturer (1868), tutor (1869),

Orders
- Ordination: 1872 (as deacon); 1875 (as priest) by John Fielder Mackarness

Personal details
- Born: William Archibald Spooner; 22 July 1844 London, England, United Kingdom of Great Britain and Ireland
- Died: 29 August 1930 (aged 86) Oxford, England, United Kingdom of Great Britain and Northern Ireland
- Parents: Jane Lydia Wilson (mother); William Spooner (father)
- Spouse: Frances Wycliffe Goodwin (m. 1878)
- Children: William Wycliffe; Frances Catharine; Rosemary; Ellen Maxwell; Agnes Mary
- Profession: Priest, Academician
- Education: Oswestry School; New College, Oxford
- Known for spoonerisms

40th Warden of New College, Oxford
- In office 1903–1924
- Preceded by: James Edwards Sewell
- Succeeded by: Herbert Fisher

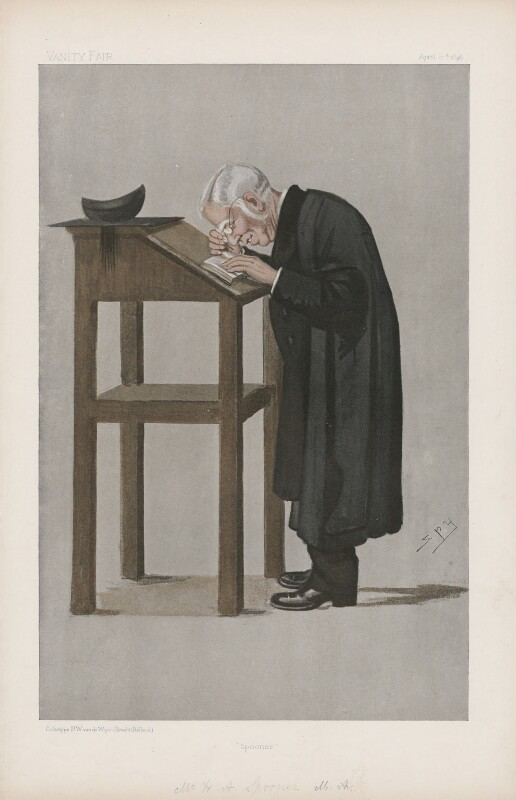
Spooner as caricatured by Spy (Leslie Ward) in Vanity Fair, April 1898

William Archibald Spooner (22 July 1844 – 29 August 1930) was a British clergyman and long-serving Oxford don. He was most notable for his absent-mindedness, and for supposedly mixing up the syllables in a spoken phrase, with unintentionally comic effect. Such phrases became known as spoonerisms, and are often used humorously. Many spoonerisms have been invented and attributed to Spooner.

== Life and career ==
William Archibald Spooner was born on 22 July 1844 at 17 Chapel Street, Grosvenor Place, London. He was the eldest son of William Spooner and Jane Lydia nee Wilson, who were married in Leeds in Q4 1841. He was educated at Oswestry School (where he was a contemporary of Frederick Gustavus Burnaby) and New College, Oxford, even though he was not a Wykehamist.

He was ordained deacon in the Church of England in 1872 and priest in 1875. In 1878, he became chaplain to Archbishop Archibald Tait.

William Spooner married Frances Wycliffe Goodwin on 12 September 1878. They had five children: William Wycliffe, Frances Catharine, Rosemary, Ellen Maxwell, and Agnes Mary.

Spooner remained at New College for more than sixty years, serving as fellow (1867), lecturer (1868), tutor (1869), dean (1876–1889) and warden (1903–1924). He lectured on ancient history, divinity and philosophy (especially on Aristotle's ethics).

Spooner was well liked and respected, described as "an albino, small, with a pink face, poor eyesight, and a head too large for his body". It was said that "his reputation was that of a genial, kindly, hospitable man". In the opinion of Roy Harrod, Spooner exceeded all the heads of Oxford and Cambridge colleges he had known "having regard to his scholarship, devotion to duty, and wisdom".

Spooner died on 29 August 1930.

== Spoonerisms ==
Spooner became famous for his manner of speaking, real or alleged "spoonerisms", plays on words in which corresponding consonants, vowels, or morphemes are switched. Few, if any, of his own spoonerisms were deliberate, and many of those attributed to him are apocryphal; in 1928, The New York Times described them as a "myth principally invented by" one of his former students, Robert Seton, who subsequently collaborated with Arthur Sharp on the first book of spoonerisms.

Spooner is said to have disliked the reputation gained for getting his words muddled. Maurice Bowra, who had been another of his students, commented that Spooner "was sensitive to any reference to the subject." He described being part of a group that gathered outside Spooner's window one evening, calling for a speech; Spooner replied "You don't want a speech. You only want me to say one of those things," and refused to comment further.

The Oxford Dictionary of Quotations (3rd edition, 1979) lists only one substantiated spoonerism: "The weight of rages will press hard upon the employer." (rate of wages) In a 1928 interview, Spooner himself admitted to uttering "Kinkering Congs Their Titles Take" (Conquering Kings). Spooner called this hymn out from the pulpit in 1879.

Many other quotations, "probable and improbable, were invented" and attributed to Spooner, including:

- "It is kisstomary to cuss the bride" (It is customary to kiss the bride)
- "I am tired of addressing beery wenches" (I am tired of addressing weary benches)
- "Mardon me padam, this pie is occupewed. Can I sew you to another sheet?" (Pardon me madam, this pew is occupied. Can I show you to another seat?)
- "You have hissed all my mystery lectures, and were caught fighting a liar in the quad" (You have missed all my history lectures, and were caught lighting a fire in the quad)
- "You have tasted two worms" (You have wasted two terms)
- "You will leave by the next town drain" (You will leave by the next down train)

Spooner is supposed to have committed other absent-minded gaffes. He was said to have invited a don to tea, "to welcome Stanley Casson, our new archaeology Fellow". "But, sir", the man replied, "I am Stanley Casson". "Never mind", Spooner said, "Come all the same".

On his death, The Times recorded that "He was not afraid of conversation".

== Works ==
- The Moral Philosophy Of Aristotle (1879)
- Bishop Butler (1901)

== See also ==
- Absent-minded professor
- Malapropism
