= Birmingham Baths Committee =

Former public body in Birmingham, England

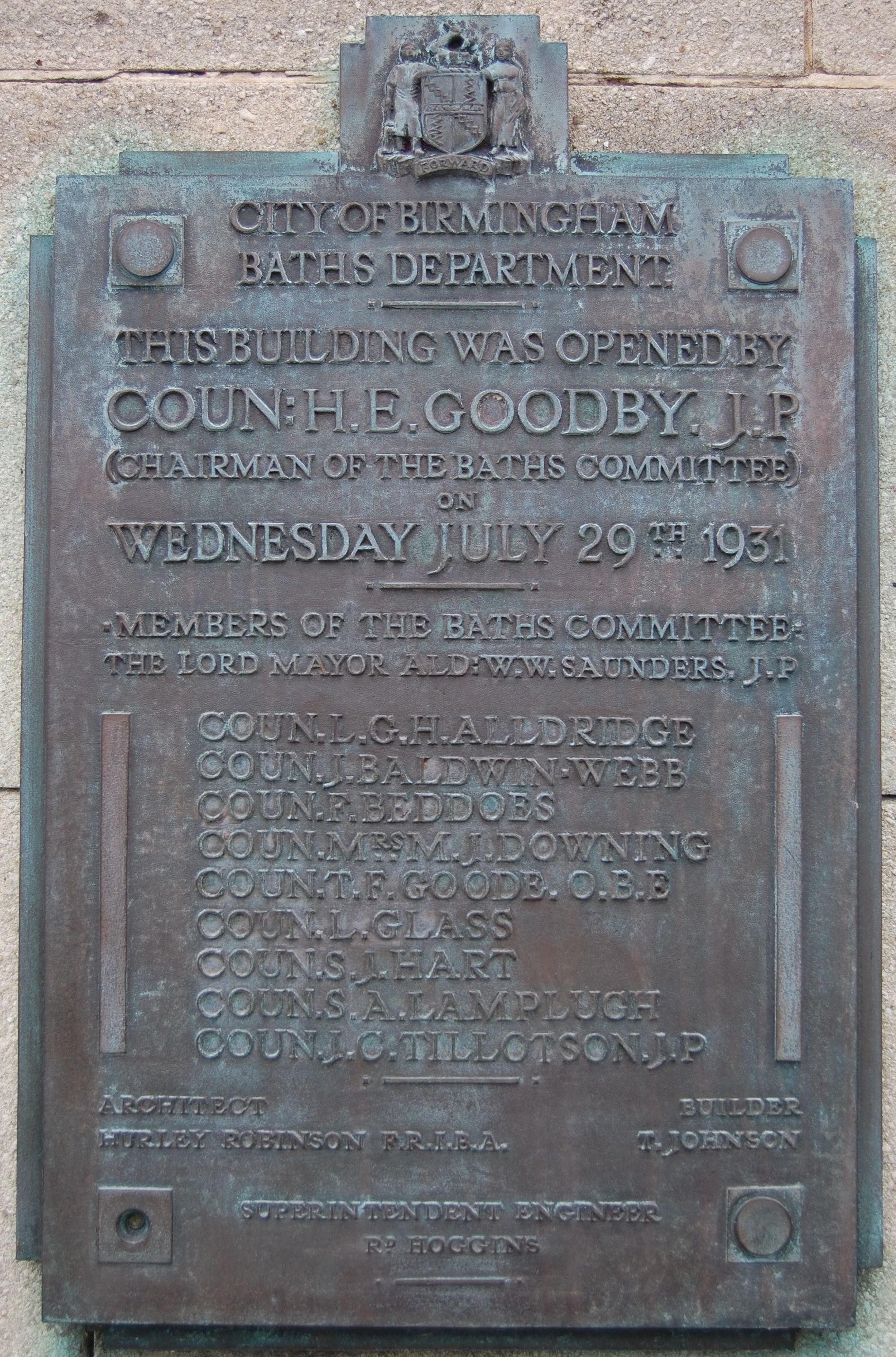
Plaque on Sparkhill Baths, showing membership of the committee as at July 1931.

The Birmingham Baths Committee was an organisation responsible for the provision and maintenance of public swimming and bathing facilities. Birmingham City Council funded, constructed and ran bathing facilities throughout the city. The movement to develop baths and wash houses in Britain had its impetus with the rapid urbanisation of the Industrial Revolution, which was felt acutely in Birmingham, one of England's powerhouses.

In the planning procedures before the construction of a swimming bath, the department regularly partnered with the Free Libraries Committee to provide a new swimming bath alongside a new public library.

== Establishment ==
=== Private baths ===
Birmingham had been provided with swimming baths for some time before the establishment of the Birmingham Baths Committee, which became possible through the introduction of an Act of Parliament. These baths were private and members were often only the wealthy who were able to pay for the service.

The baths received water from natural resources, often springs, which were plentiful throughout the town. Digbeth was a significant site for spring water and had provided water for the area for drinking and washing purposes as well as contributing to the River Rea. However, Digbeth and Deritend became increasingly industrialised and the natural spring was built over as a result.

In William West's "Topography of Warwickshire" (1830), there were around ten private baths. Whilst the dimensions of the baths were small, they provided a range of services and had different aims. A major proprietor of bath houses in Birmingham was a Mr. Monro who had had premises in Lady Well and Snow Hill.

=== The campaign for public baths ===
Private baths were advertised as having healing qualities and being able to cure people of diabetes, gout and all skin diseases, amongst others. On 19 November 1844, it was decided that the working class members of society should have the opportunity to access baths, in an attempt to address the health problems of the public. On that day, a committee was formed and a fund was opened. Within a week, £4,000 had been donated to the fund.

On 22 April and 23 April 1845, two lectures were delivered in the town hall urging the provision of public baths in Birmingham and other towns and cities. It was recorded that the attendance of the lectures was low, however, those in attendance were 'highly respectable'.

A second public meeting was held by the committee on 15 June 1845, where they proposed to purchase a plot of land at the corner of Kent Street and Gooch Street in Birmingham. On 24 June 1845, the committee purchased the land for £6,102, which was taken from the funds they had accumulated.

=== Official establishment of the committee ===
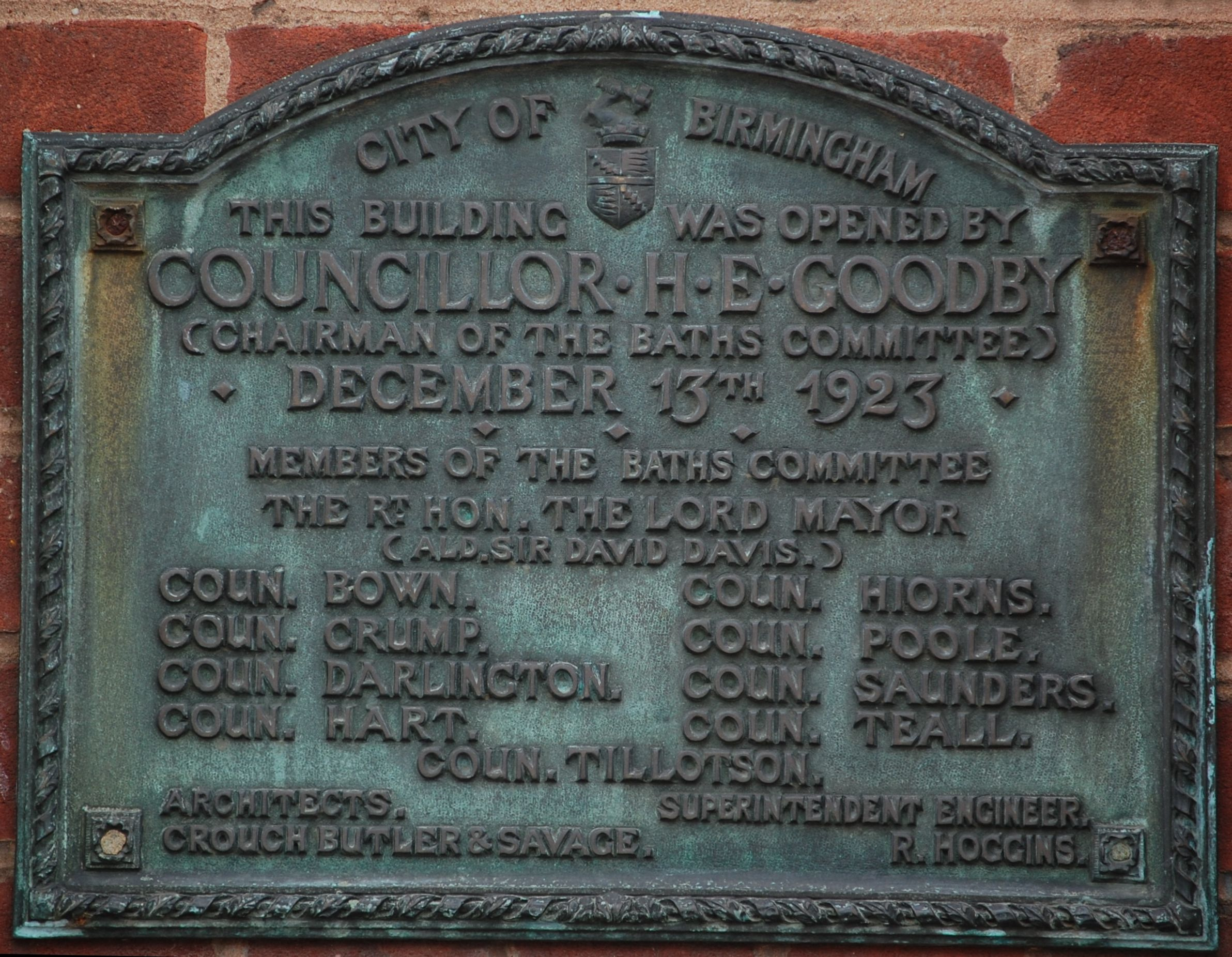
Plaque on Harborne Baths, showing membership of the committee as at December 1923.

After a period of campaigning by many committees, the Public Baths and Wash-houses Act received royal assent on 26 August 1846. The Act empowered local authorities to incur expenditure in constructing public swimming baths out of its own funds.

Following the Act of Parliament, the town council called a meeting on 7 October 1846. It was at this meeting that they decided to adopt the act, and at a meeting of the Public Baths Association in November 1846, they decided to give the land purchased by the committee to the council.

On 2 October 1848, the council gave their sanction for the construction of the first public baths and wash house on Kent Street site purchased by the Public Baths Association.

== Baths owned by the committee ==
The committee constructed many public baths and never acquired private baths. Also, Birmingham was undergoing a period of change in that it absorbed many urban districts which were not within the boundaries before. As a result of this, the committee often gained the ownership of bathing facilities owned by the district councils before.

=== Kent Street Baths ===
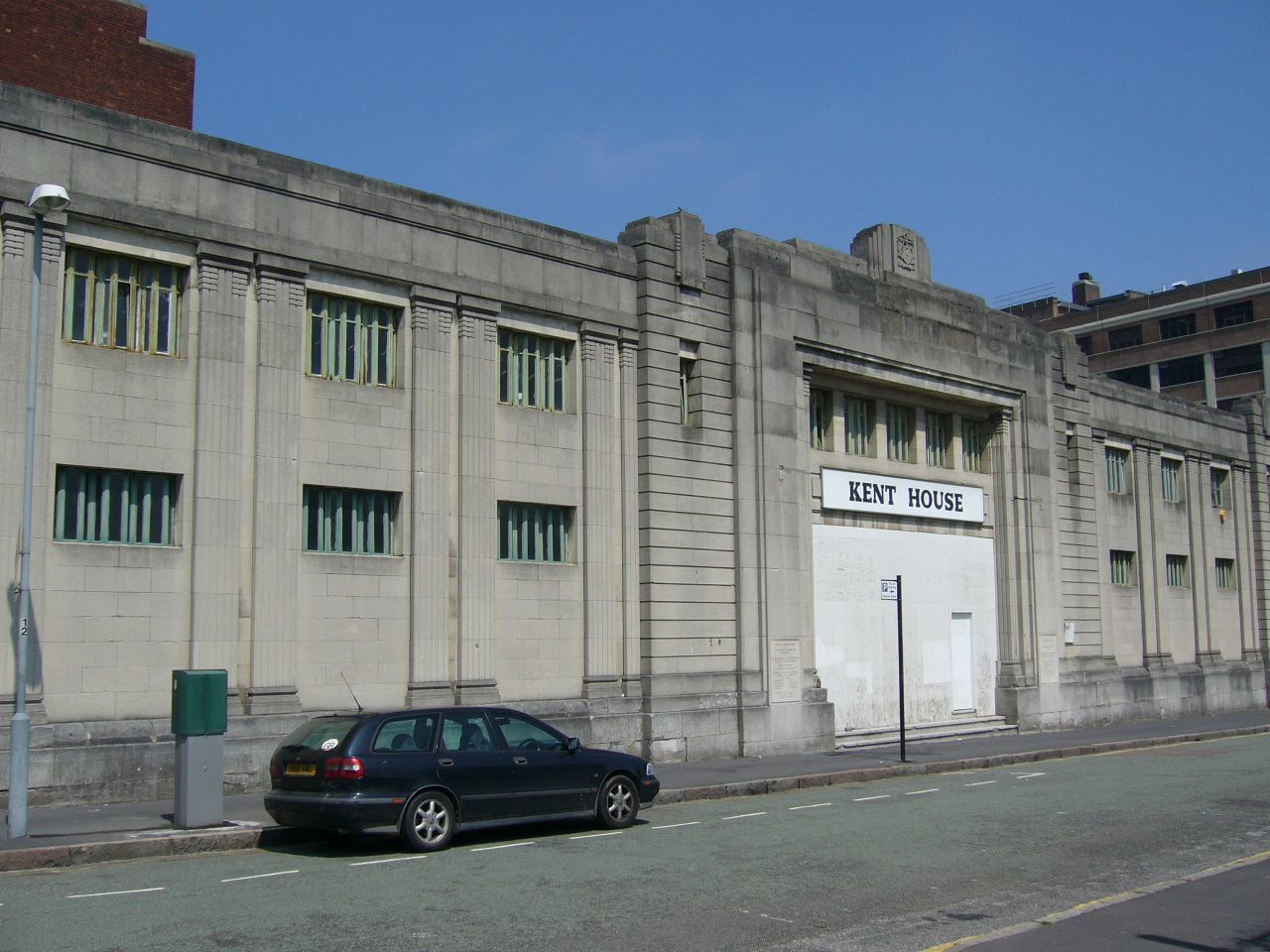
Kent Street Baths, while an empty building under the name of Kent House.

Kent Street Baths were the first baths opened by the committee. Construction began on 29 October 1849, with the laying of the first foundation stone. The baths were opened on 12 May 1851, however, the baths were not completed until 1852. The building was designed by D. R. Hill. The baths were close to the town centre and so received a good amount of water. However, this supply of water posed a problem to builders of the baths who found it difficult to prevent water from entering and flooding the construction site. The final cost of the baths was £23,000. The building contained "sixtynine private hot and cold water baths, two large swimming baths, three plunge baths and a public wash-house with laundry".

Victorian Turkish baths were later built on the site of the old wash-houses and opened to the public on 27 January 1879. They comprised fourteen dressing cubicles, a plunge pool, two hot rooms maintained at 145 °F and 195 °F, a shampooing room with a marble slab and a variety of showers, and a cooling-room with eight resting rooms.

On 30 March 1914, a women's swimming baths and baths for women were opened in an adjoining building to the main building on Gooch Street.

In 1930, the main buildings, with the exception of the women's bath on Gooch Street, were demolished and new facilities were built in a more modern style. The building contained a gala swimming bath, private baths, Russian and Victorian-style Turkish baths, offices and a repair and maintenance depot. It was opened on 29 May 1933. Designed by Hurley Robinson, it was of art deco architecture and remains today as Kent House.

Because it had been impossible to include Turkish baths in the new Monument Road baths (below) the baths section of the new Kent Street baths was enlarged by way of compensation. This now included a large cooling-room with twenty-two dressing cubicles, three hot rooms, two Russian steam cabinets, four shampooing rooms, needle showers, and a tiled plunge pool.

The bath suffered heavy damage during World War II with the loss of the gala bath to a heavy night raid on 3 December 1940. The surrounding buildings were also damaged from the blast. When the war finished, the committee repaired the baths.

In September 2009, after lying empty for years, the baths were demolished by Benacre Property, the landowner, provoking a local outcry. Despite being Grade B locally listed, Birmingham City Council were unable to save the building and the site has now become a surface car park.

=== Woodcock Street Baths ===
At a meeting of the council on 28 September 1852, the committee were advised to look for another site for a second suite of baths. The area selected for the suite of baths was Duddeston. The sites were narrowed down to Woodcock Street and construction began on 25 July 1859. Construction was completed considerably quicker than that of the Kent Street Baths and the baths were opened on 27 August 1860. The buildings were of a Gothic style as opposed to the Baroque style of the original Kent Street Baths.

Facilities provided included a large swimming pool, suites of private baths for men and woman, each with a small plunge pool. Additions were made which included a first class swimming pool, suites of first class private baths and a steam laundry to ease the demand at Kent Street.

After World War I, it was decided that the baths should be reconstructed. The buildings, with the exception of the 1902 bath, were demolished and the new buildings were opened on 14 April 1926. A gala bath, suites of private baths for men and women, a new laundry and offices were constructed.

The baths were improved again in 1948 with the installation of underwater lighting, improved lighting in the bath hall and the application of sprayed asbestos acoustic treatment to the bath hall ceiling.

=== Northwood Street Baths ===
In 1853, the inhabitants of the northern districts of Birmingham campaigned for the construction of a swimming bath in the area. A site between Northwood Street and Kenyon Street was chosen and construction began on 30 May 1861. On 5 March 1862, the baths had been completed and were opened to the public.

The architecture was of red brick with a blue brick base. The façade was decorated in block stone dressings and stone string courses with moulded cornice and cappings.

The baths closed in 1947 as a result of being destroyed beyond repair by air raids in World War II. The buildings were the oldest owned by the committee as the Kent Street and Woodcock Street baths had been reconstructed during their life times.

The baths offered first and second class swimming baths as well as large private baths. The private baths were transformed into a First Aid post upon the outbreak of the Second World War.

=== Monument Road Baths ===
Providing baths for the northwest of the town had been an issue since 1867, however, action did not begin until 1877 when a site at Monument Road was acquired by the committee. Construction of the building commenced early in 1881 and the baths opened on 27 February 1883.

The baths provided the area with first and second class baths, suites of first and second class men's and women's private baths, and Victorian Turkish baths. It fast became the second most popular bath owned by the committee, with attendances only being exceeded by the baths at Kent Street.

Just before the outbreak of the Second World War, it was decided to demolish the buildings and to construct a modern facility. However, as a result of planning restrictions, the site was resized and made smaller allowing the construction of only one swimming bath and no Turkish baths. The baths were opened on 27 June 1940 during World War II.

The baths were demolished at the end of the 1980s..

=== Green Lane Baths ===
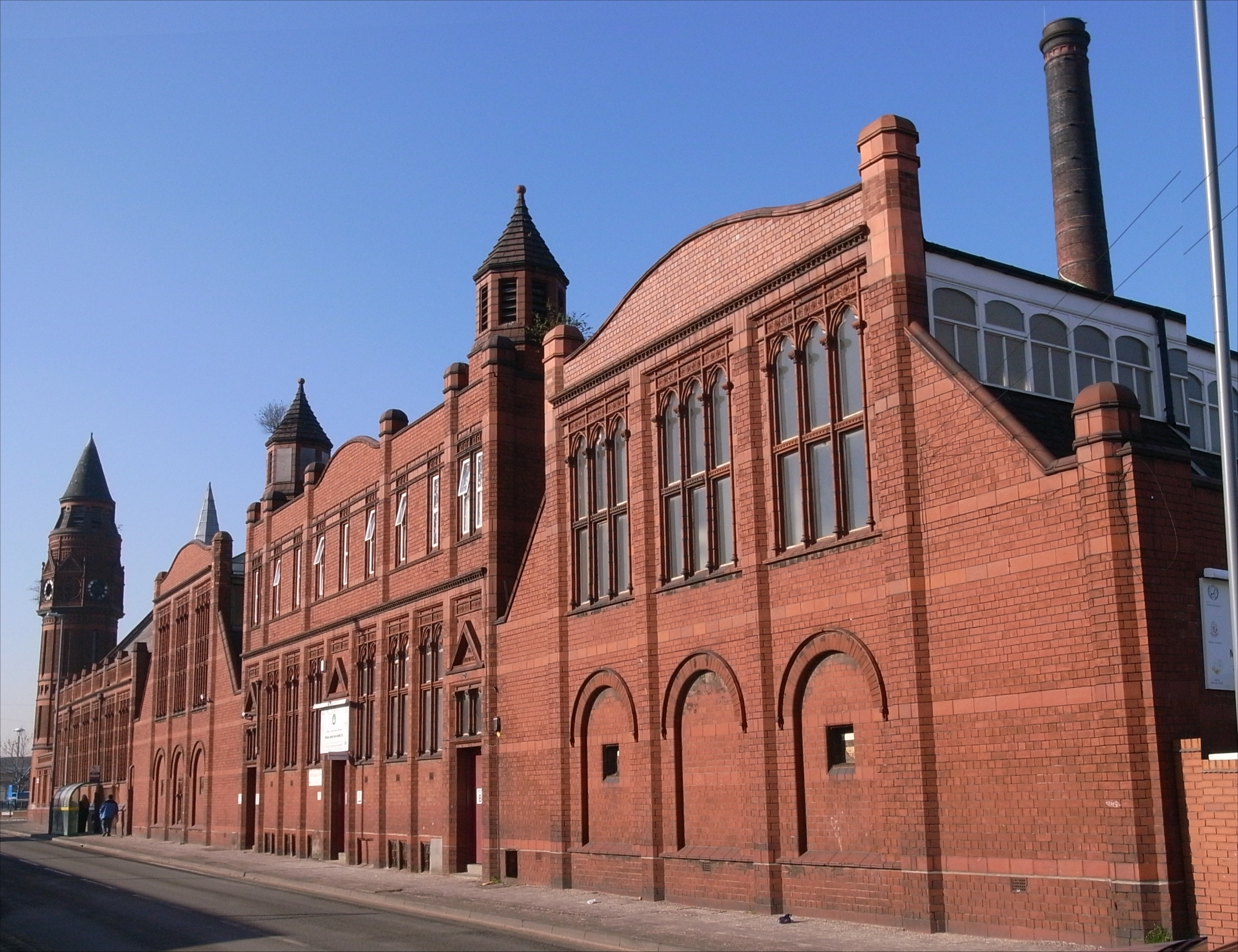
Green Lane Masjid (mosque), formerly Green Lane Public Library and Baths (Martin & Chamberlain 1893-1902

Talk of providing the areas of Bordesley and Deritend and the adjoining wards with baths had been around before that of the Monument Road Baths. The committee presented the council with a site they believed suitable for the construction of the baths, however, this was rejected on the grounds that a cheaper site be found.

By the end of 1887, no alternative site had become available and the original proposals were renewed. There were slight amendments made to the proposals, but again the proposals were rejected.

In 1890, the committee joined with the Free Libraries Committee who had also been looking for a site for a new library in Bordesley. A proposal was put forward by the two committees for the site at Green Lane, Small Heath for the erection of baths and a library. The council approved the proposal but financial problems meant that the baths did not open until 29 October 1902.

The baths provided first and second class swimming baths and first and second private baths for men and women. The baths suffered severe damage during an air raid in the night of 18 October 1940. After the end of the war, the council granted permission for the reconstruction and reparations of the baths and work commenced in 1951.

=== Moseley Road Baths ===
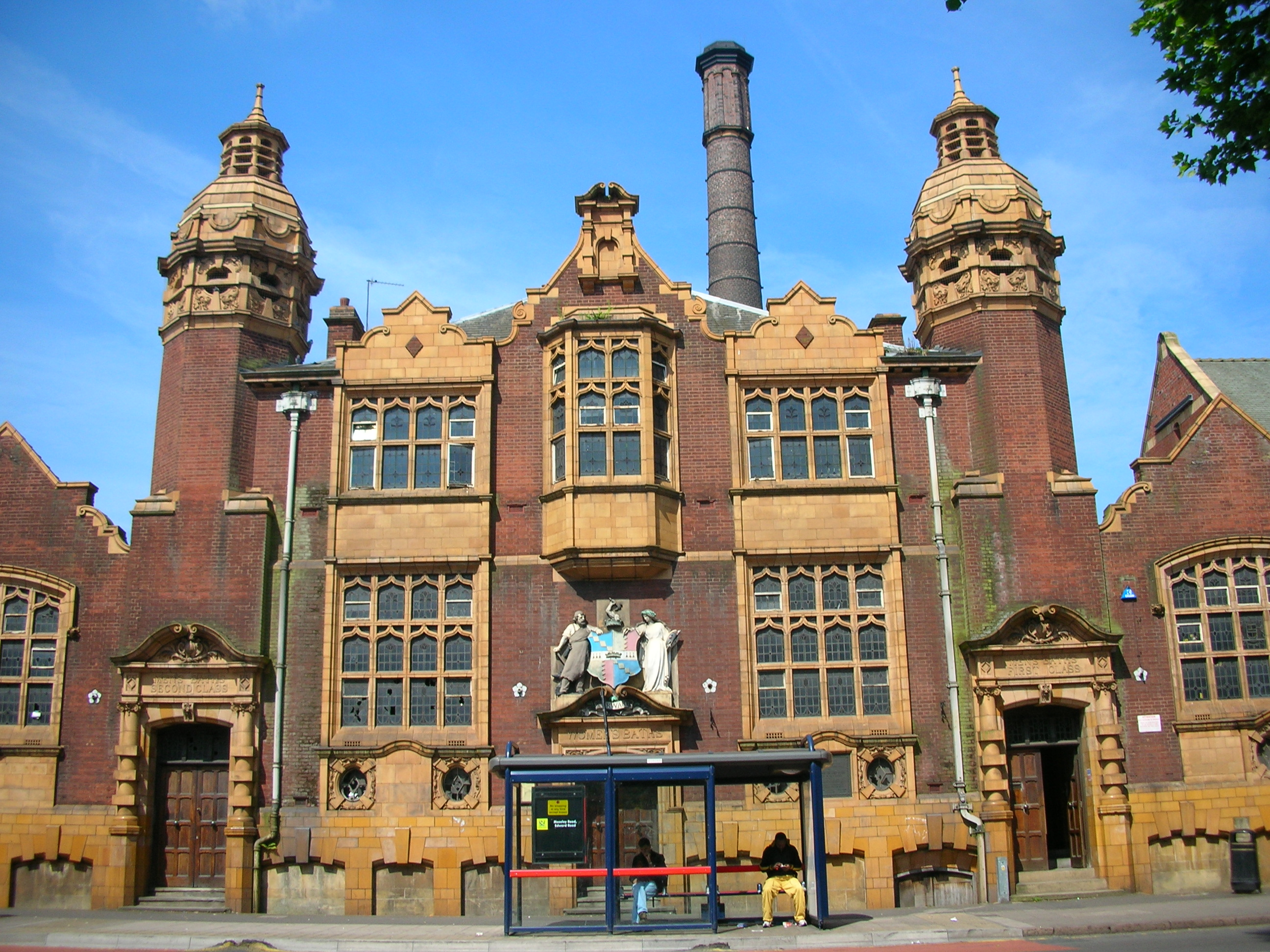
The baths in Balsall Heath

The approval for the construction of baths at Moseley Road came about through the discussions for the inclusion of Balsall Heath into Birmingham. The order for the inclusion of the area into Birmingham came into effect on 1 October 1891 and the committee were soon told to find a suitable location to construct baths.

Once again, the Baths Committee joined with the Free Libraries Committee to find a site and they soon found a site on the Moseley Road. Following some construction problems, the baths were opened on 30 October 1907 and offered a first class swimming bath with a gallery for spectators, a second class bath, suites of first and second class private baths for men and women, a clubroom and a small room for laundry facilities.

The building remains and is Grade II* Listed. It has undergone emergency repairs and a bid for Lottery Heritage Money is set to be submitted.

=== Nechells Baths ===
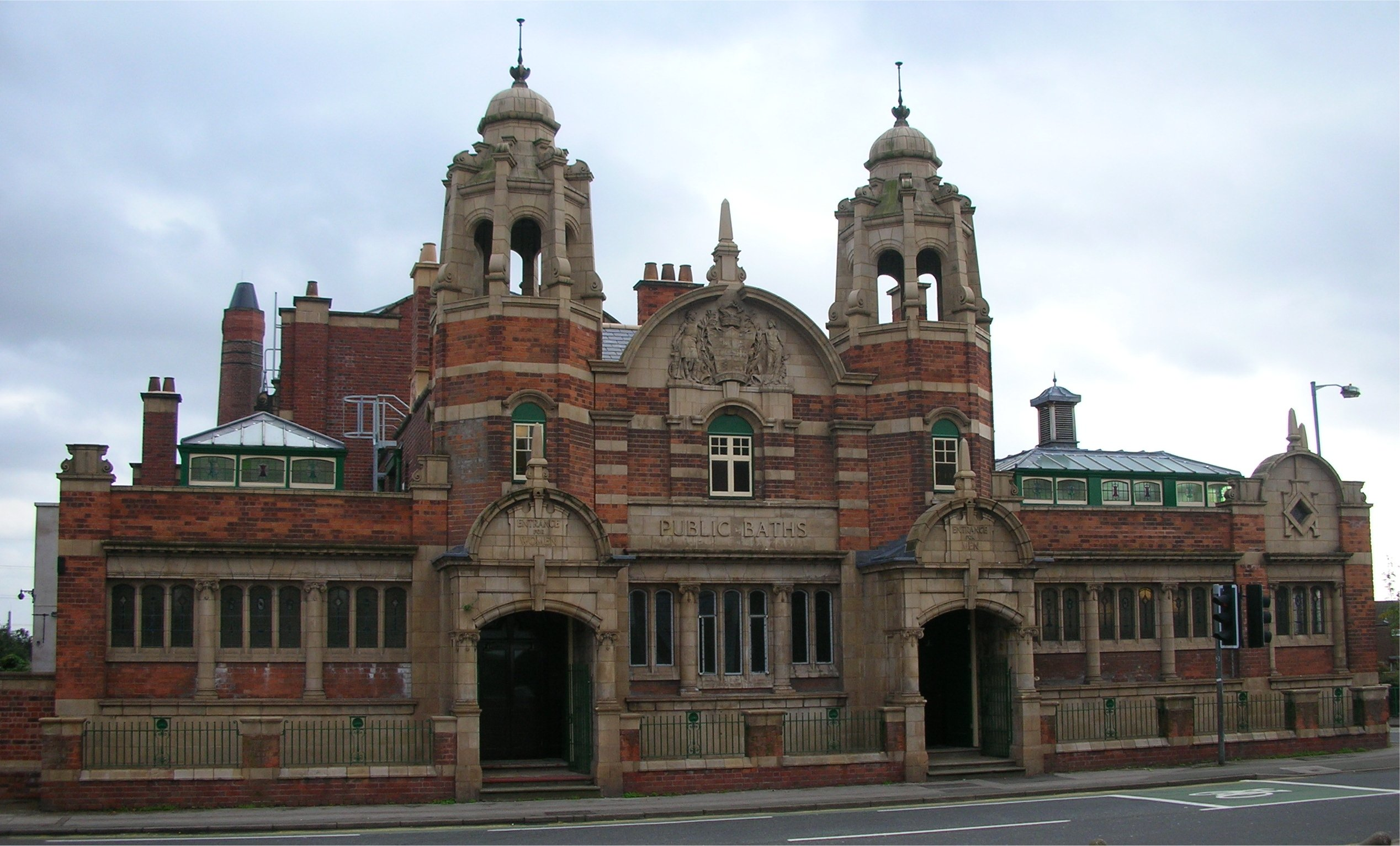
The grade II listed public baths on Nechells Park Road, Nechells.

In 1900, pressure was put on the committee for the construction of baths in the Nechells area of the city. However, due to other activities in which the committee were participating in, the plan for Nechells did not begin until 1903 when a site at the corner of Nechells Park and Aston Church Road was purchased. In 1908, approval was obtained for the construction of the building by the architect Arthur Harrison, and it opened on 22 June 1910.

It offered a large swimming bath with a gallery for spectators and suites of private baths for men and women.

Following interest from Pete Waterman, whose interest in using the baths as a recording studio fell through, the Birmingham Community Foundation Charity acquired and fully refurbished the baths, with the work being completed in May 2007 by the contractor Welconstruct. It cost £5.5 million, with funding from Advantage West Midlands, the Heritage Lottery Fund and ERDF.

=== Kings Heath Baths ===
Following the Greater Birmingham Scheme, the committee decided to immediately enquire into constructing baths in the area of Kings Heath. In 1911, a plot of land at Institute Road was purchased. The First World War interrupted plans for the development and it wasn't until 15 August 1923 that baths opened.

They were constructed as part of the Unemployed Relief Words with facilities provided including a swimming bath with suites of washing baths for men and women. It also had the ability of being floored over in the winter months for social purposes.

=== Harborne Baths ===
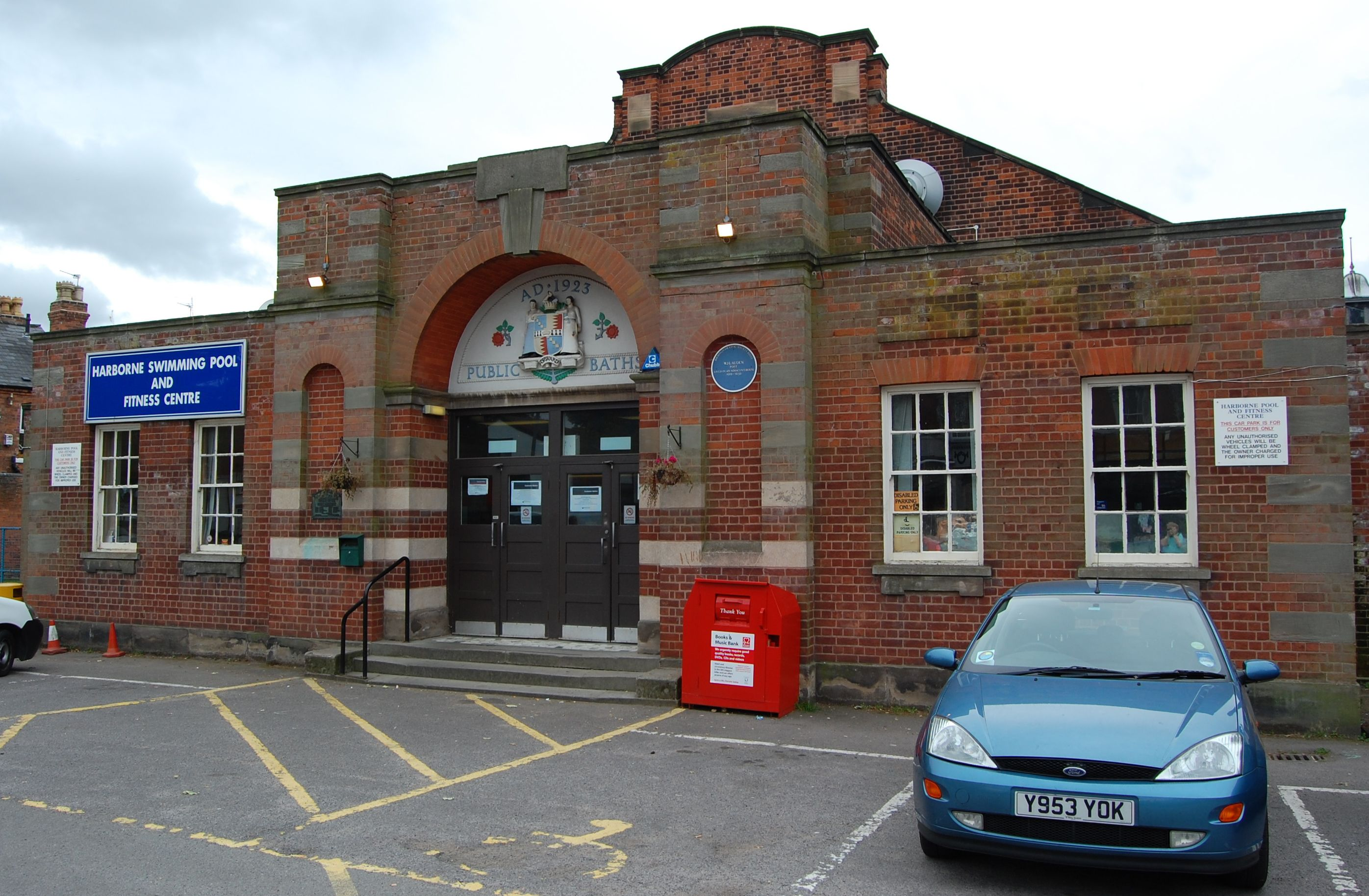
Harborne Baths.

Harborne acted after hearing about the residents of Kings Heath and in 1911, the committee also bought a plot of land in Lordswood Road. The baths were almost identical to that of the Kings Heath baths and offered exactly the same usages. Designed by architects Crouch, Butler and Savage, it opened on 13 December 1923.

The building now carries a blue plaque, noting that the poet W. H. Auden lived in an adjacent house from 1919–39.

The old building was demolished in 2010, with a modern replacement pool and leisure centre being built on the site.

=== Saltley Baths ===
The committee placed extra emphasis on the area of Saltley as it was densely populated. They purchased land in the area and the baths opened 30 July 1924. It was the first of the baths constructed by the committee to contain a 100-foot (30 m) pool. This allowed it to become a venue for competitive swimming. It also had the ability to be floored over in the winter months and be used as a hall. During World War II, it became popular as a public dancing venue.

=== Erdington Baths ===
Mason Road in Erdington was the next site chosen for the erection of baths by the committee. On the site, an establishment offering a swimming bath, suites of washing baths for men and women and Victorian-style Turkish baths was constructed and opened on 6 May 1925.

The pool had the ability to be floored over in the winter months, however, winter swimming was popular at the facility and the floor was not added.

The Turkish baths were closed in 2017.

=== Sparkhill Baths ===
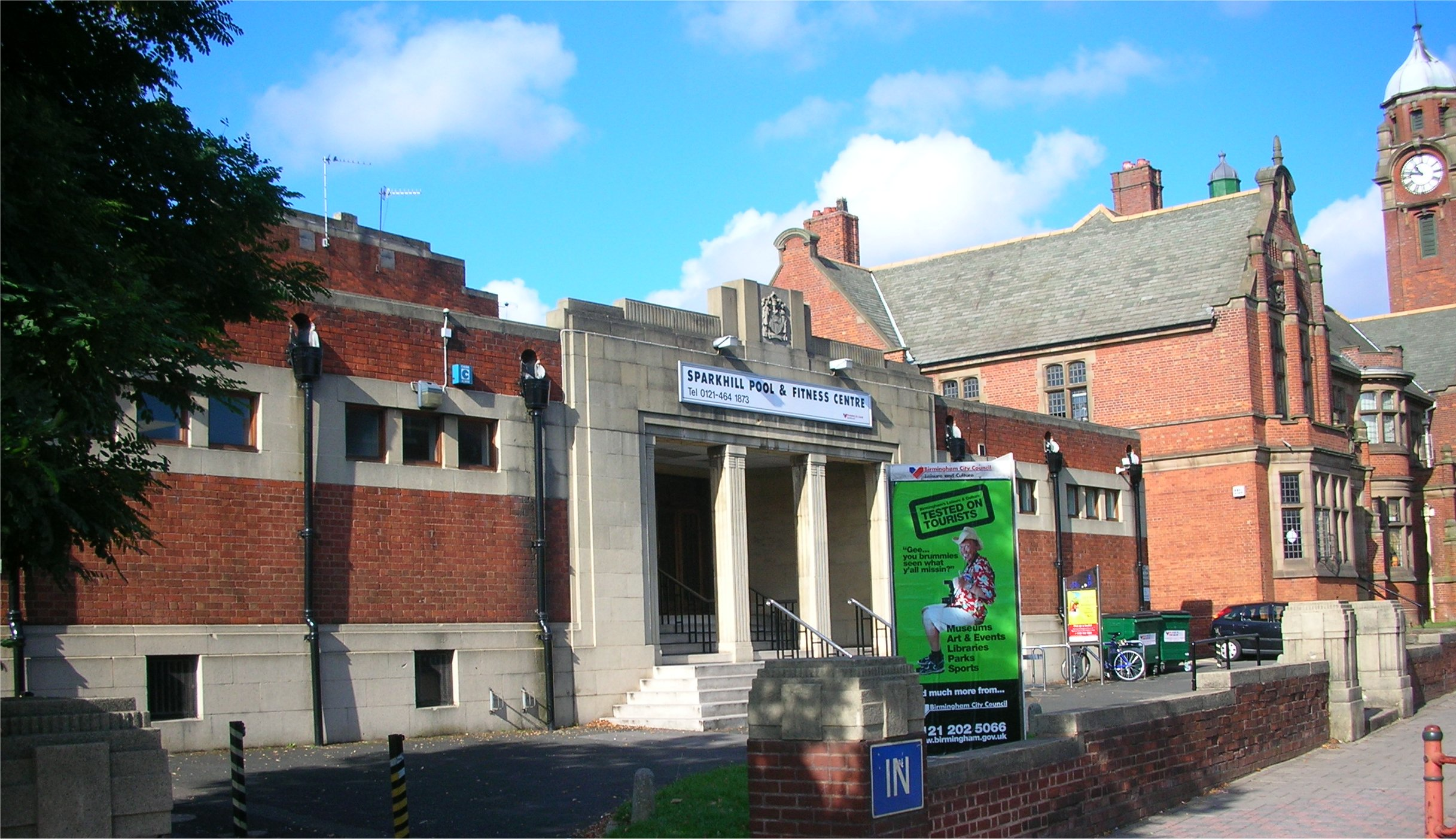
Sparkhill baths

In 1923, a scheme to construct an Unemployed Relief Works containing baths in the area of Sparkhill was approved by the council, however, there was a lack of skilled labour due to the demand in house construction. The district pressed for a reconsideration in February 1927 and the committee decided to place focus upon the baths that were to be built on the site.

They purchased land on the busy Stratford Road with the intention of building the most modern set of baths possible. Members of the committee were sent to towns to observe the latest types of baths built and were also sent to Germany to obtain information.

The baths, designed by architect Hurley Robinson, opened on 29 July 1931. The main swimming pool was 100 feet (30 m) by 35 feet (11 m) with a depth of 9 feet (2.7 m). The baths also featured a learner's pool specially suited for children near the entrance hall. There were 160 dressing boxes, which were not fronting onto the pool but in corridors. As well as the swimming facilities, there is a cafe. Soon after World War II, the pool was modernised with new lighting and acoustic treatment.

As of September 2009, the baths are closed, with a decision to be made as to their future.

=== Northfield Baths ===
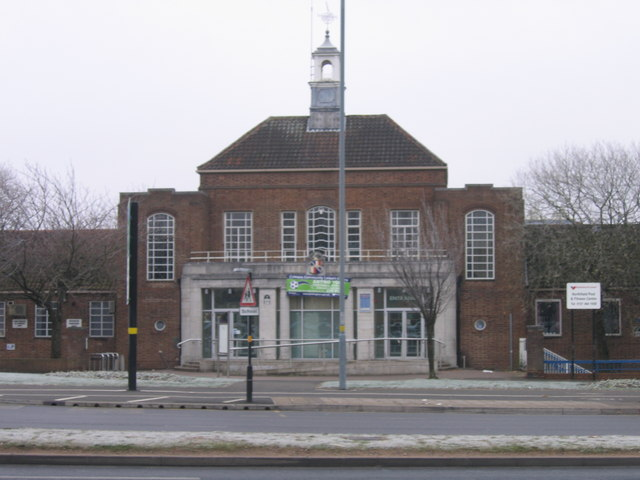
Northfield baths

Northfield was a quickly developing area and the committee focussed on providing baths for it. It was decided to build the baths at Bristol Road South. As the area was predominantly new build, most houses contained their own washing facilities, thus removing the necessity for washing facilities at the baths.

The Northfield Baths was designed by the architect Henry Walter Simister opened 8 May 1937 and consisted of a 100-foot-long (30 m) swimming pool and a learners' pool. It was a large site providing a lot of space for car parking. There was also a large cafe overlooking the main pool.

In the early 1980s the large former gents changing rooms was converted to separate gents and ladies changing areas, with the former ladies changing area becoming an additional fitness suite. The changing facilities were again remodelled in 2003, along with the reception area, while the pool was closed to have a large refurbishment.

The baths were closed in 2016 and the handsome Art Deco building demolished in 2017 and replaced by a new swimming and gym facility which opened in 2018.

=== Kingstanding Baths ===
Kingstanding was another newly developing area and the same approach was given like the Northfield Baths. Located on Warren Farm Road, the baths opened on 31 March 1938 and were the last to be constructed before the outbreak of World War II. The baths again offered a 100-foot-long (30 m) pool and a learners' pool.

== Baths acquired by the committee ==
The Greater Birmingham Scheme received royal assent on 3 June 1911 and this resulted in the areas of Handsworth, Aston, Erdington, Yardley, Moseley, Kings Heath and Northfield being included in the Birmingham boundaries, thus expanding the city.

Due to the acquisition of the areas, the baths committee also acquired four new baths;

- Victoria Road Baths, Aston
- Tiverton Road Baths, Bournbrook
- Grove Lane Baths, Handsworth
- Bournville Lane Baths, Stirchley.

The Grove Lane facility, opened by the Handsworth Local Bard on 28 January 1907, was unusual in that it had two 100-foot-long (30 m) swimming baths, which was large for those days. It also allowed the swimming pool to have a floor fitted over it in the winter months for social purposes, such as dancing. Also included was a Victorian-style Turkish bath situated partly in the basement. It comprised three hot rooms, shampooing rooms (with needle bath and plunge) and a cooling-room, "the whole being fitted and designed in a simple and appropriate Eastern style." The baths closed in 1982 and, after standing derelict for many years, they were converted into a number of residential apartments. A new leisure centre, with swimming pool, had meanwhile opened in the adjacent Handsworth Park.

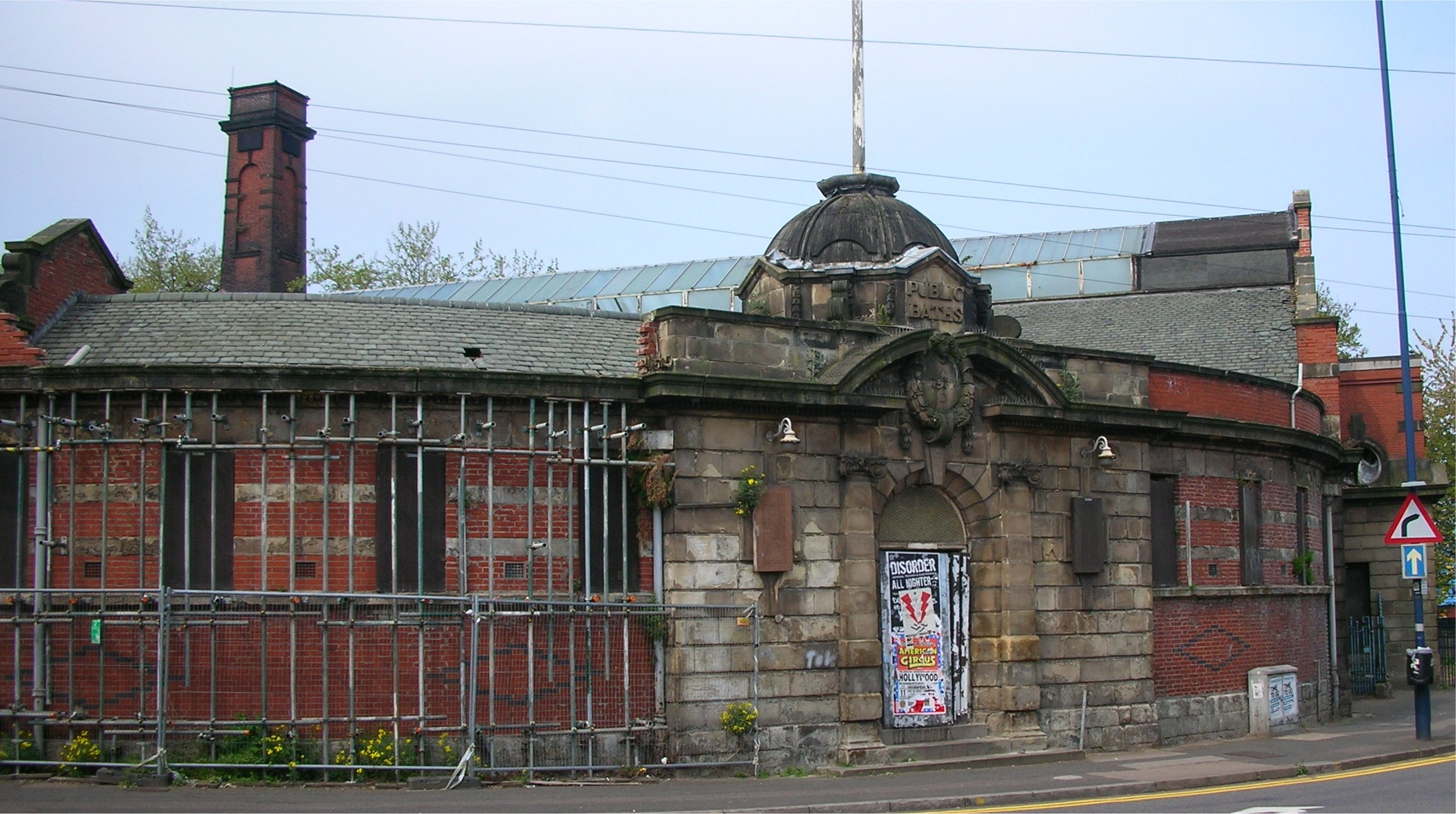
Bournville Lane baths, Stirchley

Bournville Lane Baths were unusual in that they featured an aeration and filtration system for the water which was extracted from a mains supply. This meant that the baths did not need to be emptied and refilled. This system was modern and the system was later installed in all swimming baths controlled by local authorities meaning that King's Norton and Northfield District Council were the first local authority in the country to use such a system. The Baths were built in 1910 to a design by John P. Osborne. The building is Grade II listed.

== Post war committee ==
After World War II, the committee were faced with the task of modernising and reconstructing many of the baths. Kent Street Baths, which had been the most popular bathing facility in the city, had been seriously damaged by a night raid and action by the committee was immediately taken to repair it. Several other baths had suffer light damage from bombing raids and needed repair work.

Numerous baths were modernised with the installation of new lighting which was added to the roof and inside the pool itself. Acoustic treatment was added and in some cases, asbestos was sprayed in the buildings.

The department continued to open baths including Stechford baths on 20 June 1962 by Councillor H. Bentley.

In 1974, the baths committee merged with other departments in the council to form the Leisure Department. From 5 April 2004, management of leisure facilities was devolved to individual constituencies (originally 11, now 10).

== Cottage baths ==
Cottage baths were small baths off streets which were sometimes built in converted buildings. Experiments of this in Manchester, Liverpool and Bradford were unsuccessful, and results from the experiment in Brighton were varied. In 1905, a member of the Health Committee published a report which strongly recommended the construction of cottage baths. This prompted the council to look into providing cottage baths.

The first attempt by the committee was made in 1902 with the proposed conversion of the George Arthur Road police station into cottage baths. This was rejected and it was decided to build an entirely new building on Adderley Road. These proposals were unanimously approved. More baths were then constructed on Coventry Street in Digbeth, Brearley Street in Summer Lane, Bacchus Road in Winson Green, Lower Dartmouth Street in Bordesley, Grosvenor Road in Aston, Willis Street in Ashted and St Georges Street in Hockley.

By 1950, however, only three baths remained in use due to decreasing attendances. All cottage baths were closed by 1960.

== Open air pools ==
Open air pools were popular amongst the residents of Birmingham during the summer months as a place to cool down in the warm weather. The first municipal open air pool was opened in Cannon Hill Park, and they opened on 1 September 1873 on the same day the park opened. However, the pool was used by the boating club. The lease was not renewed in 1899 and it was decided that the committee should take control of the pool.

The second pool was opened on 9 July 1883 in Victoria Park in Small Heath. It was larger than the Cannon Hill Park pool and consisted of a very similar shape.

Brookvale Park Lake in Erdington became the third location for a pool. It was opened in a disused drinking-water reservoir and was opened on 7 October 1909. It was open until 1926.

Open air pools were both a commercial problem as they only received money in warm weather, and they were also a risk to the health of the users. A report published by the Ministry of Health advised against the use of open air pools unless they were chlorinated and filtrated. The committee felt that cost of adding such systems to the pools in Victoria Park and Cannon Hill Park was too expensive and both pools were closed in early 1939.
