= Regal Cinema, Evesham =

Cinema in Evesham, Wychavon, Worcestershire, England

Regal Cinema
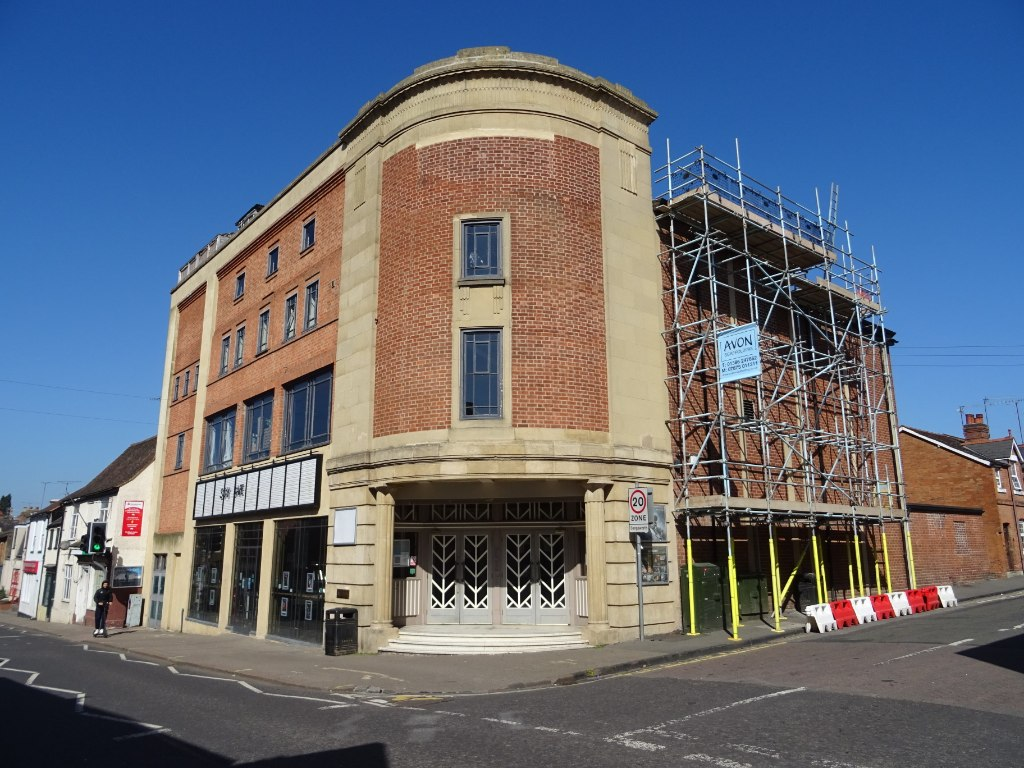

General information
- Architectural style: Art Deco
- Location: Evesham, Worcestershire
- Address: 41 Port Street; Evesham WR11 6AD
- Country: England
- Coordinates: 52°5′27.294″N 1°56′23.932″W grid reference SP 04209 43620
- Opened: 1932

Design and construction
- Architect(s): Hurley Robinson

Website
- theregal.ac/web

The Regal Cinema is a cinema in Evesham, Worcestershire, England. Built in 1932, it is a Grade II listed building. After closure in 2003, the venue re-opened in 2012 after renovation. It is noted for its Art Deco style.

== History and description ==
The cinema was built by a group of local businessmen, who commissioned the architect Hurley Robinson. It seated 945, in stalls and circle levels, and it opened on 10 October 1932, showing the film The Silent Voice.

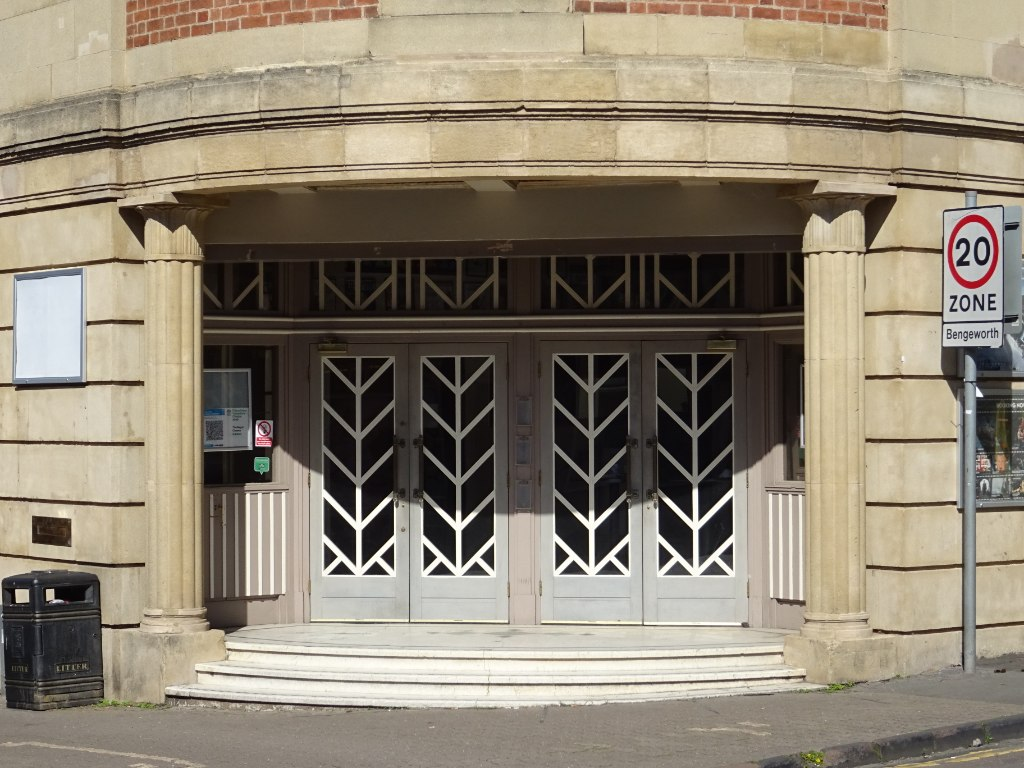
The Art Deco doors at the corner entrance

The listing text comments that "Robinson had designed over 55 cinemas before the Regal, but this is a rare survival and the most architecturally significant." It is a steel-framed building clad in brick, and the street frontage is framed in stonework. The corner entrance is flanked by reeded columns with lotus leaf capitals. There are paired double doors with an arrow motif, repeated in the glazing above.

In 2000, after the Regal was put up for sale, the Evesham Regal Trust was founded, a charity dedicated to preserving the cinema. The building was given listed status, Grade II, by Historic England on 13 November 2000. The cinema closed in 2003 and remained unused for a number of years. Plans were proposed in 2009 to renovate the building, and after restoration and refurbishment costing £2m, it re-opened on 21 January 2012, with new seating arrangements including tables at the former stalls, and luxury seats and sofas in the circle.

The Regal screens films and also stages live events; it holds exhibitions, and there is a coffee shop and wine bar.
