= Hurley Robinson =

English architect (1883–1953)

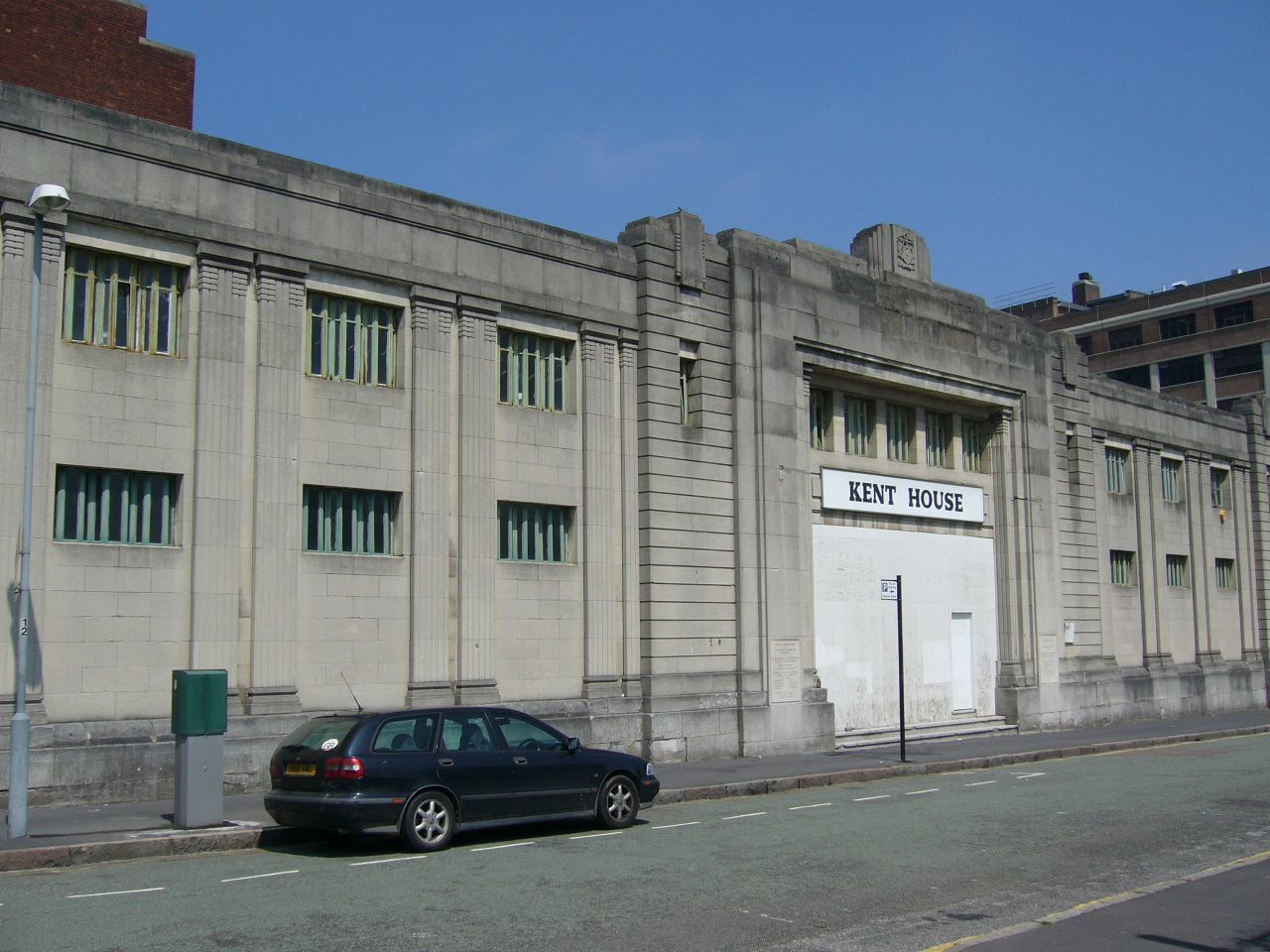
Kent Street Baths (1931-33), while an empty building under the name of Kent House

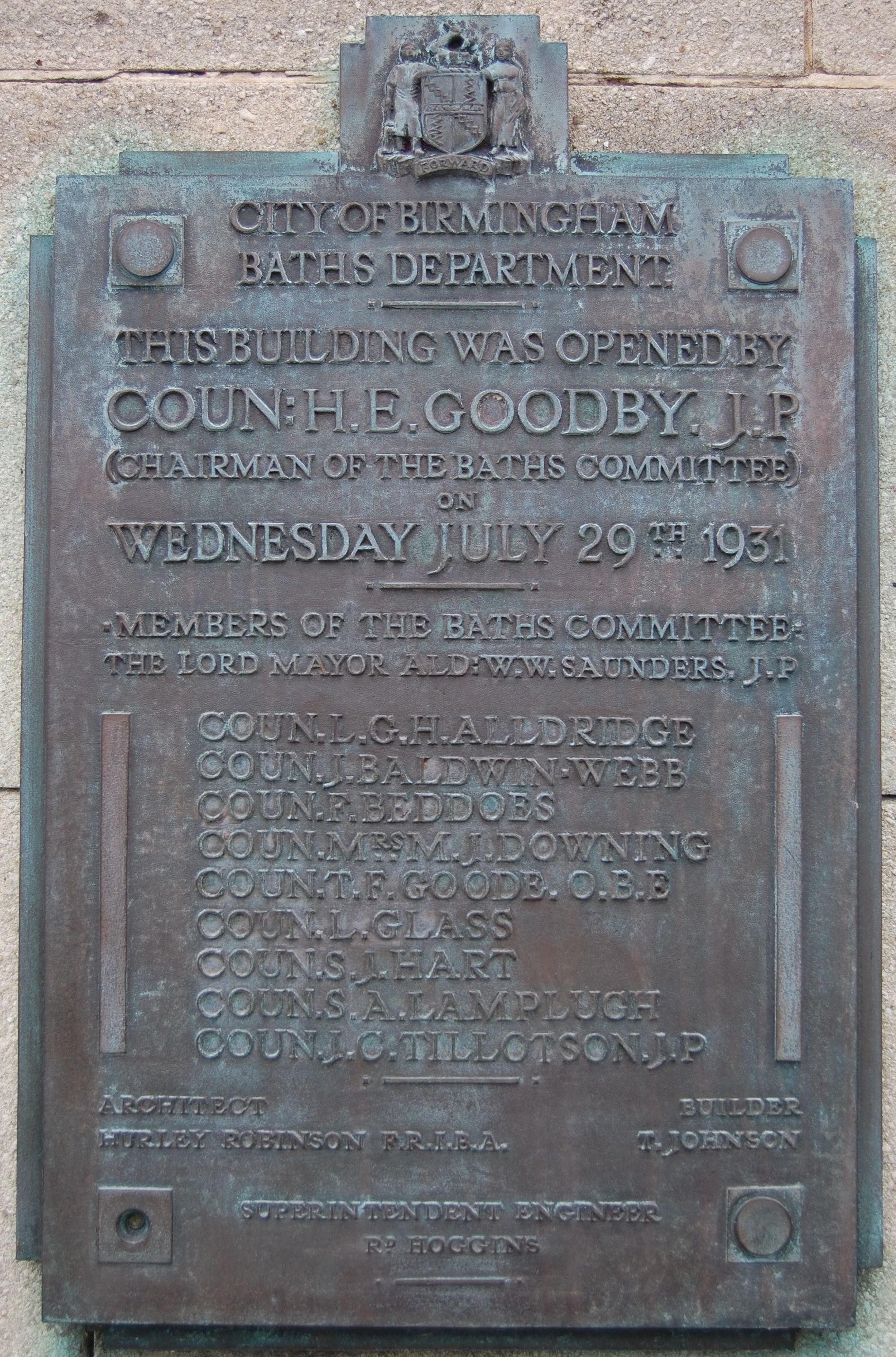
Plaque commemorating the July 1931 opening of Sparkhill Baths, Birmingham, crediting Hurley Robinson as architect.

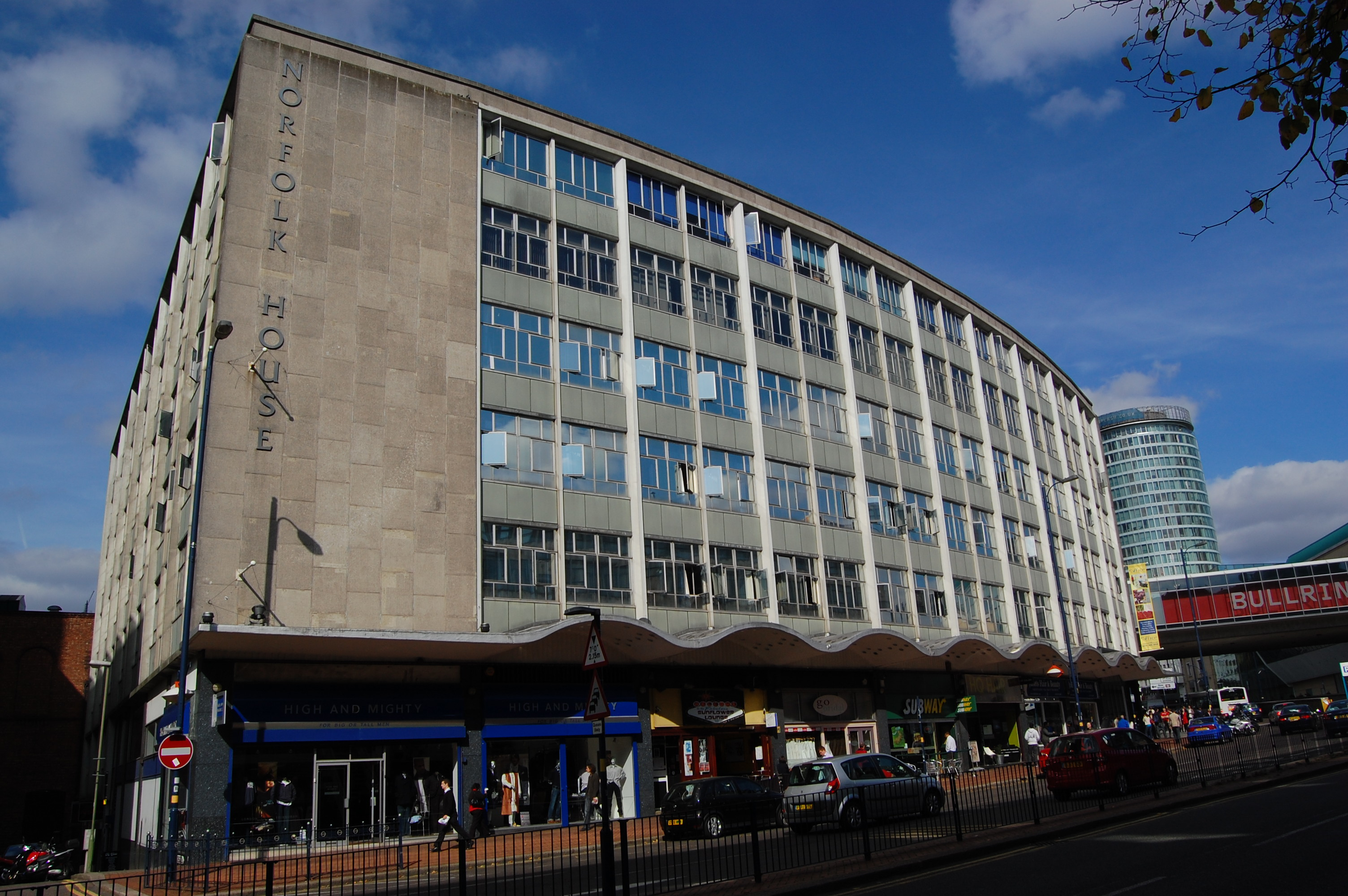
Norfolk House

Archibald Hurley Robinson FRIBA (14 June 1883 – 24 February 1953) was a prolific English architect of cinemas prior to the Second World War.

== Biography ==
Robinson was born in Handsworth, Staffordshire. After serving in the Royal Air Force in the First World War, he set up his own practice which was initially called Hurley Robinson & Sons and then renamed Hurley Robinson & Partners, which were both based in Birmingham, England.

His work on cinemas was mainly during the 1930s. His cinemas were mainly of the Art Deco style that was popularly used by Oscar Deutsch for his Odeon Cinemas. A lot of Robinson's work was commissioned in the Midlands area of England.

Hurley Robinson remodelled the Salters' Hall in Droitwich Spa, Worcestershire to become a cinema in 1933. This was again altered to become a library in 1982. He also designed the Ritz Cinema in Bordesley Green, Birmingham. A pre-World War II work by Robinson was the Lee Longlands furniture store on Broad Street, Birmingham. This was completed in 1931, and is a rare example of a building that was not a cinema by Robinson before the war. The building was extended in 1939. Another example of a pre-World War II work by Hurley Robinson is the Kent Street Baths in Birmingham which was built between 1931 and 1933. The Art Deco baths survived, unused, until September 2009. His Sparkhill Baths, from the same era, still stand. Hurley Robinson also designed the Dudley Hippodrome theatre, which was built in 1938.

Following World War II, the cinema business deteriorated and Robinson's work was less concentrated on this aspect of construction. In 1959, Robinson was commissioned to design an extension to a factory used by Rootes Motor Parts Limited on the Coventry Road in Birmingham. Also in 1959, construction of Norfolk House on Smallbrook Queensway, Birmingham was completed. The bow-fronted building was originally intended to be a warehouse, however it later incorporated offices and retail units and is now locally listed. The façade is clad in stone and there is a wavy shell concrete canopy above the street level.

== Cinemas ==
Cinemas designed by Robinson include:

Name	Location	Constructed/ Opened	Closed	Seats	Screens	Additional notes or references	Coordinates
Cannon Bristol Road (also known as ABC Bristol Road)	Edgbaston, Birmingham	16 May 1937	16 May 1987	1,712	3		52.46691°N 1.90204°W
Odeon Cinema (Also known as New Empire Cinema)	Loughborough, Leicestershire	14 September 1914		1,328	6		
Odeon Bilston (also known as New Wood's Picture Palace)	Bilston, West Midlands	17 November 1921	22 February 1964	1,400	1		52.5667°N 2.0744°W
Plaza Cinema	Dudley, West Midlands	28 May 1936	27 October 1990	1,600	2		
Regal Cinema	Evesham, Worcestershire	10 October 1932		945	1		
Winson Green Picture House (also known as Winson Green Palace)	Winson Green, Birmingham	1914	21 March 1959	1,299	1		
The Rex Cinema	Coalville, Leicestershire	1938	3 May 1984	Approx. 1,250	2		
The Regal Cinema	Coalville, Leicestershire	2 Nov 1933	14 May 1960	1,200	1		
