= Odeon Cinema, Bilston =

Former cinema in Bilston, England

Odeon Cinema Wood's Picture Palace
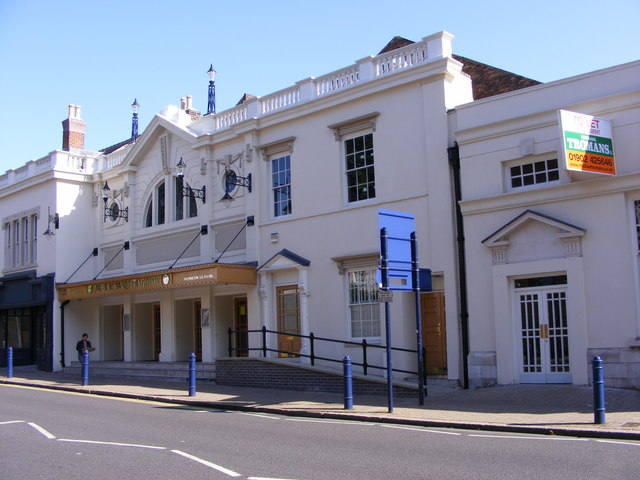
- The building in 2009
- Interactive map of the Odeon Cinema; Wood's Picture Palace area

General information
- Location: Bilston, West Midlands grid reference SO 951 965, 41 Lichfield Street, United Kingdom
- Coordinates: 52.5667°N 2.0744°W
- Opened: 1921

Design and construction
- Architect: Hurley Robinson

The Odeon Cinema (originally Wood's Picture Palace) is a former cinema in Bilston, West Midlands England. Built in 1921, it was a cinema until 1964.

== History ==
The Wood family, who had shown films in Bilston Town Hall since 1910, built the cinema, named Wood's Picture Palace, in 1921. The architect was Hurley Robinson. It seated 1,400 in stalls and circle levels; it had stage facilities, a café and a billiard room. The first film shown, on 17 November 1921, was The Old Nest. The first "talkie" shown was On Trial, on 14 October 1929.

It became one of the Odeon Cinemas chain in 1936, and was renamed the Odeon in 1937. The cinema was closed in February 1964 by its then owners The Rank Organisation. The interior was converted into a bingo hall, and it opened as Top Rank Bingo Club the following year; after subsequent changes of name, bingo was discontinued in 1999.

In 2005 the building became an events venue, the Imperial Banqueting Suite.
