= Dudley Hippodrome =

Former theatre in Dudley, England, later used as a bingo hall

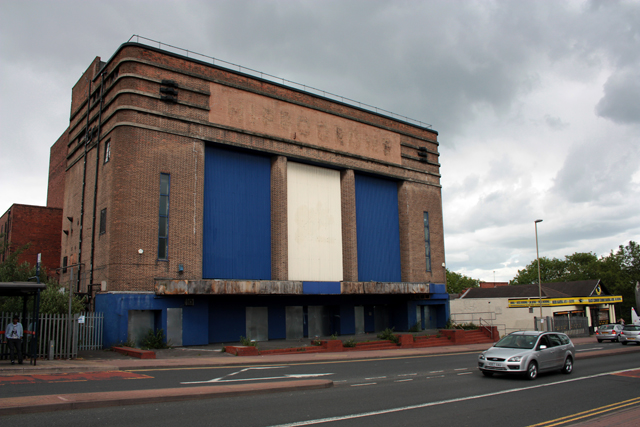
- Vacant building of the Dudley Hippodrome
- Interactive map of Dudley Hippodrome
- Address: Castle Hill; Dudley; England
- Coordinates: 52.5135°N 2.0765°W
- Owner: Dudley Metropolitan Borough Council
- Capacity: 1,750 (original); 1,507 (1967)
- Current use: Demolished

Construction
- Opened: 19 December 1938
- Closed: 1964
- Demolished: 2023
- Years active: 1938–1964
- Architect: A. Hurley Robinson

Website
- www.dudley-hippodrome.co.uk

The Dudley Hippodrome was a theatre in the town of Dudley, West Midlands, England. The Hippodrome was built in 1938 on the site of the Dudley Opera House, which was destroyed by fire in 1936, and remained open as a variety theatre until 1964. It subsequently operated as a bingo hall by Gala Bingo before closing in 2009.

Since 2009 it has been owned by Dudley Council, with plans to demolish the site to make way for redevelopment, though local campaigners who protested these proposals, favouring a return to theatre use, finally lost their battle in December 2021. The building was demolished in 2023. The site is to be used for a health and life sciences college of Worcester University, scheduled to open in 2026.

== History ==
The Dudley Hippodrome theatre was constructed on the site of the Dudley Opera House, which had been opened in 1899 but had been gutted by a fire that started in the early hours of 1 November 1936. Once it became evident that the Opera House was beyond repair, a decision was taken by its proprietor, Benjamin Kennedy, to demolish the building and build an entirely new theatre.

The architect chosen for the new building was Archibald Hurley Robinson and the local contractor, A.J. Crump started the building work on 23 August 1937. The theatre opened on 19 December 1938. The brick-built construction with stalls and circle had seating for 1,750. The opening ceremony was performed by local MP, Dudley Joel and the first headline act was Jack Hylton and his band. Dudley-born Wimbledon champion Dorothy Round was also in attendance.

The owner, Benjamin Kennedy died on 10 April 1939, passing on responsibility for running the theatre to his sons, Maurice and Robert although ownership was retained by the trustees of the former proprietor.

The comedy duo, Laurel and Hardy appeared at the theatre in May 1947.

Tommy Cooper and Eve Boswell performed the production King of Hearts at the theatre in 1954.

In 1958, singer Paul Anka performed a sold-out concert at the Hippodrome.

The theatre suffered financial problems in 1958, when it was closed for several months, eventually re-opening under new ownership in December of that year.

Cliff Richard performed to a sold-out crowd in 1959.

The final stage show at the theatre occurred on 24 February 1964. Later in the same year the theatre came under the control of the Midland Entertainment Agency. The owner, V. Kendrick announced his intention to operate it as a casino and bingo hall with some live shows.

In 1968, the Hippodrome was acquired by Mr H. Whitehouse of Newtown Entertainments Ltd. He announced that bingo would continue at the venue but that wrestling would no longer take place.

The building was acquired by Ladbrokes which introduced a nightclub with live acts under the brand "Cesar's Palace", which opened on 15 November 1973.

Roy Orbison became the last star to perform at the Hipppodrome on 16 August 1974.

The theatre's final years were as a Bingo Hall, which closed on 19 September 2009. The building was purchased by Dudley Council, which planned to demolish the site to make way for redevelopment. Planning requirements were met, and demolition began in August 2023; it was expected to take about four months.
