= Dudley Opera House =

Opera house in England destroyed by fire in 1936

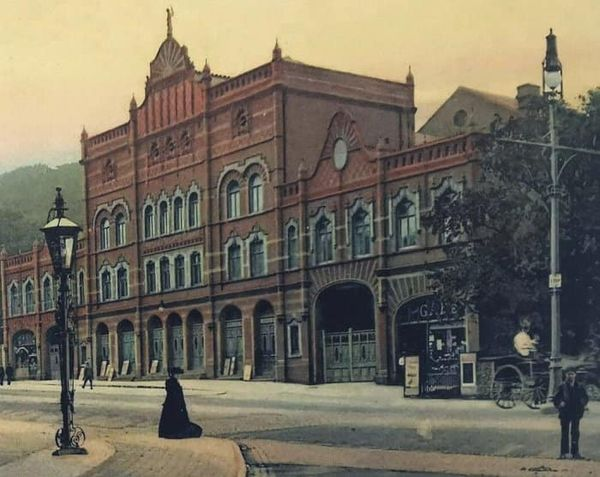
- Interactive map of the Dudley Opera House area

General information
- Location: Castle Hill, Dudley, West Midlands, England
- Opened: 4 September 1899
- Demolished: 1 November 1936
- Cost: £16,000

Design and construction
- Architect: A. Ramsell

Other information
- Seating capacity: 2000

Dudley Opera House was an opera house in Dudley, West Midlands, England that opened in 1899 before being destroyed by fire in 1936.

== History ==
Dudley Opera House was built on land purchased from the 2nd Earl of Dudley by John Maurice Clement and was designed by A. Ramsell. The building was built by local building company J. H. Whittaker & Company, took two years to build at a cost of £16,000 and had a capacity for 2000 people. The building was built in Italian Renaissance red brick architecture with terracotta dressings. The foundation stone was laid on 27 June 1898 by the Mayor of Dudley. The opera house opened on 4 September 1899 with a performance of Mikado by the D’Oyly Carte Repertory Company. The Era newspaper reported on the new opera house on 9 September 1899 stating “This elegant addition to our provincial theatres opened its doors on Monday, under the patronage of the Earl and Countess of Dudley, the mayor, and members of the Town Council, when a large and fashionable audience tested its holding capacity”.

It was named the Dudley Opera House and Hippodrome as it began showing operas, plays, dramas and music hall acts on its 72ft wide stage. The venue became very popular and by the early 1900’s films were part of the variety programme. Charlie Chaplin performed at the opera house in 1906 as did a young Stan Laurel in 1908. In the summer of 1910, the opera house was renamed the Opera House Picture Palace and Electric Theatre due to showing afternoon films. In 1920, the opera house was purchased by Benjamin Kennedy and his son Robert. As there was now little interest in opera, the theatre began to rely on popular variety acts. The theatre was equipped to screen sound films in 1930.

== Fire and demolition ==
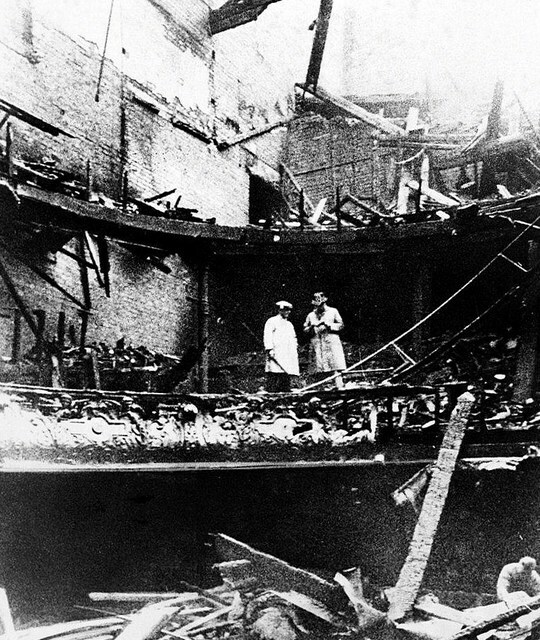
Interior ruins of the opera house after the fire.

At 2.00am on 1 November 1936, Robert Kennedy did a last tour of the building before locking up for the night after the theatre’s final performance. Fire soon broke out inside the building causing extensive damage to the interior and structure. The cost of the damage caused by the fire was around £40,000 to £50,000. Due to the damage and the building structure no longer declared safe, the opera house was demolished for public safety. Ten months later work began on constructing a new replacement theatre, Dudley Hippodrome.
