= Sutton Walmley and Minworth =

Electoral ward in Birmingham, England

- Ward
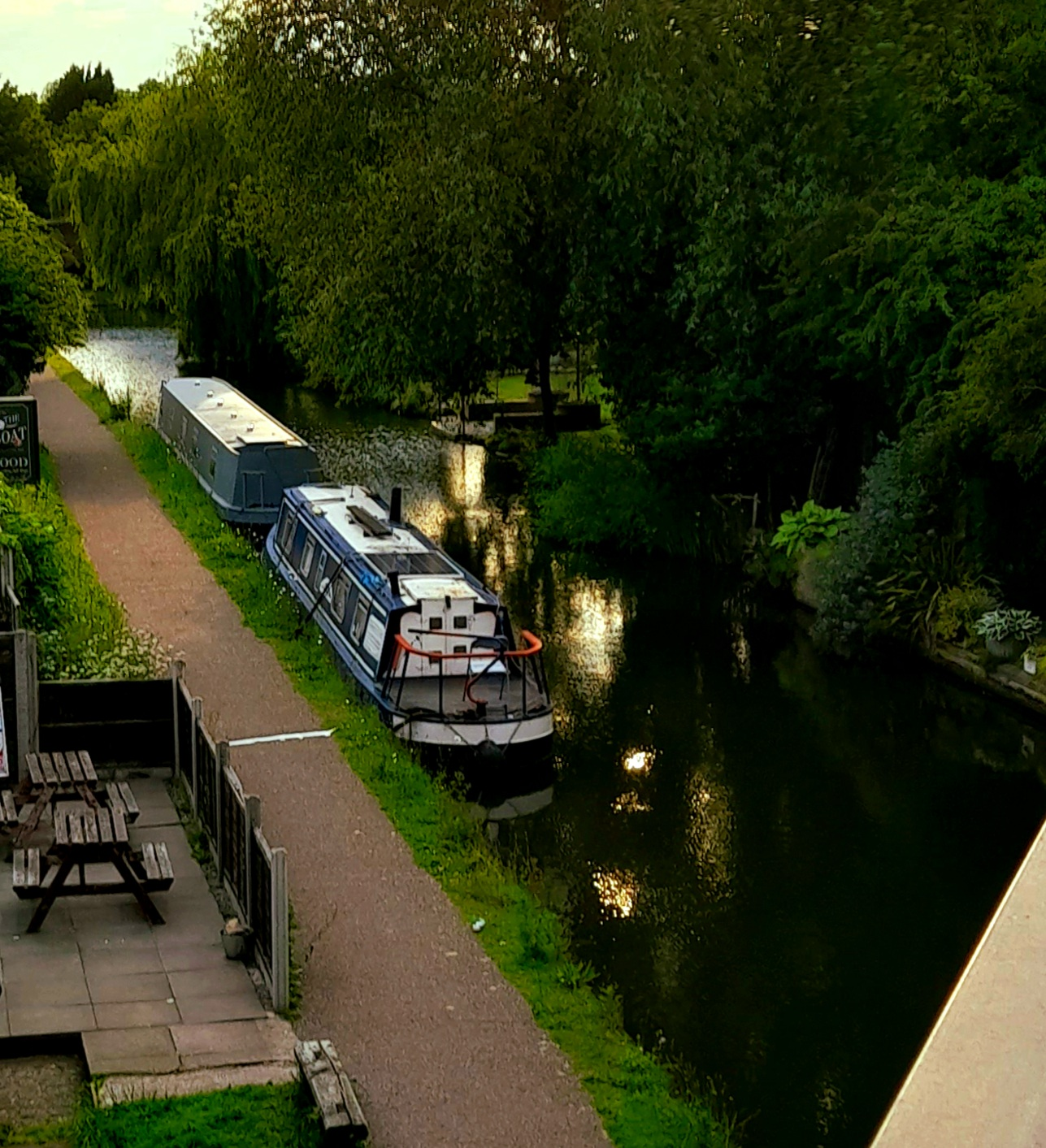

- Location within the West Midlands
- Area: 19.97 km^{2} (7.71 sq mi)
- Population: 16,437
  - Density: 823/km^{2} (2,130/sq mi)
- OS grid reference: SP135935
- Metropolitan borough: Birmingham
- Metropolitan county: West Midlands
- Region: West Midlands
- Country: England
- Sovereign state: United Kingdom
- Post town: SUTTON COLDFIELD
- Dialling code: 0121
- Police: West Midlands
- Fire: West Midlands
- Ambulance: West Midlands
- UK Parliament: Sutton Coldfield

Sutton Walmley and Minworth is one of 69 electoral wards in Birmingham, England.

Sutton Walmley and Minworth is one of the eight wards that make up the Parliamentary Constituency of Sutton Coldfield and the Royal Sutton Coldfield Town Council. The ward is made up of the Walmley village, Minworth village, the Wiggins Hill hamlet and the Peddimore Hamlet.

Abbreviation: S.W.M

== History ==
=== Walmley ===
The origins of Walmley are unknown, however, it is believed it may have formed as a community for workers at the nearby halls of Langley Hall, New Hall Manor, Penns Hall and Peddimore Hall. It may have originally begun at a point near Penns Hall as it had a major influence in the area, employing many for its activities in Penns Mill and other industries. A small community of Langley developed on the Fox Hollies Road and was mentioned in the Domesday Book, however, it was nothing more than a hamlet with no church, inn or community meeting centre.

John Vesey, Bishop of Exeter, played a small role in Walmley's early development through the construction of several buildings in the area. These were some of 51 stone cottages built by the Bishop who was concerned with the deteriorating state of Sutton Coldfield as a whole. One of these cottages was the ford keeper's house on the banks of Plants Brook, which enabled travellers to pass along Wylde Green Road and over the ford in safety. The building is now listed.

Walmley would have developed from a few scattered houses along Walmley Road which was a main commuter route from Sutton Coldfield to Birmingham. To the north were several farms including one built by Bishop Vesey. Most of the properties were built at the junctions with other roads such as Penns Lane and Fox Hollies Road.

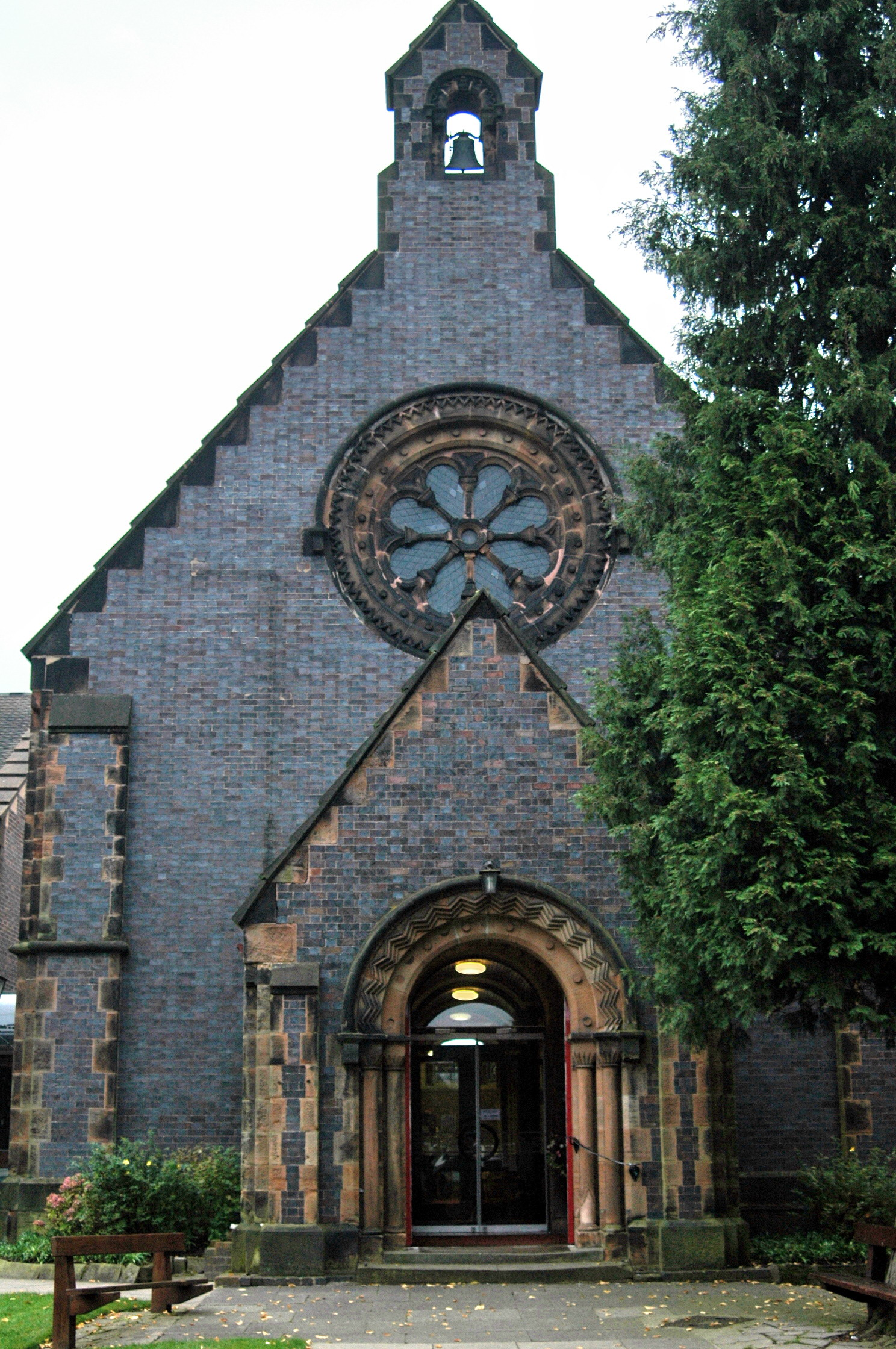
St John's Church by D.R. Hill.

Walmley developed in the 19th century into a prominent area of Sutton Coldfield. It became one of four ecclesiastical districts formed from the parish of Sutton Coldfield, with the others being Boldmere, Hill and Sutton Coldfield. Walmley's first church, St John the Evangelist Church, was built in 1845. The ecclesiastical parish of Walmley was formed in 1846 with St John the Evangelist Church becoming the parish church. Walmley developed into a ward of the Sutton Corporation, covering an area of 4,424 of the total 13,030 acres (52.7 km^{2}) of Sutton Coldfield. Despite being part of the Sutton Corporation area, Walmley was incorporated into the Erdington postal area. Walmley Ash, in the southern part of Walmley, was incorporated into the Minworth postal area.

In 1879, Penns railway station was constructed by the Midland Railway Company and, despite being located in Walmley, it was named after Penns.

Towards the end of the century, the population did not change. In 1881, the population was recorded at being 1,301 and the same number was recorded for 1884.

At the turn of the 20th century, Walmley remained a rural village featuring a church, a few houses and an inn (The Fox Inn). Schools began to establish themselves in the area throughout the 1920s and 1930s. New homes were also constructed along the Walmley Road and Penns Lane as a result of ribbon development. During World War II, Walmley housed an Italian prisoner of war camp near Jones Wood.

After World War II, Walmley was transformed into a 'boom suburb' through the construction of new housing estates. This was a result of its proximity to the large Birmingham conurbation. The green belt land surrounding the village was destroyed for the construction of these properties mainly to the south of the village.

More recently, Walmley has been targeted as part of a local development plan, called the "Walmley Local Action Plan" aimed at improving facilities in Walmley. Information from the 1991 national census published in the plan shows the town's population had, by then, risen rapidly to a total of 17,294.

=== Minworth ===
Minworth and Curdworth both originated in the 6th or 7th centuries, being established by Angle settlers, and are historically associated with the Arden family (William Shakespeare's maternal relations). Peddimore Hall is a double-moated farmstead and can be associated with the Ardens from 1298 until 1659. The present farmhouse can be dated to the 16th century. Minworth was originally a hamlet in the parish of Curdworth in the hundred of Hemlingford. Minworth then became a civil parish in the Castle Bromwich Rural District of Warwickshire from 1894 to 1912, then becoming part of the Meriden Rural District. In 1931 the parish was abolished, with the populated parts being split between Sutton Coldfield and Birmingham, and an area of unpopulated land going to Castle Bromwich parish. When excavations were undertaken for Minworth sewage works, evidence of the Pleistocene period was found here, including the fossilised bones of a mammoth which walked this way one million years ago.

The name of the settlement was documented in the Domesday Book as Meneworde, from the Old English "Mynna's worth", 'Mynna's farmstead'. Although Mynna is not found recorded elsewhere as a personal name, it is believed to be such. At that time Minworth was a small and poor manor of only one hide, around 50 hectares. There was sufficient land for one ploughteam, but land only equivalent to half a ploughteam was under cultivation, worked by a single villein. The manor had 2 hectares (5 acres) of meadow presumably along the north bank of the River Tame and a small amount of woodland, half a league long by three furlongs wide (2.4 × 0.6 km).

Before the Norman Conquest an Anglo-Saxon, Godric, had held the manor from Thorkell, Lord of Warwick, and he continued to hold it thereafter. Norman lords were in control of most of the Birmingham manors by 1086. Pre Conquest, In the time of King Edward the Confessor, the value for tax purposes was five shillings, and this was still the same in 1086.

Minworth Mill on the River Tame ground corn here from at least the 14th century until 1872. By the middle of the 18th century, the mill was also taking advantage of Birmingham's successful armaments trade and was engaged in boring gun barrels. All traces of the mill are now gone, obliterated by a late 20th-century industrial estate which stands on the site half a mile west of Water Orton Bridge. However, traces of watercourses are still visible.

Plans to revitalise Minworth in the past have met with a cool reception. A council plan aimed to construct new housing and shops and to encourage new industry into the area. However, residents did not back the plan as they wanted Minworth to remain the same. Another plan to develop an 11-acre (4 hectare) patch of land into a canal-side marina also met with disapproval from residents, who did not want the Birmingham and Fazeley Canal to become a busy area.

=== Wiggins Hill ===
In the fields nearby, Roman coins of the third and fourth centuries have been found, also earthwork features of medieval times.

The main buildings in Wiggins Hill date to the 17th century. There is a half-timbered cottage with a large barn and a farmhouse with a Dutch gable. Wiggins Hill was a major meeting place for Quakers, with a meeting house and cottage being built there in 1724 by the group. Construction cost £100, of which £40 was raised by collections in the county. However, by the 19th century, the number of those attending was low resulting in the closure of the meeting house, which eventually fell into dilapidation.

Wiggins Hill did consist of a 15th-century timber-framed house named Wincelle (the name of the hamlet in Magna Carta); however, in 1910, it was dismantled and reassembled at its current site overlooking New Hall Valley Country Park, in New Hall Valley on the Wylde Green Road in Walmley, Sutton Coldfield.

== Population and housing ==
According to the 2011 Population Census, there were 16,437 people living in Sutton Walmley and Minworth.

Most housing within the area is modern semi-detached and detached. Around Walmley the housing is pre-war build, though in areas towards Minworth, Thimble End and Falcon Lodge, it is more modern housing dating from the 1970's. New housing estates have been built on the former Warren House Farm and New Shipton Farmland, creating New Hall Manor Estate and a new addition to the New Hall Estate.

== Politics ==
Two councillors represent Sutton Walmley and Minworth on Birmingham City Council. In the 2022 local elections David Barrie won with 2223 votes, and Ken Wood won with 1862 votes, both representing the Conservative Party.

| Sutton Warmley and Minworth | David Barrie | Conservative | 2009– |
| Sutton Warmley and Minworth | Ken Wood | Conservative | 2008–2012, 2014– |

=== List of candidates in S.W.M. local election 2022 ===
| Conservative | David Stuart Barrie | 2223 |
| Conservative | Ken Wood | 1862 |
| Labour | Joseph Anselm Blenkinsop | 770 |
| Labour | Ruth Anna Jane Wilde | 656 |
| Lib Dems | David Cooke | 415 |
| Lib Dems | James Austin Garrington | 382 |
| Green Party | Colin Leslie Fredric Marriott | 384 |

== Places of interest ==
As a result of the construction of the New Hall Manor Estate, New Hall Valley Country Park was created with Plants Brook flowing through it. At the end of Plants Brook, a local nature reserve has been created from reservoirs constructed by Birmingham City Council. New Hall Mill, one of Birmingham's only two existing water mills, has been refurbished back to working order and is open on specific days to the public.

Walmley Library and Community Hall are located within the ward and has been refurbished.

== Education ==
=== Minworth ===
Minworth Junior and Infant School came late to the village. A small school for infants was opened in 1897 and a 35 year old village woman, Emma Hughes, was appointed the mistress. All other children had to brave the elements and attend schools in the nearby villages. The infant school was situated at the side of the wheelwright's shop but it soon became overcrowded and inadequate. The board of education threatened to withdraw financial support from the school unless new premises were found, and a permanent village schoolroom became a priority. On 29 December 1900 a new building was opened on the opposite side of the green. This proved to be a great improvement on the accommodation that the children had experienced in the wheelwright's shop, yet Minworth still had no provision for schooling children over the age of 7 years. For these children, school meant walking to one of the nearby villages to continue their education. With the growing success of Emma Hughes' infant department the necessity for a new school to accommodate the older village children became essential.

=== Walmley ===
There are numerous primary schools located within Walmley. The first school to be established in the area was a charity school. Founded in 1792, it was financed from funds impounded by the Courts in respect to acts of alleged mismanagement by the Sutton Corporation. It was constructed on the area known as Beyond The Wood along with an adjacent house for the school headmistress. The school had a capacity of 60 children until 1851, when it was moved to a larger school was built next to the church. The buildings were converted into two cottages. This was known as Walmley Corporation School.

Walmley First School on Walmley Ash Road was built in 1956 when the infants transferred from the old village school to the premises. The juniors remained in the old school prior to the building of Walmley Middle School in 1974. These two schools are now Walmley Infants School and Walmley Junior School and are run by the Birmingham Local Education Authority. Walmley Infants School has a pupil capacity of 270 children. It is grant-maintained, as is Walmley Junior School which has a pupil capacity of 356.

The Deanery Church of England Infants and Junior School on Fox Hollies Road is also grant-maintained. The school was built in 1980 with construction commencing on 1 March 1979. It was initially two schools, however, merged in the 1990s. The Little Hollies Nursery was opened by the Bishop of Aston for the school in 1998.

There is a private primary school also located in Walmley, on Walmley Ash Road. The Shrubbery School was founded in 1930 by Janice Rankin. It features a nursery, infants and juniors department. The Shrubbery School building is Grade B locally listed.

There are no secondary schools in Walmley, however, Bishop Walsh Catholic School is near the border of Walmley on Wylde Green Road in the west. Two comprehensive schools, John Willmott School and Fairfax School are also located in nearby Falcon Lodge.
