= New Hall =

New Hall may refer to:

- New Hall, Fazakerley, a historic complex that was originally a model village, in Liverpool, England
- New Hall, Hedon, an 18th-century house in the East Riding of Yorkshire, England
- New Hall, Woodford, a 17th-century cottage in Woodford, Greater Manchester, England
- New Hall moated site, a scheduled monument in Tyldesley, Greater Manchester, England
- New Hall Manor, a medieval manor house, now used as a hotel, in Sutton Coldfield, West Midlands, England
  - New Hall Manor Estate, the younger of two housing estates in Walmley, West Midlands named after New Hall Manor
  - New Hall Estate, the older of two housing estates in Walmley, West Midlands named after New Hall Manor
  - Sutton New Hall (ward), an electoral ward in Birmingham, England, named after New Hall Manor
- New Hall Place, an office complex in Liverpool, England
- New Hall School, an independent school in Boreham, Chelmsford, Essex, England
- New Hall, a Cambridge University college now known as Murray Edwards College, Cambridge
- New Hall, now known as Agnes Blackadder Hall, a hall of residence at the University of St Andrews, Scotland
- HM Prison New Hall, a prison in Flockton, West Yorkshire, England
- New Hall is located next to Carpenters' Hall at the Independence National Historical Park in Philadelphia, United States and is currently the home of the New Hall Military Museum

== See also ==
- Newhall (disambiguation)
- New Town Hall (disambiguation)
