= Walmley =

Village in the West Midlands, England

Coordinates: 52°32′26″N 1°48′01″W

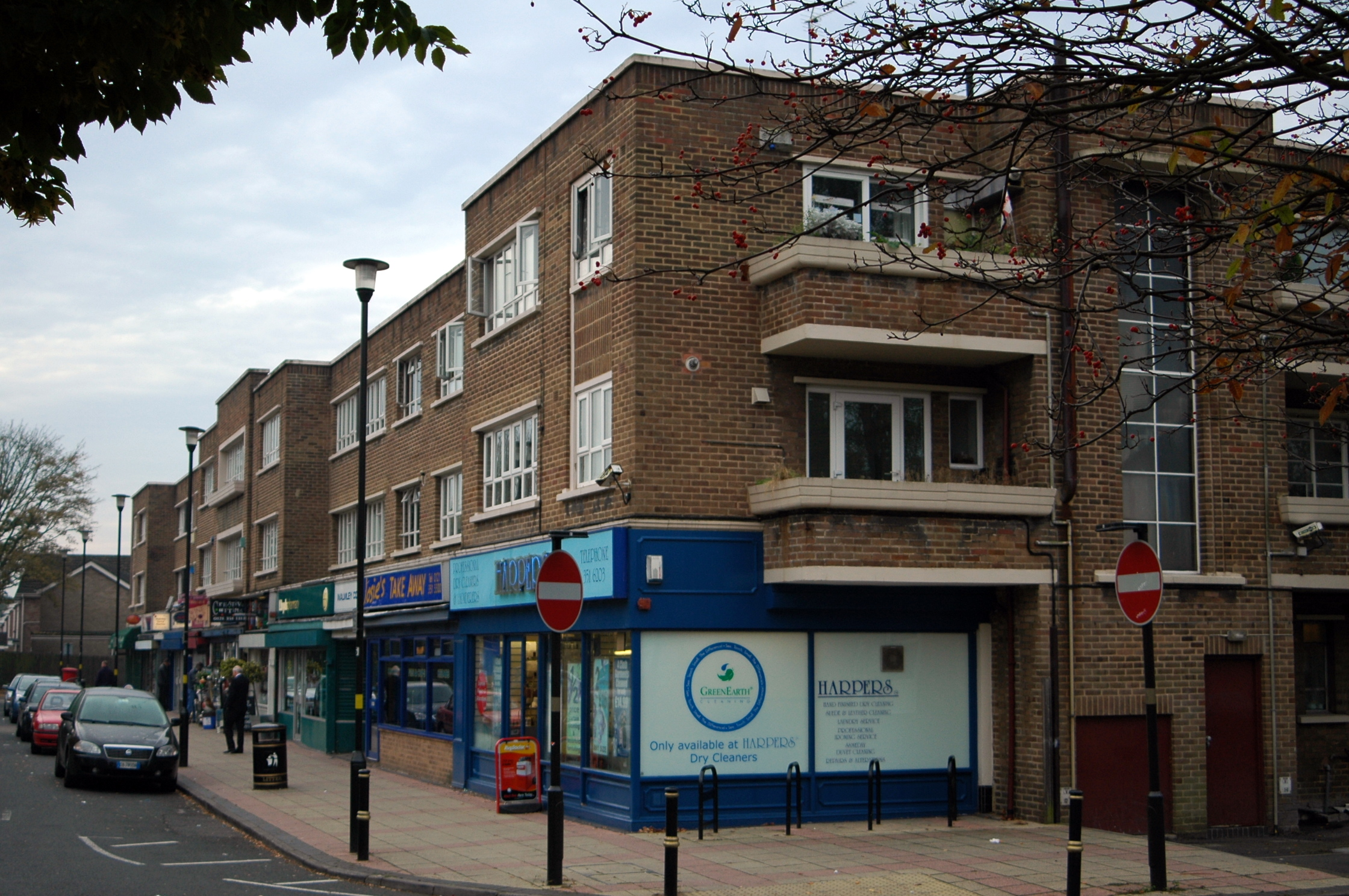
- Walmley Court shops and flats in Walmley village.

- Location within the West Midlands
- OS grid reference: SP135935
- Civil parish: Sutton Coldfield
- Metropolitan borough: Birmingham
- Metropolitan county: West Midlands
- Region: West Midlands
- Country: England
- Sovereign state: United Kingdom
- Post town: SUTTON COLDFIELD
- Postcode district: B76
- Dialling code: 0121
- Police: West Midlands
- Fire: West Midlands
- Ambulance: West Midlands
- UK Parliament: Sutton Coldfield

Walmley is a suburban village situated in the civil parish of Sutton Coldfield, West Midlands. It lies within the City of Birmingham on its northeastern outer fringe, where it forms part of the Sutton Walmley and Minworth electoral ward. It is in southern Sutton Coldfield, close to Minworth, Erdington, Wylde Green, Pype Hayes and south of Thimble End. It is approximately 7 miles (11.3 km) northeast of Birmingham City Centre. It is the main focus of the Sutton New Hall Birmingham City Council ward.

== History ==
The origins of Walmley are unknown, however, it is believed it may have formed as a community for workers at the nearby halls of Langley Hall, New Hall Manor, Penns Hall and Peddimore Hall. It may have originally begun at a point near Penns Hall as it had a major influence in the area, employing many for its activities in Penns Mill and other industries. A small community of Langley developed on the Fox Hollies Road and was mentioned in the Domesday Book, however, it was nothing more than a hamlet with no church, inn or community meeting centre.

John Vesey, Bishop of Exeter, played a small role in Walmley's early development through the construction of several buildings in the area. These were some of 51 stone cottages built by the Bishop who was concerned with the deteriorating state of Sutton Coldfield as a whole. One of these cottages was the ford keeper's house on the banks of Plants Brook, which enabled travellers to pass along Wylde Green Road and over the ford in safety. The building is now listed.

Walmley would have developed from a few scattered houses along Walmley Road which was a main commuter route from Sutton Coldfield to Birmingham. To the north were several farms including one built by Bishop Vesey. Most of the properties were built at the junctions with other roads such as Penns Lane and Fox Hollies Road.

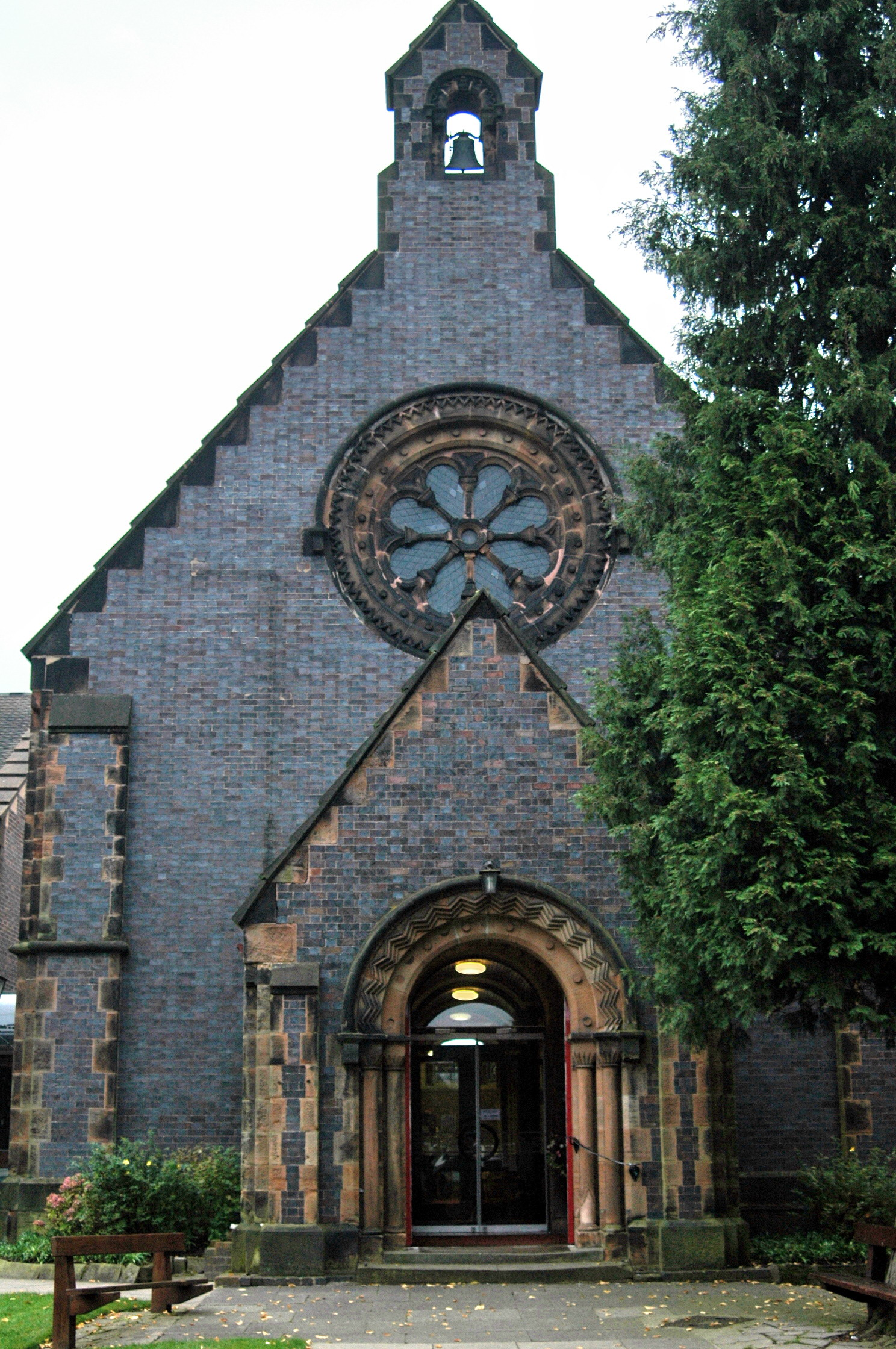
St John's Church by D.R. Hill.

Walmley developed in the 19th century into a prominent area of Sutton Coldfield. It became one of four ecclesiastical districts formed from the parish of Sutton Coldfield, with the others being Boldmere, Hill and Sutton Coldfield. Walmley's first church, St John the Evangelist Church, was built in 1845. The ecclesiastical parish of Walmley was formed in 1846 with St John the Evangelist Church becoming the parish church. Walmley developed into a ward of the Sutton Corporation, covering an area of 4,424 of the total 13,030 acres (52.7 km^{2}) of Sutton Coldfield. Despite being part of the Sutton Corporation area, Walmley was incorporated into the Erdington postal area. Walmley Ash, in the southern part of Walmley, was incorporated into the Minworth postal area.

In 1879, Penns railway station was constructed by the Midland Railway Company and, despite being located in Walmley, it was named after Penns.

Towards the end of the century, the population did not change. In 1881, the population was recorded at being 1,301 and the same number was recorded for 1884.

At the turn of the 20th century, Walmley remained a rural village featuring a church, a few houses and an inn (The Fox Inn). Schools began to establish themselves in the area throughout the 1920s and 1930s. New homes were also constructed along the Walmley Road and Penns Lane as a result of ribbon development. During World War II, Walmley housed an Italian prisoner of war camp near Jones Wood.

After World War II, Walmley was transformed into a 'boom suburb' through the construction of new housing estates. This was a result of its proximity to the large Birmingham conurbation. The green belt land surrounding the village was destroyed for the construction of these properties mainly to the south of the village.

More recently, Walmley has been targeted as part of a local development plan, called the "Walmley Local Action Plan" aimed at improving facilities in Walmley. Information from the 1991 national census published in the plan shows the town's population had, by then, risen rapidly to a total of 17,294.

== Geography ==
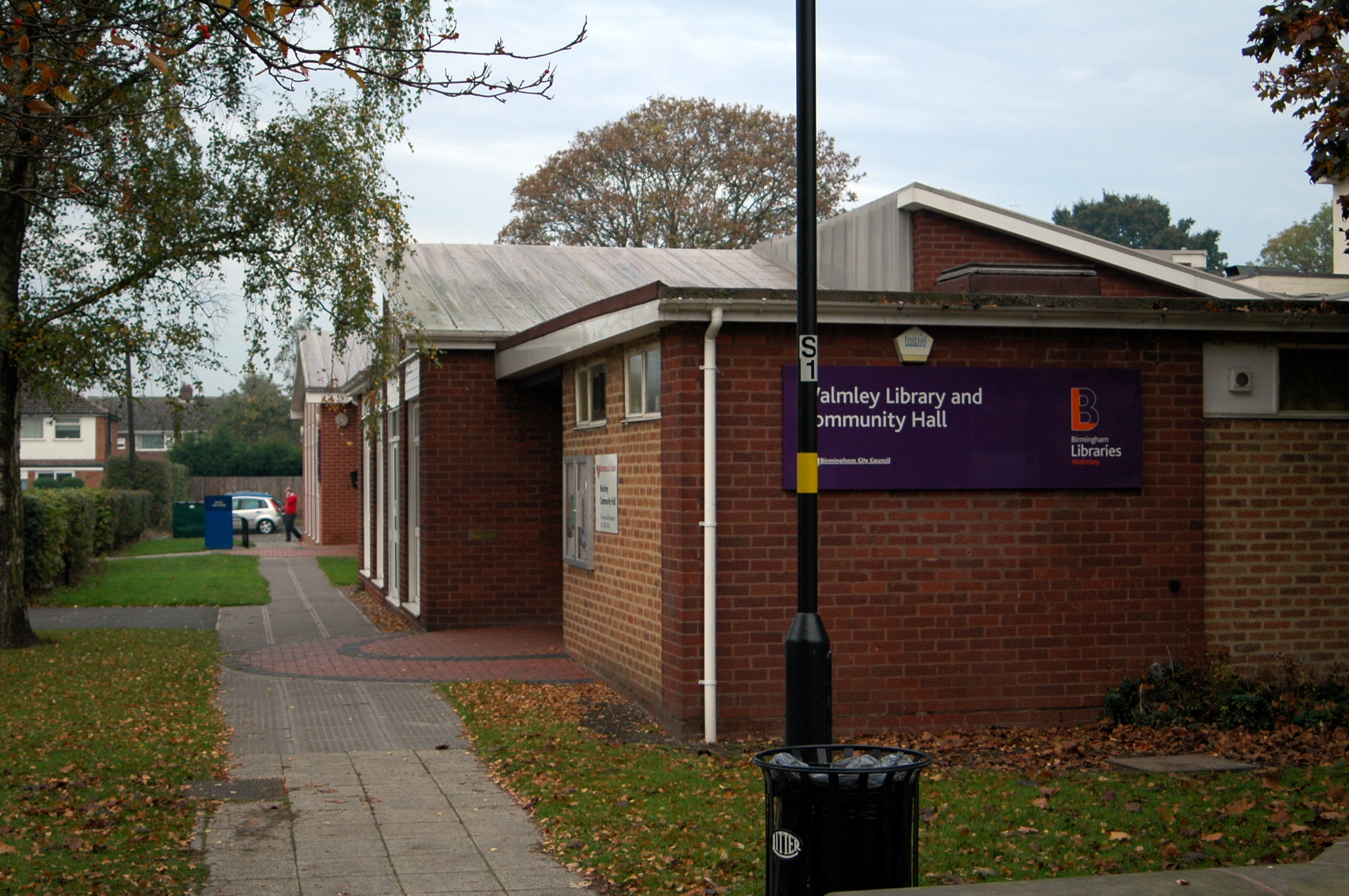
Walmley Village and Community Hall in Walmley Village.

Walmley is four kilometres southeast of Sutton Coldfield town centre and eleven kilometres northeast of Birmingham city centre. To the west of Walmley is the Wylde Green and Erdington areas, to which Walmley is connected by a road running through the New Hall Valley, which features the New Hall Valley Country Park and the Plantsbrook Local Nature Reserve. To the east, a road runs towards Minworth and the main A38 dual carriageway. Falcon Lodge and Reddicap Heath are directly north of Walmley. To the south, along Eachelhurst Road, is Pype Hayes in the district of Erdington.

The central area of Walmley where the shops are located is known as Walmley Village.

Plants Brook (originally known as Ebrook) flows from the west of Walmley to the south of the area. It flows through New Hall Country Park in a channelled section, and it once provided power to New Hall Mill, near New Hall Manor. In the northern area of Walmley Village, on Fox Hollies Road, is a small wooded area of land known as Jones Wood. It is now protected and preserved. To the west of this was a small area of land known as Beyond The Wood to locals. Archaeological excavations of this parkland have revealed that it maybe historically significant.

Walmley is a reasonably affluent suburb, containing many large detached and semi-detached houses, and despite large-scale residential development in the post-war period, it retains a distinct identity from other local areas.

== Places of interest ==
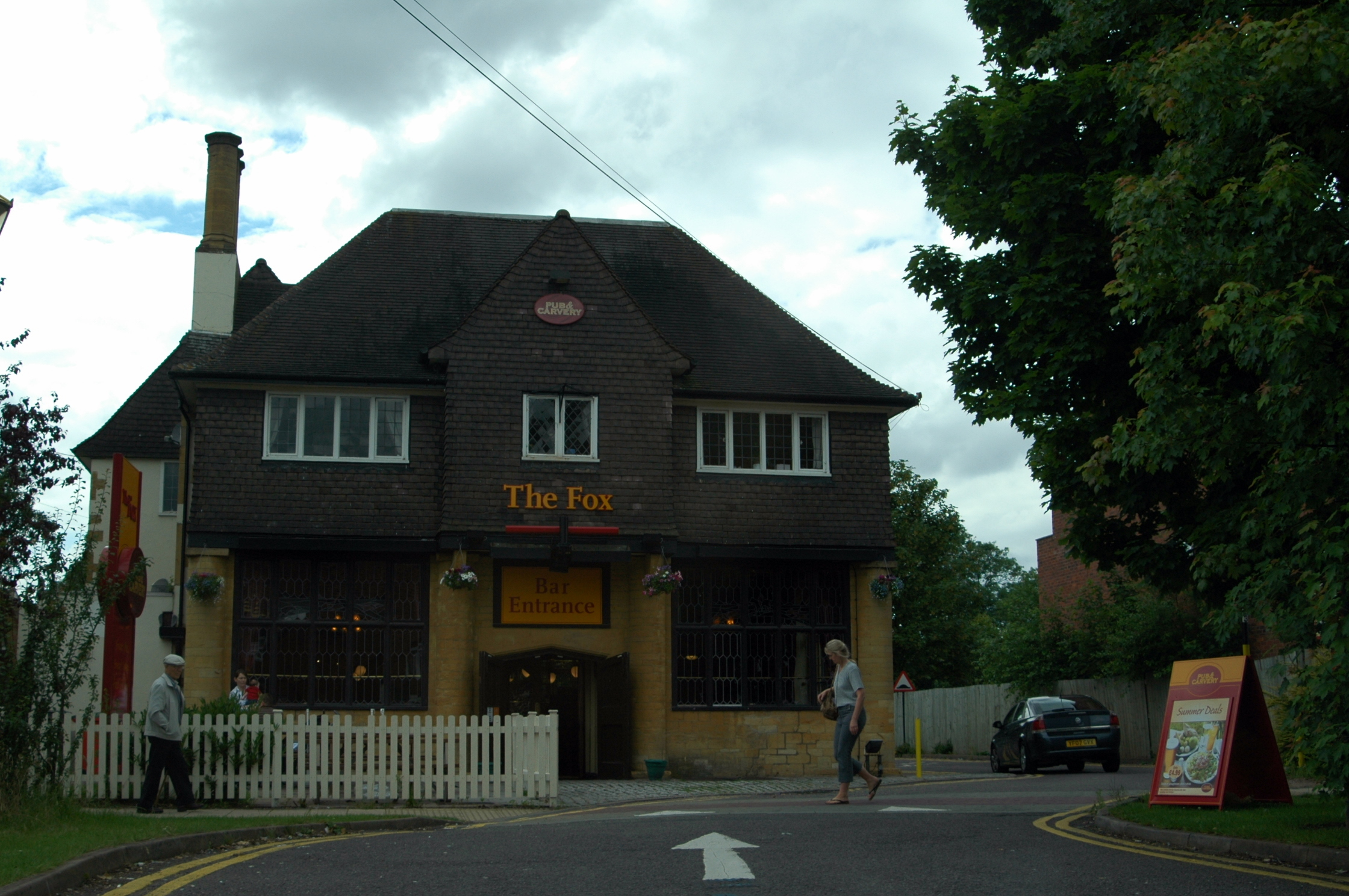
The Fox pub in Walmley village. The current building dates to the 1930s, though a pub has been sited here for much longer.

The oldest part of Walmley is New Hall Manor. It claims to be the oldest inhabited moated house in Great Britain. It also has two large housing estates named after it. The first one is the New Hall estate and the other is the New Hall Manor Estate also known as The Grange in some parts. The New Hall Manor Estate is newer by 30 years than the New Hall Estate.

The main shopping parade, Walmley Village, was refurbished in 2004 in line with Birmingham City Council's "Walmley Village Local Action Plan", with new paving surfaces, car parking spaces, and a 20 mph (32 km/h) through road speed limit. The local Walmley Library and Community Hall was also refurbished. The main pub in Walmley is "The Fox Inn", which has been serving the area for a long time. The present building has existed since the 1930s. It underwent a refurbishment in 2005 when it came under the possession of new owners.

St Johns Church, built in 1845 to a design by D. R. Hill, is located on Walmley Road and is constructed of Staffordshire blue brick. It is the parish church for Walmley and is of a Norman architectural style. However, the building has been criticised in the past by authors such as Nikolaus Pevsner who criticised the lack of stone, and the use of industrial bricks in a religious building. An extension to the church was built alongside it in the 1990s to house community facilities. It is an Anglican church in the Diocese of Birmingham.

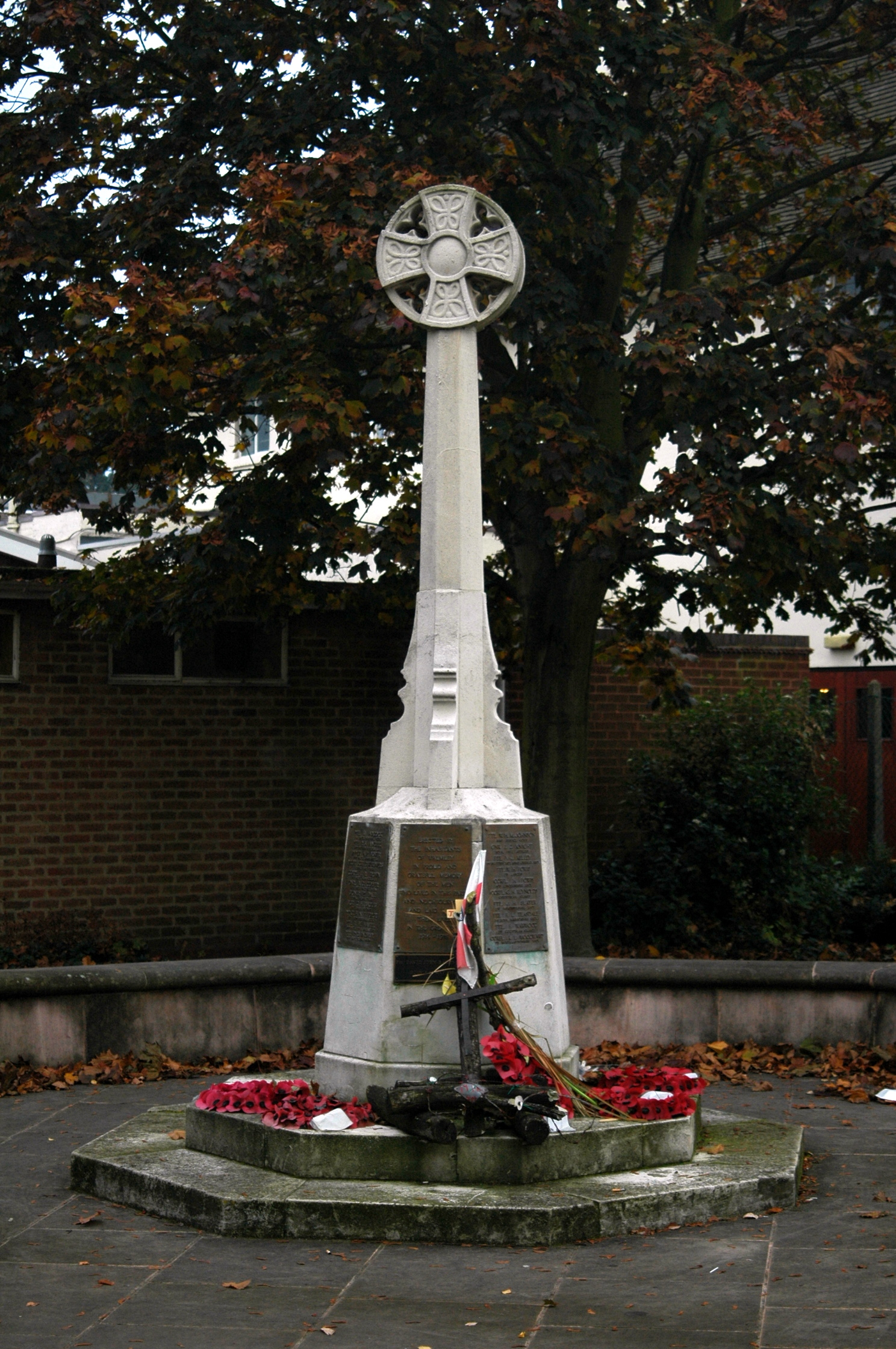
Walmley's war memorial is located next to 'The Fox Inn'.

At the junction of Walmley Road and Fox Hollies Road, north of Walmley Village, are almshouses constructed in the 19th century, 1924 and 1971. The first two cottages were built in 1828 and the second two in 1863. They are Grade II listed. The almshouses of 1971 were opened by The Princess Anne who also unveiled a commemorative plaque. The almshouses are named Lingard House, recalling the name of the benefactress, Frances Lingard, who was a local spinster. The front buildings are now used as offices for Sutton Municipal Charities. Located in front of the buildings at the junction was a war memorial which was funded by public subscription. It was unveiled in 1920 and has since been moved to a spot next to "The Fox Inn", behind Walmley Library as part of the Walmley Local Action Plan.

A popular local landmark was Walmley House, which was built in the 1860s by the Horsfall family as part of the Penns Hall estate. In the 1960s, the house was sold for £142,000 wand in the spring of 1969, demolished for the construction of new houses.

Overlooking New Hall Country Park, on Wylde Green Road, is Wincelle, a 15th-century timber-framed house. It was originally built in the area of Wigginshill, however, in 1910, it was dismantled and reassembled at its current site. Wincelle is the old name for Wigginshill, under the name it appeared in the Domesday Book.

There are 16 listed buildings and four locally listed buildings in Walmley. A study was carried out into the area to determine whether conservation area status was feasible for the area; however, the sparseness of the locations meant that the plan deemed infeasible. There have been 43 archaeological finds in the Walmley area including prehistoric flints, Roman and Medieval Pottery, a possible prehistoric structure, and earthworks of medieval and post-medieval date. The majority of finds have been discovered in the east of the area alongside the Sutton Coldfield Bypass.

Sutton Coldfield Rugby Club's ground is located on Walmley Road straddling the border of Walmley and Thimble End. The ground was also the home of Four Oaks Cricket Club until 2009 . In 1977 an agreement was reached between Four Oaks Cricket Club and Sutton Coldfield Rugby Club to form the Sutton Coldfield Recreational Trust. The needs of the Cricket Club and the Rugby Club were basically the same, they both needed a ground that could be developed with a lengthy lease. The Governments Boundary changes created the opportunity. In the last days before Sutton Coldfield became part of Birmingham, Sutton Coldfield Borough Council gave Sutton Coldfield Rugby Club and Four Oaks Cricket Club the chance to develop the 16-acre agricultural site on Walmley Road as a sports area. In 1982 the Trust was presented with a further opportunity to purchase an extra six acres of land next to the cricket pitch for use by the Rugby Club and other site users. Members of the two clubs constructed the main club building in 1977, and there have been a number of major extensions added over the years

== Transport ==
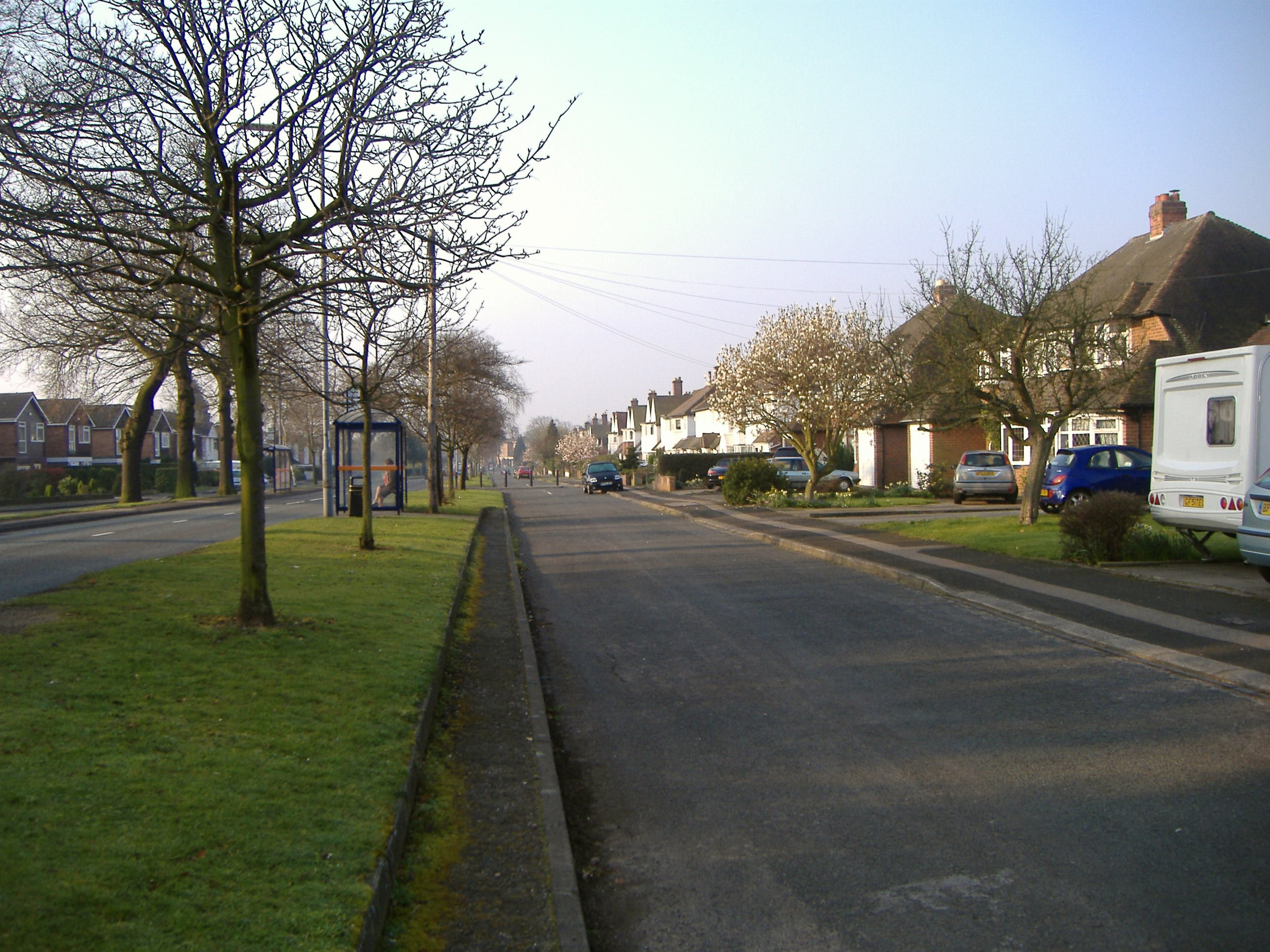
Walmley Road looking towards Walmley Village. To the right are 1930s semi-detached houses and to the left are 1970s detached houses.

A railway station once served Walmley, Penns (for Walmley) Station on the Sutton Park Line, which was closed in 1964 as part of the Beeching Axe even though it was very well patronised. The station has since been demolished. There was also a very busy goods yard in Eachelhurst Road which is now a housing estate. The Sutton Park Line is no longer in passenger use and is for freight use only.

Walmley Village is served by several National Express West Midlands buses that run from Sutton Coldfield town centre. The 71 bus which continues via Chelmsley Wood. National Express West Midlands also run the X14 which is the most direct route to Birmingham City Centre which travels through Gravelly Hill and into the city via the A38(M) (Aston Expressway).

The Walmley Road was known as a major thoroughfare from Sutton Coldfield town centre to Birmingham. It has been recorded that it was one of the most heavily trafficked roads in the area leading to congestion. Despite this, plans to widen the road to accommodate more traffic have been strongly opposed by residents, who formed the Walmley Residents' Association, who claimed that it would destroy the village atmosphere and that it would be contrary to the spirit of the Civic Society Act. The Sutton Coldfield Civic Society backed the residents in 1967, which resulted in the plans being scrapped. Speed bumps have since been installed on the road in Walmley village to reduce the speed of vehicles, as part of the Walmley Local Action Plan, and a 20 mph speed limit has been imposed for the whole length of the main road and the roads through the adjoining residential estate.

The roads in Walmley were recorded in 1905 as being nothing more than dusty country tracks.

== Education ==
Fox Hollies Road and Walmley Ash Road house several nurseries such as the Paint Pot Nursery, Seesaw Day Nursery, Little Hollies Nursery and the nurseries run by the Shrubbery School and Walmley Infant School.

There are numerous primary schools located within Walmley. The first school to be established in the area was a charity school. Founded in 1792, it was financed from funds impounded by the Courts in respect to acts of alleged mismanagement by the Sutton Corporation. It was constructed on the area known as Beyond The Wood along with an adjacent house for the school headmistress. The school had a capacity of 60 children until 1851, when it was moved to a larger school was built next to the church. The buildings were converted into two cottages. This was known as Walmley Corporation School.

Walmley First School on Walmley Ash Road was built in 1956 when the infants transferred from the old village school to the premises. The juniors remained in the old school prior to the building of Walmley Middle School in 1974. An Italian prisoner of war camp once occupied the land they are built on during World War II. These two schools are now Walmley Infants School and Walmley Junior School and are run by the Birmingham Local Education Authority. Walmley Infants School has a pupil capacity of 270 children. It is grant-maintained, as is Walmley Junior School which has a pupil capacity of 356.

The Deanery Church of England Infants and Junior School on Fox Hollies Road is also grant-maintained. The school was built in 1980 with construction commencing on 1 March 1979. It was initially two schools, however, merged in the 1990s. The Little Hollies Nursery was opened by the Bishop of Aston for the school in 1998.

There is a private primary school also located in Walmley, on Walmley Ash Road. The Shrubbery School was founded in 1930 by Janice Rankin. It features a nursery, infants and juniors department. The Shrubbery School building is Grade B locally listed.

There are no secondary schools in Walmley, however, Bishop Walsh Catholic School is near the border of Walmley on Wylde Green Road in the west. Two comprehensive schools, John Willmott School and Fairfax School are also located in nearby Falcon Lodge.
