= Sutton New Hall (ward) =

Electoral ward in Birmingham, England

Coordinates: 52.5363°N 1.7886°W

- Ward
- Location within the West Midlands
- Area: 7.60 sq mi (19.7 km^{2})
- Population: 22,455 (2011.Ward)
  - Density: 2,955/sq mi (1,141/km^{2})
- OS grid reference: SP135935
- Metropolitan borough: Birmingham
- Metropolitan county: West Midlands
- Region: West Midlands
- Country: England
- Sovereign state: United Kingdom
- Post town: SUTTON COLDFIELD
- Postcode district: B76
- Dialling code: 0121
- Police: West Midlands
- Fire: West Midlands
- Ambulance: West Midlands
- UK Parliament: Sutton Coldfield

Sutton New Hall is one of the 40 electoral wards in Birmingham, England and is named after New Hall, a medieval manor house.

Sutton New Hall is one of the four wards that make up the Parliamentary Constituency and formal district of Sutton Coldfield. The ward lies to the south-east of Sutton Coldfield town centre and covers Walmley, Walmley Ash, Thimble End and Minworth. It covers an area of 7.60 square miles (4,860 acres; 19.7 km^{2}).

== Population and housing ==
According to the 2001 Population Census, there were 21,487 people living in 8,896 households in Sutton New Hall rising to a population of 22,455 in 9,433 households at the 2011 Census.

Most housing within the area is modern semi-detached and detached. Around Walmley the housing is pre-war build, though in areas towards Minworth, Thimble End and Falcon Lodge, it is more modern housing dating from the 1970s. New housing estates have been built in Thimble End and also on the former Warren House Farm and New Shipton Farmland, creating New Hall Manor Estate and a new addition to the New Hall Estate.

== Politics ==
The three councillors presently representing Sutton New Hall on Birmingham City Council are David Barrie, Dennis Birbeck and James Bird, all of the Conservative Party.

The ward has adopted a Ward Support Officer.

== Places of interest ==
As a result of the construction of the New Hall Manor Estate, New Hall Valley Country Park was created with Plants Brook flowing through it. At the end of Plants Brook, a local nature reserve has been created from reservoirs constructed by Birmingham City Council. New Hall Mill, one of Birmingham's only two existing water mills, has been refurbished back to working order and is open on specific days to the public.

Walmley Library and Community Hall are located within the ward and have recently been refurbished as part of the "Walmley Local Action Plan".
