= Thimble End =

Area of Sutton Coldfield, Birmingham, England

Coordinates: 52.54818°N 1.80235°W

Thimble End is a neighbourhood on the outskirts of Sutton Coldfield, Birmingham, England. It has been developed several times with the construction and expansion of housing estates on the land with the most recent being completed in 2005.

Situated between Walmley, Minworth and Signal Hayes, the area is small in comparison to Walmley and Minworth and is covered by the Sutton New Hall ward. The area was once farmland used by farmers residing in Walmley and Minworth however the need for extra living space after World War II prompted the construction of a small housing estate on the site. This was further expanded in the 1970s and the final part of the farmland was constructed on by 2005. The newest housing estate was named Thimble End Court. Birmingham City Council also developed land adjacent to the newest estate by constructing a £98,000 children's play area.

The road that forms the eastern boundary of the estate is called Thimble End Road.
