= Newhall =

Newhall may refer to:

== Places ==
=== in Ireland ===
- Newhall House and Estate, 17th century mansion in County Clare

=== in England ===
- Newhall, Cheshire
- Newhall, Derbyshire
- Newhall, Essex, an area within Harlow
- Newhall, South Yorkshire, an area within Sheffield
- Newhall, alternative name of the Palace of Beaulieu

=== in the United States ===
- Newhall, Santa Clarita, California, a district of Santa Clarita that was formerly independent
- Newhall, Iowa
- Newhall, Washington, a former town on Orcas Island
- Newhall, alternate name of the Highwood neighborhood in Hamden, Connecticut, adjacent to the Newhallville neighborhood in New Haven
- Mount Newhall, a mountain in Alaska

== People ==
- Christopher G. Newhall, American volcanologist
- George Newhall, namesake of the Newhallville neighborhood of New Haven, Connecticut
- George H. Newhall, thirty-fifth mayor of Lynn, Massachusetts
- Georgina Fraser Newhall (1860s–?), Canadian writer, stenographer
- Henry Newhall (1825–1882), American businessman, namesake of the California community
- William Newhall (1883–1950), American cricketer

== Events ==
- Newhall incident, a 1970 shootout involving the California Highway Patrol

== See also ==
- New Hall (disambiguation)
