= 2022 Birmingham City Council election =

Local election in the United Kingdom

- 5 May 2022

All 101 seats to Birmingham City Council 51 seats needed for a majority
- Registered: 751,157
- Turnout: 213,530; 28.4%

	First party	Second party
Leader	Ian Ward	Robert Alden
Party	Labour	Conservative
Leader's seat	Shard End	Erdington
Last election	67 seats, 50.2%	25 seats, 28.8%
Seats won	65	22
Seat change	▼2	▼3
Popular vote	169,977	90,650
Percentage	51.5%	27.5%
Swing	▲1.3%	▼1.3%
	Third party	Fourth party
Leader	Jon Hunt	Julien Pritchard
Party	Liberal Democrats	Green
Leader's seat	Perry Barr	Druids Heath and Monyhull
Last election	8 seats, 14.1%	1 seats, 4.4%
Seats won	12	2
Seat change	▲4	▲1
Popular vote	48,939	17,072
Percentage	14.8%	5.2%
Swing	▲0.7%	▲0.8%
- Winner of each seat at the 2022 Birmingham City Council election
Council control before election
Ian Ward
Labour
Council control after election
Ian Ward
Labour

The 2022 Birmingham City Council election took place on 5 May 2022, with all 101 council seats up for election across 37 single-member and 32 two-member wards. The election was held alongside other local elections across Great Britain and town council elections in Sutton Coldfield.

In the previous council election in 2018, the first all-out elections in Birmingham, Labour maintained its control of the council, winning 67 seats. The Conservatives formed the main opposition with twenty-five seats, with the Liberal Democrats on eight and the Green Party winning a single seat. In 2022, Labour maintained overall control. The Liberal Democrats and the Greens gained seats at the expense of Labour and the Conservatives.

== Background ==
Result of the 2018 council election

The Local Government Act 1972 created a two-tier system of metropolitan counties and boroughs covering Greater Manchester, Merseyside, South Yorkshire, Tyne and Wear, the West Midlands, and West Yorkshire starting in 1974. Birmingham is a district of the West Midlands metropolitan county. The Local Government Act 1985 abolished the metropolitan county councils, with the metropolitan boroughs individually taking on most of the county-level powers. The West Midlands Combined Authority was created in 2016 and began electing the mayor of the West Midlands from 2017, which was given strategic powers covering a region coterminous with the West Midlands metropolitan county.

Since its formation Birmingham City Council has variously been under Labour control, Conservative control and no overall control. Councillors have predominantly been elected from the Labour Party, Conservative Party and the Liberal Democrats. The council has had an overall Labour majority since the 2012 council election, when they regained control from the Conservative-Liberal Democrat coalition that had run the city since 2004. In the most recent council election in 2018, Labour won 67 seats with 50.2% of the vote, the Conservatives won 25 seats with 28.8% of the vote, the Liberal Democrats won 8 seats with 14.1% of the vote and the Green Party won a single seat with 4.4% of the vote.

The Labour councillor for Oscott Keith Linnecor died in February 2020, having served on the council for 25 years. Labour councillors for Billesley and Hall Green North, Lucy Seymour-Smith and Lou Robson, resigned. The former Labour council leader John Clancy also resigned his council seat in Quinton. Due to the COVID-19 pandemic, all four by-elections were held in May 2021 alongside the local elections across the country including the West Midlands mayoral election. The Labour candidates Katherine Carlisle and Saima Suleman were elected in Billesley and Hall Green North; while the Conservative candidates Darius Sandhu and Dominic Stanford made gains for their party in Oscott and Quinton. A Liberal Democrat councillor for Yardley East, Neil Eustace, died in September 2021. He had served on the council for 35 years. The Liberal Democrat candidate Deborah Harries successfully defended his seat in the October 2021 by-election. The Labour MP for Birmingham Erdington Jack Dromey died in January 2022. The Labour candidate Paulette Hamilton won the by-election held to fill the seat in March, with an increased share of the vote. The Labour councillor Zhor Malik defected to the Conservative Party in February 2022.

== Campaign ==
The Labour Party pledged to "treble" the number of speed cameras in the city if they were re-elected. The Liberal Democrats pledge to quadruple speed cameras, propose funding for up to 400 "walking bus conductors" and look to devolve the powers and resources of the council to more localised groups.

== Council composition ==
=== Prior to the election ===
Birmingham City council has been controlled by the Labour Party since 2012. The Conservative Party last held sole control of the council in 1984. It was under no overall control from 2003 until 2012, run by a Labour-Liberal Democrat coalition from 2003 to 2004 and by a Conservative-Liberal Democrat coalition from 2004 to 2012.

After 2018 election		Before 2022 election	
Party	Seats	Party	Seats
Labour	67	Labour	62
Conservative	25	Conservative	28
Liberal Democrats	8	Liberal Democrats	8
Green	1	Green	1

Changes:

- February 2020: Keith Linnecor (Labour, Oscott) dies; by election held in May 2021, John Clancy (Labour, Quinton) resigns; by-election held in May 2021
- December 2020: Lou Robson (Labour, Hall Green North) resigns; by-election held in May 2021
- March 2021: Lucy Seymour-Smith (Labour, Billesley) resigns; by-election held in May 2021
- May 2021: Labour win by-elections in Billesley and Hall Green North, and Conservatives gain Oscott and Quinton in by-elections
- September 2021: Neil Eustace (Liberal Democrat, Yardley East) dies; by-election held in October 2021
- October 2021: Liberal Democrats win Yardley East by-election
- November 2021: Penny Holbrook (Labour, Stockland Green) dies; seat left vacant until 2022 election
- February 2022: Zhor Malik (Balsall Heath West) joins Conservatives from Labour
- March 2022: Mohammed Fazal (Labour, Sparkhill) dies; seat left vacant until 2022 election

== Summary ==
=== Election result ===
2022 Birmingham City Council election
Party	Seats	Gains	Losses	Net gain/loss	Seats %	Votes %	Votes	+/−
Labour	65	5	7	▼2	64.4	51.5	169,977	+1.3
Conservative	22	2	5	▼3	21.8	27.5	90,650	–1.3
Liberal Democrats	12	4	0	▲4	11.9	14.8	48,939	+0.7
Green	2	1	0	▲1	2.0	5.2	17,072	+0.8
TUSC	0	0	0	0	0.0	0.3	963	±0.0
Independent	0	0	0	0	0.0	0.2	778	–1.8
Workers Party	0	0	0	0	0.0	0.2	566	New
We Matter Party	0	0	0	0	0.0	0.2	506	New
Breakthrough Party	0	0	0	0	0.0	0.1	265	New
Reform	0	0	0	0	0.0	<0.1	93	New

== Ward results ==
Birmingham City Council began publishing ward results on 6 May 2022.

=== Wards beginning A-G ===
==== Acocks Green ====
Acocks Green (2)
Party	Candidate	Votes	%	±%
Liberal Democrats	Roger Harmer *	2,225	51.6	▲11.9
Liberal Democrats	Penny Wagg	1,856	43.0	▲5.9
Labour	John O'Shea *	1,679	38.9	▼9.1
Labour	Ninna Isabel Makrinov	1,531	35.5	▲3.0
Conservative	Malik Zafar Iqbal	288	6.7	▼4.5
Green	Amanda Baker	258	6.0	▲1.7
Conservative	Sunil Shingadia	239	5.5	▼1.5
TUSC	Eamonn Flynn	84	1.9	▲0.4
Majority		177	4.1	
Turnout		4,315	26.99	▼2.23
Registered electors				
Liberal Democrats hold		Swing		
Liberal Democrats gain from Labour		Swing		

==== Allens Cross ====
Allens Cross (1)
Party	Candidate	Votes	%	±%
Labour	Jack Deakin	922	45.9	▲1.3
Conservative	Eddie Freeman	908	45.2	▼1.7
Green	Daniel Brian Rust	112	5.6	▲3.2
Liberal Democrats	Claire Alexandra Fielden	62	3.1	▲0.2
Majority		14	0.7	
Turnout		2,010	27.2	▼1.8
Rejected ballots		7		
Labour gain from Conservative		Swing	▲1.5	

==== Alum Rock ====
Alum Rock (2)
Party	Candidate	Votes	%	±%
Labour	Mohammed Idrees	3,751	78.0	▼7.3
Labour	Mariam Khan	3,442	71.5	▼6.1
Liberal Democrats	Ishraq Hussain	751	15.6	▲10.5
Liberal Democrats	Jerry Evans	501	10.4	▲7.2
Conservative	Wasim Yousaf	177	3.7	Steady
Conservative	Farhat Rani	175	3.6	▼0.1
Majority		2,691	55.9	
Turnout		4,812	30.30	
Labour hold		Swing		
Labour hold		Swing		

==== Aston ====
Aston (2)
Party	Candidate	Votes	%	±%
Liberal Democrats	Ayoub Khan	3,012	51.4	▲15.5
Liberal Democrats	Mumtaz Hussain	2,542	43.4	▲18.7
Labour	Muhammad Afzal	2,463	42.0	▼4.3
Labour	Nagina Kauser	2,223	37.9	▼6.7
Breakthrough Party	Nazma Meah	265	4.5	N/A
Conservative	Jahid Choudhury	216	3.7	▼10.5
Conservative	Lokman Hakim	177	3.0	▼2.2
We Matter Party	Dorothy Gerald	148	2.5	N/A
We Matter Party	Raymond Coke	127	2.2	N/A
Majority		79	1.4	
Turnout		5,858	40	
Liberal Democrats gain from Labour		Swing		
Liberal Democrats gain from Labour		Swing		

==== Balsall Heath West ====
Balsall Heath West (1)
Party	Candidate	Votes	%	±%
Labour	Shehla Moledina	1,150	51.8	▼24.6
Conservative	Zhor Malik	710	32.0	▲26.5
Liberal Democrats	Haleema Khatoon	151	6.8	▼1.2
Green	Carol Guest	121	5.5	▲1.6
Workers Party	Paul Scrivens	88	4.0	▲4.0
Majority		440	19.8	
Turnout		2,220	30	
Labour hold		Swing		

==== Bartley Green ====
Bartley Green (2)
Party	Candidate	Votes	%	±%
Conservative	Bruce Lines	1,814	47.5	▼14.3
Conservative	Kerry Brewer	1,672	43.8	▼18.0
Labour	Elaine Hook	1,624	42.5	▲14.3
Labour	Paul Preston	1,511	39.6	▲9.1
Green	James Robertson	259	6.8	▲2.4
Liberal Democrats	Martin Knowles	151	4.0	▲1.3
Liberal Democrats	Jacob Morrow	132	3.5	▲0.9
Majority		48	1.3	
Turnout		3,820	24	
Conservative hold		Swing		
Conservative hold		Swing		

==== Billesley ====
Billesley (2)
Party	Candidate	Votes	%	±%
Labour	Phil Davis	2,153	52.9	▲2.4
Labour	Katherine Iroh	2,000	49.2	▲3.2
Conservative	Michael McLernan	1,310	32.2	▼8.4
Conservative	Nayaz Qazi	1,261	31.0	▼9.5
Green	Hilary Peacock	392	9.6	▲5.0
Liberal Democrats	Clare Maguire	279	6.9	▲2.5
Green	Joseph Peacock	223	5.5	▲2.7
Liberal Democrats	Ian Neal	183	4.5	▲2.3
Reform	Ian Bishop	93	2.3	N/A
Majority		690	17.0	
Turnout		4,068	28.78	
Labour hold		Swing		
Labour hold		Swing		

==== Birchfield ====
Birchfield (1)
Party	Candidate	Votes	%	±%
Labour	Mahmood Hussain	1,391	78.3	▼5.3
Conservative	Alak Chanda	211	11.9	▲2.4
Liberal Democrats	Christopher Anton	159	9.0	▲2.1
Majority		1,180	66.4	▼7.7
Turnout		1,776	24	▼8.9
Rejected ballots		15		
Labour hold		Swing	▼3.8	

==== Bordesley and Highgate ====
Bordesley and Highgate (1)
Party	Candidate	Votes	%	±%
Labour	Yvonne Mosquito	925	57.3	▼21.2
Conservative	Zia Talukder	311	19.3	▲11.8
Workers Party	Ed Woollard	247	15.3	▲15.3
Green	Martin Guest	132	8.2	▲2.2
Majority		614	38.0	
Turnout		1,615	20	
Labour hold		Swing		

==== Bordesley Green ====
Bordesley Green (1)
Party	Candidate	Votes	%	±%
Labour	Raqeeb Aziz	1,489	67.8	▼1.6
Conservative	Wajad Burkey	397	18.1	▲13.5
Liberal Democrats	Gerry Moynihan	309	14.1	▼8.4
Majority		1,092	49.7	
Turnout		2,195	29.7	
Labour hold		Swing		

==== Bournbrook and Selly Park ====
Bournbrook and Selly Park (2)
Party	Candidate	Votes	%	±%
Labour	Brigid Jones	1,942	65.1	▲3.8
Labour	Karen McCarthy	1,935	64.8	▲7.1
Green	Jane Nelson	546	18.3	▲9.6
Conservative	Musa Nela	301	10.1	▼3.7
Conservative	Tariq Rashid	273	9.1	▼4.3
Liberal Democrats	Patrick Gilbert	243	8.1	▼8.4
Green	Mathew Neville	237	7.9	▲3.9
Liberal Democrats	Robert Curtis	202	6.8	▼6.6
TUSC	Tom Green	142	4.8	▲2.1
Majority		1,389	46.5	
Turnout		2,985	19.9	
Labour hold		Swing		
Labour hold		Swing		

==== Bournville and Cotteridge ====
Bournville and Cotteridge (2)
Party	Candidate	Votes	%	±%
Labour	Liz Clements	3,069	61.2	▲9.9
Labour	Fred Grindrod	2,739	54.6	▲8.9
Conservative	Nigel Dawkins	1,489	29.7	▼8.0
Conservative	Jack Dixon	1,228	24.5	▼10.2
Green	Rob Masters	470	9.4	▲1.9
Liberal Democrats	Phillipa Hentsch	383	7.6	▲2.4
Green	Ben Mabbet	382	7.6	▼1.2
Liberal Democrats	David Radciffe	275	5.5	▲2.0
Majority		1,250	24.9	▲16.9
Turnout			37.21	
Rejected ballots		17		
Labour hold		Swing	▲8.9	
Labour hold		Swing	▲9.6	

==== Brandwood and Kings Heath ====
Brandwood and Kings Heath (2)
Party	Candidate	Votes	%	±%
Labour	David Barker	2,769	50.2	▼8.4
Labour	Lisa Trickett	2,704	49.0	▼10.4
Liberal Democrats	Martin Mullaney	1093	19.8	▲11.4
Conservative	Asia Hussain	968	17.5	▼2.0
Conservative	Harvey Whitby	850	15.4	▲0.9
Liberal Democrats	Chris Stanley	802	14.5	▲9.4
Green	Patrick Cox	615	11.2	▼0.4
Green	Astrid Voight	488	8.9	▲1.28
Independent	Mark Hudson	485	8.8	▲8.8
Workers Party	Lauren Wilson	120	2.2	▲0.5
Workers Party	Phil Bevin	111	2.1	▲0.7
Majority		1,611	29.2	▼9.8
Turnout		5,514	41	
Rejected ballots		24		
Labour hold		Swing	▼9.4	
Labour hold		Swing	▼9.4	

==== Bromford and Hodge Hill ====
Bromford and Hodge Hill (2)
Party	Candidate	Votes	%	±%
Labour	Majid Mahmood	2,434	71.0	▲5.6
Labour	Diane Donaldson	2,405	70.1	▲8.2
Conservative	James Higgs	515	15.0	▼3.3
Conservative	James Zychon	384	11.2	▼4.5
Green	Jack Phillpotts	210	6.1	N/A
Liberal Democrats	James Higgs	155	4.5	▼6.3
Liberal Democrats	Javed Khan	152	4.4	▼2.1
Majority		1,890	55.1	
Turnout		3,429	24.29	
Labour hold		Swing		
Labour hold		Swing		

==== Castle Vale ====
Castle Vale (1)
Party	Candidate	Votes	%	±%
Labour	Ray Goodwin	522	40.5	▼3.9
Green	John Macefield	478	37.1	▲37.1
Conservative	Tyrese Romain	279	21.6	▼29.2
TUSC	Kris Sucilla-O'Sullivan	11	0.9	▼1.5
Majority		44	3.4	
Turnout		1,290	19.4	
Labour gain from Conservative		Swing		

==== Druids Heath and Monyhull ====
Druids Heath and Monyhull (1)
Party	Candidate	Votes	%	±%
Green	Julien Pritchard	1,890	74.5	▲29.1
Labour	Mike Leddy	454	17.9	▼9.5
Conservative	Andrew Fuller	163	6.4	▼19.6
Liberal Democrats	Christopher Bertram	24	0.9	▼0.1
Majority		1,436	66.4	▲48.4
Turnout		2,537	33.1	
Rejected ballots		6		
Green hold		Swing	▲19.3	

==== Edgbaston ====
Edgbaston (2)
Party	Candidate	Votes	%	±%
Conservative	Deirdre Alden	1,710	48.3	▼2.1
Conservative	Matt Bennett	1,548	43.7	▼4.3
Labour	Baljit Kaur Bal	1,474	41.6	▲3.3
Labour	Marie Joann Hill	1,465	41.4	▲5.6
Green	Ashish Awasthi	392	11.1	▲4.3
Liberal Democrats	Jamie Christian Scott	251	7.0	▲0.7
Liberal Democrats	James Liam Bryant	243	6.9	▲1.5
Majority		74	1.0	▼8.7
Turnout		7,083	31.5	
Rejected ballots		26		
Conservative hold		Swing		
Conservative hold		Swing		

==== Erdington ====
Erdington (2)
Party	Candidate	Votes	%	±%
Conservative	Robert Alden	2,469	54.8	▼1.3
Conservative	Gareth Moore	2,047	45.4	▼5.1
Labour	Basharat Dad	1,643	36.5	▼1.3
Labour	Suryiah Bi	1,624	36.0	▲1.7
Green	Hazel Clawley	220	4.9	▼0.4
Green	Andrew Ferguson	161	3.6	N/A
Liberal Democrats	James Green	118	2.6	▼0.1
TUSC	Corinthia Ward	95	2.1	N/A
Liberal Democrats	Mohammed Amin	86	1.9	▼0.7
Majority		404	8.9	
Turnout		4,506	31.67	
Conservative hold		Swing		
Conservative hold		Swing		

==== Frankley Great Park ====
Frankley Great Park (1)
Party	Candidate	Votes	%	±%
Conservative	Simon Morrall	1,356	61.0	▲10.1
Labour	Steve Haynes	711	32.0	▼13.2
Green	Peter Beck	86	3.9	▲3.9
Liberal Democrats	Peter Lloyd	71	3.2	▼0.7
Majority		645	29.0	
Turnout		2,224	27	
Conservative hold		Swing		

==== Garretts Green ====
Garretts Green (1)
Party	Candidate	Votes	%	±%
Labour	Saddak Miah	1,301	67.5	▲17.9
Liberal Democrats	Shaukat Khan	436	22.6	▼20.0
Conservative	Daphne Hall	191	9.9	▲2.1
Majority		865	44.9	
Turnout		1,928	17.7	
Labour hold		Swing		

==== Glebe Farm and Tile Cross ====
Glebe Farm and Tile Cross (2)
Party	Candidate	Votes	%	±%
Labour	Marje Bridle	1,862	63.4	▼4.5
Labour	John Cotton	1,704	58.0	▼4.0
Liberal Democrats	Iftekhar Hussain	567	19.3	▲11.7
Conservative	Matthew Fox	562	19.1	▲3.8
Conservative	Faisal Mahmood	486	16.6	▲3.1
Liberal Democrats	Elizabeth Norman	306	10.4	▲3.2
Majority		1,137	38.7	
Turnout		2,936	19.23	
Labour hold		Swing		
Labour hold		Swing		

==== Gravelly Hill ====
Gravelly Hill (1)
Party	Candidate	Votes	%	±%
Labour	Mick Brown	807	51.8	▼22.4
Green	Siobhan Harper-Nunes	363	23.3	▲23.3
Conservative	Asif Mehmood	328	21.1	▲3.3
Liberal Democrats	David Lusk	34	2.2	▼5.8
TUSC	Thomas Patrick	25	1.6	▲1.6
Majority		444	28.5	
Turnout		1,557	22.65	
Labour hold		Swing		

=== Wards beginning H-R ===
==== Hall Green North ====
Hall Green North (2)
Party	Candidate	Votes	%	±%
Labour	Akhlaq Ahmed	2,271	51.4	▼7.2
Labour	Saima Suleman	2,182	49.4	▼7.9
Conservative	Tanveer Choudhry	1,287	29.1	▲15.6
Conservative	Malik Iqbal	1,134	25.7	▲15.3
Liberal Democrats	Andy Spruce	430	9.7	▲2.1
Liberal Democrats	Alexender Hemming	415	9.4	▲2.6
Green	Gareth Courage	374	8.5	▲1.8
Majority		895	20.3	
Turnout		4,416	28	
Labour hold		Swing		
Labour hold		Swing		

==== Hall Green South ====
Hall Green South (1)
Party	Candidate	Votes	%	±%
Conservative	Tim Huxtable	1,427	51.5	▼8.5
Labour	Shafaq Ahmed	1,071	38.6	▲8.2
Green	David Parker	148	5.3	▲1.0
Liberal Democrats	David Lickiss	118	4.3	▼1.0
Majority		356	12.8	▼17.6
Turnout		2,772	35.2	
Rejected ballots		8		
Conservative hold		Swing	▼8.4	

==== Handsworth ====
Handsworth (1)
Party	Candidate	Votes	%	±%
Labour	Hendrina Quinnen	1,397	82.9	▲11.2
Conservative	Devia Surti	116	6.9	▼12.0
Green	Ed Freshwater	95	5.6	▼0.5
Liberal Democrats	George Michael Okae Fosu	67	4.0	▲0.7
Majority		1,281	76.0	▲23.4
Turnout		1,686	24	
Rejected ballots		11		
Labour hold		Swing	▲11.7	

==== Handsworth Wood ====
Handsworth Wood (2)
Party	Candidate	Votes	%	±%
Labour	Gurdial Atwal	2,318	64.1	▲3.6
Labour	Narinder Kooner	2,237	61.8	▼1.0
Conservative	Ravinder Chumber	723	20.0	▲3.6
Conservative	Sham Uddin	551	15.2	▼1.5
Liberal Democrats	Emily Cox	373	10.3	▲4.4
Liberal Democrats	Christopher Burgess	361	10.0	▲5.2
Majority		1,514	41.8	
Turnout		3,617	26.08	
Labour hold		Swing		
Labour hold		Swing		

==== Harborne ====
Harborne (2)
Party	Candidate	Votes	%	±%
Labour	Martin Brooks	2,923	53.3	▲19.4
Labour	Jayne Francis	2,815	51.3	▲8.4
Conservative	Peter Fowler	1,919	35.0	▼6.5
Conservative	Harriet O'Hara	1,703	31.0	▼8.1
Green	Alistair Crisp	628	11.4	▲0.8
Liberal Democrats	Joseph Harmer	532	9.7	▼1.1
Liberal Democrats	Ian Garrett	455	8.3	▼2.3
Majority				
Turnout			36.24	
Rejected ballots		32		
Labour gain from Conservative		Swing		
Labour hold		Swing		

==== Heartlands ====
Heartlands (1)
Party	Candidate	Votes	%	±%
Labour	Shafique Shah	1,672	79.8	▲0.9
Conservative	Adil Azam	284	13.6	▲9.5
Liberal Democrats	Clair Ellinor	139	6.6	▲0.5
Majority		1,388	66.3	
Turnout		2,095	28	
Labour hold		Swing		

==== Highters Heath ====
Highters Heath (1)
Party	Candidate	Votes	%	±%
Conservative	Adam Higgs	1,094	54.8	▼6.9
Labour	Lynda Waltho	793	39.7	▲7.6
Green	Clare Thomas	109	5.5	▲1.9
Majority		301	15.1	
Turnout		1,996	26.2	
Conservative hold		Swing		

==== Holyhead ====
Holyhead (1)
Party	Candidate	Votes	%	±%
Labour	Rinkal Shergill	1,618	75.9	▲5.5
Independent	Karen Trench	293	13.7	▲13.7 (new)
Conservative	Andrew Hardie	133	6.2	▼12.4
Liberal Democrats	Kingsley Douglas	73	4.5	▼6.5
Majority		1,325	62.2	▲11.1
Turnout		2,131	31	
Rejected ballots		14		
Labour hold		Swing		

==== Kings Norton North ====
Kings Norton North (1)
Party	Candidate	Votes	%	±%
Labour	Alex Aitken	1,353	55.4	▲5.2
Conservative	Barbara Wood	949	38.9	▼7.4
Green	Kari Sorboen	92	3.8	▲3.8
Liberal Democrats	Marsha Blissett	47	1.9	▲1.7
Majority		404	16.6	
Turnout		2,441	32	
Labour hold		Swing		

==== Kings Norton South ====
Kings Norton South (1)
Party	Candidate	Votes	%	±%
Green	Rob Grant	1,137	50.7	▲50.7
Labour	Sonia Kumar	732	32.6	▼18.9
Conservative	Robert Clancy	365	16.3	▼26.5
Majority		405	18.0	▲9.3
Turnout		2,244	28	
Rejected ballots		10		
Green gain from Labour		Swing	▲34.8	

==== Kingstanding ====
Kingstanding (2)
Party	Candidate	Votes	%	±%
Labour	Des Hughes	1,350	46.4	▲2.4
Conservative	Rick Payne	1,286	44.2	▼8.2
Conservative	Ben Brittain	1,274	43.8	▼3.6
Labour	Naz Rasheed	1,221	41.9	▼2.0
Liberal Democrats	Simon Ambler	142	4.9	▲2.0
Green	Richard Painter	125	4.3	N/A
Green	Patricia Taylor	99	3.4	N/A
TUSC	Joe Foster	50	1.7	N/A
We Matter Party	Adam Khan	19	0.7	N/A
Majority		12	0.4	
Turnout		2,912	20.86	
Labour gain from Conservative		Swing		
Conservative hold		Swing		

==== Ladywood ====
Ladywood (2)
Party	Candidate	Votes	%	±%
Labour	Albert Bore	1,819	63.8	▲4.1
Labour	Kath Hartley	1,764	61.9	▲1.9
Conservative	Kenneth Axford	422	14.8	▼3.1
Green	David Gaussen	413	14.5	▲2.0
Conservative	Guy Hordern	358	12.6	▼1.6
Liberal Democrats	Lee Dargue	278	9.8	▼2.6
Liberal Democrats	John Wilson	193	6.8	▼3.4
TUSC	Piriyasha Jeyanayagam	85	3.0	N/A
Majority		1,342	47.1	
Turnout		2,849	17	
Labour hold		Swing		
Labour hold		Swing		

==== Longbridge and West Heath ====
Longbridge and West Heath (2)
Party	Candidate	Votes	%	±%
Conservative	Debbie Clancy	2,138	52.2	▲2.5
Conservative	Ron Storer	1,874	45.8	▲2.1
Labour	Muhamed Abdi	1,366	33.4	▼10.6
Labour	Sanja Kalik	1,340	32.7	▼9.9
Green	Sylvia McKears	294	7.2	▲0.6
Green	Elly Stanton	290	7.1	N/A
Liberal Democrats	Violaine Mendez	180	4.4	▲2.1
Liberal Democrats	Michael Sturt-Joy	160	3.9	▲1.9
TUSC	Clive Walder	94	2.3	N/A
Majority		508	12.4	
Turnout		4,094	26.65	
Conservative hold		Swing		
Conservative gain from Labour		Swing		

==== Lozells ====
Lozells (1)
Party	Candidate	Votes	%	±%
Labour	Waseem Zaffar	1,955	70.7	▲6.2
Conservative	Mohammed Faisal	691	25.0	▲1.8
Green	Kefentse Dennis	118	4.3	▲4.3
Majority		1,264	45.7	
Turnout		2,764	38	
Labour hold		Swing		

==== Moseley ====
Moseley (2)
Party	Candidate	Votes	%	±%
Liberal Democrats	Izzy Knowles	3,025	52.2	▲16.7
Labour	Kerry Jenkins	2,497	43.1	▼7.1
Labour	Martin Straker Welds	2,126	36.7	▼13.3
Liberal Democrats	Radley Russell	1,867	32.2	▲8.2
Green	Edward Porteous	553	9.5	▼0.3
Conservative	Abid Khan	407	7.0	▼2.3
Conservative	Iqrah Khan	363	6.3	▼2.5
Majority		371	6.4	
Turnout		5,794	36.83	
Liberal Democrats gain from Labour		Swing		
Labour hold		Swing		

==== Nechells ====
Nechells (1)
Party	Candidate	Votes	%	±%
Labour	Lee Marsham	1,194	88.1	▲6.9
Conservative	Jamie Babington	150	11.1	▲0.3
Majority		1,042	76.8	▲9.3
Turnout		1,356	18	
Rejected ballots		12		
Labour hold		Swing	▲3.3	

==== Newtown ====
Newtown (1)
Party	Candidate	Votes	%	±%
Labour	Ziaul Islam	1,031	58.1	▼19.3
Conservative	Abdul Khalique	267	15.0	▼3.2
Liberal Democrats	Cabdulqaadir Ruumi	266	15.0	▲10.5
We Matter Party	Desmond Jaddoo	212	11.9	▼6.3
Majority		764	43.0	
Turnout		1,776	23.8	
Labour hold		Swing		

==== Northfield ====
Northfield (1)
Party	Candidate	Votes	%	±%
Labour	Kirsten Kurt-Elli	1,584	56.6	▲3.1
Conservative	Keith Rowe	973	34.7	▼6.4
Green	Trevor Wilson	126	4.5	▲1.8
Liberal Democrats	Andy Moles	118	4.2	▲1.6
Majority		611	21.8	
Turnout		2,801	35.2	
Labour hold		Swing		

==== North Edgbaston ====
North Edgbaston (2)
Party	Candidate	Votes	%	±%
Labour	Marcus Bernasconi	2,353	65.7	▼4.8
Labour	Sharon Thompson	2,178	60.8	▲2.0
Conservative	Kamran Choudary	1,043	29.1	▼1.9
Conservative	Wasim Zaman	1,003	28.0	▲4.6
Liberal Democrats	Michael Ward	274	7.6	▲1.7
Liberal Democrats	Timon Burford	208	5.8	▲1.4
TUSC	William Downs	108	3.0	▲3.0 (new party)
Majority		1,135		
Turnout		7,167	27.29	
Rejected ballots		32		
Labour hold		Swing		
Labour hold		Swing		

==== Oscott ====
Oscott (2)
Party	Candidate	Votes	%	±%
Conservative	Darius Sandhu	1,506	45.3	▲5.6
Labour	Barbara Dring	1,502	45.2	▼3.0
Conservative	Alex Hall	1,477	44.4	▲9.2
Labour	Haleem Majahid	1,204	36.2	▼14.5
Liberal Democrats	Josh Bunting	313	9.4	▲5.2
Liberal Democrats	Nora Warnaby	224	6.7	▲3.0
Majority		25	0.8	
Turnout		3,326	23.17	
Conservative gain from Labour		Swing		
Labour hold		Swing		

==== Perry Barr ====
Perry Barr (2)
Party	Candidate	Votes	%	±%
Liberal Democrats	Jon Hunt	2,286	54.3	▼3.8
Liberal Democrats	Morriam Jan	1,841	43.8	▼3.3
Labour	Mohammed Hanif	1,673	39.8	▲2.7
Labour	Fiona Williams	1,324	31.5	▼1.1
Conservative	Jahangir Ahmed	348	8.3	▲1.2
Conservative	William Jenkins	291	6.9	▲3.2
Majority		168	4.0	
Turnout		4,207	29.58	
Liberal Democrats hold		Swing		
Liberal Democrats hold		Swing		

==== Perry Common ====
Perry Common (1)
Party	Candidate	Votes	%	±%
Labour	Jillian Bermingham	892	52.7	▲6.0
Conservative	Rachel Okello	684	40.4	▼8.8
Liberal Democrats	Stephen Allsop	52	3.1	▼1.0
Green	Stephanie Boyle	45	2.7	▲2.7
TUSC	Siobhan Friel	21	1.2	▲1.2
Majority		208	12.3	
Turnout		1,694	22.01	
Labour gain from Conservative		Swing		

==== Pype Hayes ====
Pype Hayes (1)
Party	Candidate	Votes	%	±%
Labour	Basharat Mahmood	911	47.7	▲1.8
Conservative	Clifton Welch	819	42.9	▼2.2
Green	Robert Deamer	105	5.5	▲2.4
Liberal Democrats	Gerald Watts	45	2.4	▼3.5
TUSC	Bill Murray	28	1.5	▲1.5
Majority		92	4.8	
Turnout		1,908	25.7	
Labour hold		Swing		

==== Quinton ====
Quinton (2)
Party	Candidate	Votes	%	±%
Labour	Sam Forsyth	2,249	45.9	▲0.2
Labour	Lauren Rainbow	2,163	44.2	▼1.0
Conservative	Dominic Stanford	2,136	43.6	▲0.3
Conservative	Connor McCormack	2,064	42.1	▲4.5
Green	James Bolton	292	6.0	▼0.7
Liberal Democrats	Sue Anderson	222	4.5	▼2.3
Liberal Democrats	Stephanie Garrett	192	3.9	▲1.0
Majority		27	0.6	
Turnout		4,897	32.83	
Labour hold		Swing		
Labour hold		Swing		

==== Rubery and Rednal ====
Rubery and Rednal (1)
Party	Candidate	Votes	%	±%
Conservative	Adrian Delaney	918	49.3	▼4.1
Labour	Tony Kennedy	776	41.7	▲2.8
Green	Robert Ball	117	6.3	▲1.4
Liberal Democrats	Thomas Lister	50	2.7	▼0.2
Majority		142	7.6	
Turnout		1,861	26.15	
Conservative hold		Swing		

=== Wards beginning S-Y ===
==== Shard End ====
Shard End (1)
Party	Candidate	Votes	%	±%
Labour	Ian Ward	854	60.4	▼0.4
Conservative	Tony Briggs	371	26.2	▲1.4
Green	Eve Alsopp	100	7.1	▲3.0
Liberal Democrats	Christopher Barber	80	5.7	▲1.3
Majority		483	34.2	▼1.7
Rejected ballots		9		
Turnout		1,414	16.8	
Labour hold		Swing	▼0.9	

==== Sheldon ====
Sheldon (2)
Party	Candidate	Votes	%	±%
Liberal Democrats	Paul Tilsley	1,752	56.0	▼6.2
Liberal Democrats	Colin Green	1,534	49.0	▼7.8
Labour	Isra Abdi	835	26.7	▲4.9
Labour	Joseph Piekarz	743	23.7	▲2.4
Conservative	Susan Axford	564	18.0	▲6.5
Conservative	Oliver Jenkins	513	16.4	▲5.4
Green	Kevin Harrison	218	7.0	▲3.8
TUSC	Mark Andrews	89	2.8	▲2.8
Majority		699	22.3	▼
Rejected ballots		14		
Turnout			24.1	
Liberal Democrats hold		Swing	▼	

==== Small Heath ====
Small Heath (2)
Party	Candidate	Votes	%	±%
Labour	Shabina Bano	2,142	44.5	▼10.9
Labour	Saqib Khan	2,005	41.7	▼12.5
Liberal Democrats	Mohammed Saeed	1,406	29.2	▼0.3
Liberal Democrats	Naveed Sadiq	1,290	26.8	▲9.6
Conservative	Nowshed Abu	1,081	22.5	▲11.4
Conservative	Aftab Hussain	800	16.6	▲7.3
Majority		599	12.5	
Turnout		4,809	36	
Labour hold		Swing		
Labour hold		Swing		

==== Soho and Jewellery Quarter ====
Soho and Jewellery Quarter (2)
Party	Candidate	Votes	%	±%
Labour	Chaman Lal	2,399	69.4	▲7.2
Labour	Sybil Spence	2,146	62.1	▲7.0
Green	Mette Christoffersen	473	13.7	▲6.6
Conservative	Janet Coffey	391	11.3	▼5.6
Conservative	Ali Hashmi	305	8.8	▼3.3
Liberal Democrats	Gareth Hardy	300	8.7	▼6.2
Liberal Democrats	James Perrott	242	7.0	▼2.8
Majority		1,673	48.4	
Turnout		3,455	22.6	
Labour hold		Swing		
Labour hold		Swing		

==== South Yardley ====
South Yardley (1)
Party	Candidate	Votes	%	±%
Liberal Democrats	Zaker Choudhry	1,062	55.3	▼5.1
Labour	Anser Bashir	515	26.8	▲2.7
Conservative	Julia Mackie	220	11.5	▼2.5
Green	Christopher Garghan	90	4.7	▲3.0
TUSC	Bob Severn	20	1.0	▲1.0
Majority		547	28.5	▼7.8
Turnout		1,920	27	
Rejected ballots		13		
Liberal Democrats hold		Swing	▼3.9	

==== Sparkbrook and Balsall Heath East ====
Sparkbrook and Balsall Heath East (2)
Party	Candidate	Votes	%	±%
Labour	Mohammed Azim	2,708	68.8	▼8.4
Labour	Shabrana Hussain	2,417	61.4	▼10.2
Conservative	Abdul Bari	937	23.8	▲11.1
Conservative	Md Kabir	776	19.7	▲7.6
Green	Michael Harrison	186	4.7	▲0.4
Liberal Democrats	Paul Bishop	173	4.4	▲0.8
Liberal Democrats	Maddison Crickmay	131	3.3	▲0.4
Majority		1,470	37.6	
Turnout		3,935	25.18	
Labour hold		Swing		
Labour hold		Swing		

==== Sparkhill ====
Sparkhill (2)
Party	Candidate	Votes	%	±%
Labour	Rashad Mahmood	3,020	74.2	▲12.6
Labour	Nicky Brennan	2,889	71.0	▲12.7
Conservative	Habib Rehman	739	18.2	▲8.3
Conservative	Aneela Asad	537	13.2	▲4.6
Liberal Democrats	Aysan Al-Haq	261	6.4	▼19.0
Liberal Democrats	Anthony Wilkinson	166	4.1	▼19.0
Majority		2,150	52.8	
Turnout		4,069	30.52	
Labour hold		Swing		
Labour hold		Swing		

==== Stirchley ====
Stirchley (1)
Party	Candidate	Votes	%	±%
Labour	Mary Locke	1,900	72.7	▲5.9
Conservative	Graham Knight	361	13.8	▼6.9
Green	Eleanor Masters	229	8.8	▲3.2
Liberal Democrats	Philip Banting	125	4.8	▼0.3
Majority		1,539	58.9	
Turnout		2,615	36	
Labour hold		Swing		

==== Stockland Green ====
Stockland Green (2)
Party	Candidate	Votes	%	±%
Labour	Jane Jones	2,040	61.4	▼6.6
Labour	Amar Khan	1,871	56.4	▼4.2
Conservative	Estelle Murphy	757	22.8	▲4.4
Conservative	Mohammad Kayani	753	22.7	▲3.2
Green	Roxanne Green	183	5.5	N/A
Green	Janet Assheton	177	5.3	N/A
Liberal Democrats	Charlie Moore	159	4.8	▼1.4
TUSC	Ted Woodley	111	3.3	▼0.1
Liberal Democrats	Joe Norris	81	2.4	▼1.6
Majority		1,114	33.6	
Turnout		3,320	22.4	
Labour hold		Swing		
Labour hold		Swing		

==== Sutton Four Oaks ====
Sutton Four Oaks (1)
Party	Candidate	Votes	%	±%
Conservative	Maureen Cornish	1,658	65.6	▼11.5
Labour	Roger Barley	452	17.9	▲4.5
Liberal Democrats	David Willett	246	9.7	▲4.1
Green	Linda Hudson	151	6.0	▲2.1
Majority		1,206	47.7	▼16.0
Turnout		2,529	33	
Rejected ballots		22		
Conservative hold		Swing	▼8.0	

==== Sutton Mere Green ====
Sutton Mere Green (1)
Party	Candidate	Votes	%	±%
Conservative	Meirion Jenkins	1,717	64.0	▼7.8
Labour	Max Mackenzie	573	21.4	▲5.3
Liberal Democrats	Regine Wilber	241	9.0	▲2.2
Green	Anne Okole	151	5.6	▲0.3
Majority		1,144	42.7	
Turnout		2,682	34	
Conservative hold		Swing		

==== Sutton Reddicap ====
Sutton Reddicap (1)
Party	Candidate	Votes	%	±%
Conservative	Richard Parkin	1,172	61.0	▲4.3
Labour	Judy Preston	557	29.0	▼1.2
Green	Ben Auton	193	10.0	▲10.0
Majority		615	32.0	
Turnout		1,922	26.5	
Conservative hold		Swing		

==== Sutton Roughley ====
Sutton Roughley (1)
Party	Candidate	Votes	%	±%
Conservative	Ewan Mackey	1,620	61.9	▼5.5
Labour	Pat Mika	736	28.1	▲8.7
Liberal Democrats	Brandon Masih	239	9.1	▲1.1
Majority		884	33.8	▼14.2
Turnout		2,619	31.3	
Rejected ballots		24		
Conservative hold		Swing	▼7.1	

==== Sutton Trinity ====
Sutton Trinity (1)
Party	Candidate	Votes	%	±%
Conservative	David Pears	1,154	48.0	▼9.1
Labour	Peter Quinn	773	32.2	▲7.2
Green	Rachel McCollin	266	11.1	▲5.9
Liberal Democrats	Jenny Wilkinson	210	8.7	▼3.9
Majority		381	15.9	
Turnout		2,403	32	
Conservative hold		Swing		

==== Sutton Vesey ====
Sutton Vesey (2)
Party	Candidate	Votes	%	±%
Labour	Rob Pocock	3,335	63.8	▲6.8
Labour	Kath Scott	2,748	52.6	▲11.1
Conservative	Jan Cairns	1,880	36.0	▼3.7
Conservative	Frank Eperjesi	1,519	29.1	▼7.7
Liberal Democrats	Mark Lewis	331	6.3	▲1.7
Liberal Democrats	Paul Richardson	246	4.7	▲2.8
Majority		868	16.6	
Turnout		5,228	34.85	
Labour hold		Swing		
Labour hold		Swing		

==== Sutton Walmley and Minworth ====
Sutton Walmley and Minworth (2)
Party	Candidate	Votes	%	±%
Conservative	David Barrie	2,223	62.2	▼2.8
Conservative	Ken Wood	1,862	52.1	▲2.4
Labour	Joseph Blenkinsop	770	21.5	▲3.0
Labour	Ruth Wilde	656	18.3	▲3.1
Liberal Democrats	David Cooke	415	11.6	▲5.3
Green	Colin Marriott	384	10.7	▲1.8
Liberal Democrats	James Garrington	382	10.7	▲5.9
Majority		1,092	30.6	
Turnout		3,576	28.3	
Conservative hold		Swing		
Conservative hold		Swing		

==== Sutton Wylde Green ====
Sutton Wylde Green (1)
Party	Candidate	Votes	%	±%
Conservative	Alex Yip	1,489	57.2	▼8.0
Labour	Terry Johnson	630	24.2	▲1.0
Liberal Democrats	Malcolm Spencer	296	11.4	▲5.5
Green	Zoe Challenor	172	6.6	▲1.5
Majority		859	33.0	▼8.9
Turnout		2,604		
Rejected ballots		17		
Conservative hold		Swing	▼4.5	

==== Tyseley and Hay Mills ====
Tyseley and Hay Mills (1)
Party	Candidate	Votes	%	±%
Labour	Zafar Iqbal	1,332	74.5	▲7.9
Liberal Democrats	Sajad Amjad	184	10.3	▼4.7
Conservative	Najma Begum	155	8.7	▼1.5
Green	Joanna Hindley	118	6.6	▲6.6
Majority		1,148	64.2	
Turnout		1,789	23.8	
Labour hold		Swing		

==== Ward End ====
Ward End (1)
Party	Candidate	Votes	%	±%
Labour	Bushra Bi	1,186	43.7	▼10.5
Liberal Democrats	Naz Ali	938	34.5	▲4.9
Conservative	Hassan Ali	457	16.8	▲11.4
Green	Imran Khan	136	5.0	▲5.0
Majority		248	9.1	
Turnout		2,717	33.1	
Labour hold		Swing		

==== Weoley & Selly Oak ====
Weoley & Selly Oak (2)
Party	Candidate	Votes	%	±%
Labour	Miranda Perks	2,427	53.6	▲9.7
Labour	Jamie Tennant	2,254	49.8	▲6.8
Conservative	Claire Smith	1628	35.9	▼3.9
Conservative	Paul Smith	1549	34.2	▼5.4
Green	Kirsty Axe	326	7.2	▼1.5
Green	Claire Hammond	324	7.2	▲7.2 (new)
Liberal Democrats	Luke Ellinor	289	6.4	▼0.5
Liberal Democrats	Philip Mills	246	5.4	▲0.3
Majority		626	13.8	▲10.6
Turnout		4530	29.75	▼
Rejected ballots		17		
Labour hold		Swing	▲6.8	
Labour hold		Swing	▲6.1	

==== Yardley East ====
Yardley East (1)
Party	Candidate	Votes	%	±%
Liberal Democrats	Deborah Harries	1,220	58.7	▼6.2
Labour	Fayaz Khuhro	675	32.5	▲2.3
Conservative	Ben Broadley	174	8.4	▲3.5
Majority		545	26.2	▼8.4
Turnout		2,079	26	
Rejected ballots		10		
Liberal Democrats hold		Swing	▼4.2	

==== Yardley West and Stechford ====
Yardley West and Stechford (1)
Party	Candidate	Votes	%	±%
Liberal Democrats	Baber Baz	1,994	70.7	▲19.2
Labour	Yvette John	717	25.4	▼18.5
Conservative	Monica Hardie	98	3.5	▼1.1
Majority		1,277	45.4	▲37.7
Turnout		2,821	37	
Rejected ballots		12		
Liberal Democrats hold		Swing	▲18.8	

== Changes between 2022 and 2026 ==
- In December 2023, Simon Morrall had the Conservative whip withdrawn and subsequently sat as an independent.
- In May 2024, Ayoub Khan left the Liberal Democrats to sit as an independent.
- In September 2024, Shabina Bano left Labour and joined the Liberal Democrats.
- In December 2024, Martin Brooks left Labour to sit as an independent.
- In April 2025, Sam Forsyth left Labour to sit as an independent.
- In August 2025, Barbara Dring and Jane Jones left Labour to sit as independents.
- In October 2025, Amar Khan, Mohammed Idrees, Chaman Lal and Rinkal Shergill left Labour to sit as independents.
- In December 2025, Jack Deakin resigned as a Labour councillor for Allens Cross; the seat remained vacant until the 2026 election.
- In January 2026, Ziaul Islam left Labour to sit as an independent.
- In January 2026, Labour councillor Waseem Zaffar died; the Lozells seat remained vacant until the 2026 election.
- In April 2026, Hendrina Quinnen left Labour to sit as an independent.

=== By-elections ===
==== Sparkbrook and Balsall Heath East ====
The Sparkbrook and Balsall Heath East by-election was triggered by the death of Labour councillor Mohammed Azim.

Sparkbrook and Balsall Heath East: 6 October 2022
Party	Candidate	Votes	%	±%
Labour	Saima Ahmed	2,410	69.6	+5.3
Liberal Democrats	Shaukat Ali Khan	517	14.9	+11.3
Conservative	Zhor Malik	305	8.8	−14.2
Workers Party	Phil Bevin	158	4.6	N/A
Green	Michael Harrison	72	2.1	−2.4
Majority		1,893	54.7	+17.1
Rejected ballots		42		
Turnout		3,504	22.1	−3.1
Labour hold		Swing	▼3.0	

==== Bournbrook and Selly Park ====
The Bournbrook and Selly Park by-election was triggered by the resignation of Labour councillor Brigid Jones.

Bournbrook and Selly Park by-election, 2 May 2024
Party	Candidate	Votes	%	±%
Labour	Jamie Christopher Scott	1,346	39	–26.1
Green	Carla Charles	585	17	–1.3
Conservative	Andrew David Hardie	457	13.2	+3.1
Liberal Democrats	Joe Norris	435	12.6	+4.5
Independent	Peter Bloomer	405	11.7	+11.7
Workers Party	Ed Woollard	138	4	+4
Socialist Alternative	Corinthia Ward	86	2.5	+2.5
Majority		761	22	–24.5
Rejected ballots		39		
Turnout		3,491	23.5	+3.6
Labour hold		Swing	–12.4	

==== Kingstanding ====
The Kingstanding by-election was triggered by the resignation of Conservative councillor Rick Payne.

Kingstanding: 30 May 2024
Party	Candidate	Votes	%	±%
Conservative	Clifton Welch	829	47.9	+4.6
Labour	Naz Rashid	680	39.3	–6.1
Liberal Democrats	Lucy Hayward	82	4.7	–0.1
Green	Patrick Lee	72	4.2	±0.0
Workers Party	Pete Higgins	46	2.7	N/A
TUSC	Kris O’Sullivan	20	1.2	–0.5
Majority		149	8.6	N/A
Rejected ballots		10		
Turnout		1,739		
Conservative hold		Swing	▲5.4	

==== Kings Norton North ====
The Kings Norton North by-election was triggered by the resignation of Labour councillor Alex Aitken.

Kings Norton North: 4 July 2024
Party	Candidate	Votes	%	±%
Labour	Carmel Gertrude Corrigan	1,638	40.6	–14.8
Conservative	Daniel Molloy-Brookes	1,576	39.0	+0.1
Green	Claire Marie Hammond	490	12.1	+8.3
Liberal Democrats	Alex Hemming	335	8.3	+6.4
Majority		62	1.6	−15.0
Rejected ballots		74		
Turnout		4,113		
Labour hold		Swing	▼7.5	

==== Northfield ====
The Northfield by-election was triggered by the resignation of Labour councillor Kirsten Kurt-Elli.

Northfield: 4 July 2024
Party	Candidate	Votes	%	±%
Labour	Esther Rai	1,882	40.5	–16.1
Conservative	Abigail Smith	1,739	37.5	+2.8
Green	Laura Jane Griffiths	555	12.0	+7.5
Liberal Democrats	Andrew Moles	467	10.1	+5.9
Majority		143	3.0	−18.8
Rejected ballots		74		
Turnout		4,717		
Labour hold		Swing	▼9.5	

==== Moseley ====
The Moseley by-election was triggered by the death of Labour councillor Kerry Jenkins.

Moseley by-election: 23 October 2025
Party	Candidate	Votes	%	±%
Liberal Democrats	Philip Mills	1,634	34.7	▼7.5
Labour	Stephen Pihlaja	1,149	24.4	▼15.5
Independent	Carol Williams	923	19.6	N/A
Green	Catherine Turner	474	10.1	▲0.6
Reform	Aysan al-Haq	345	7.3	N/A
Conservative	Nayaz Qazi	111	2.4	▼4.3
Independent	Danny Mazhar (Note: Standing under the description Birmingham Community Independents.)	80	1.7	N/A
Majority		485	10.3	▲3.9
Rejected ballots		22		
Turnout		4,738	29.9	▼6.9
Liberal Democrats gain from Labour		Swing	▲5.5	
