= Plantsbrook Local Nature Reserve =

Nature reserve in the West Midlands, England

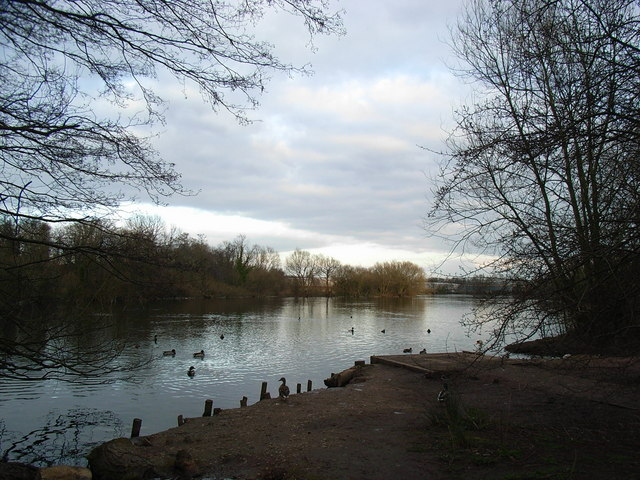
- Interactive map of Plantsbrook Local Nature Reserve
- Type: Local Nature Reserve
- Location: Birmingham, England
- Coordinates: 52.5277°N 1.7961°W
- Created: 20 March 1991
- Operator: Birmingham City Council
- Website: birmingham.gov.uk/plantsbrook

Plantsbrook Local Nature Reserve is a nature reserve on the Plants Brook in The Royal Town of Sutton Coldfield, near Birmingham, England, consisting of open water, wetland, woodland and meadow. It is located on Eachelhurst Road, on the border of the Pype Hayes and Walmley districts. It was designated a Local Nature Reserve in 1991.

The reserve, managed by Birmingham City Council, measures 10.72 hectares (26.5 acres) and is used as an educational resource.
