= New Town Hall =

New Town Hall or New City Hall may refer to:

- Michael Fowler Centre, originally known as the New Town Hall
- New Town Hall, Brading
- New Town Hall (Bremen)
- New Town Hall (Dresden)
- New Town Hall (Hanover)
- New Town Hall (Leipzig)
- New Town Hall (Munich)
- New City Hall (Ostrava)
- New Town Hall (Prague)
- New Town Hall, Wiesbaden
- Red Town Hall (Szczecin), also known as the New Town Hall
- Toronto City Hall, also known as the New City Hall
