= New Hall Manor =

Grade I listed hotel in Sutton Coldfield, United Kingdom

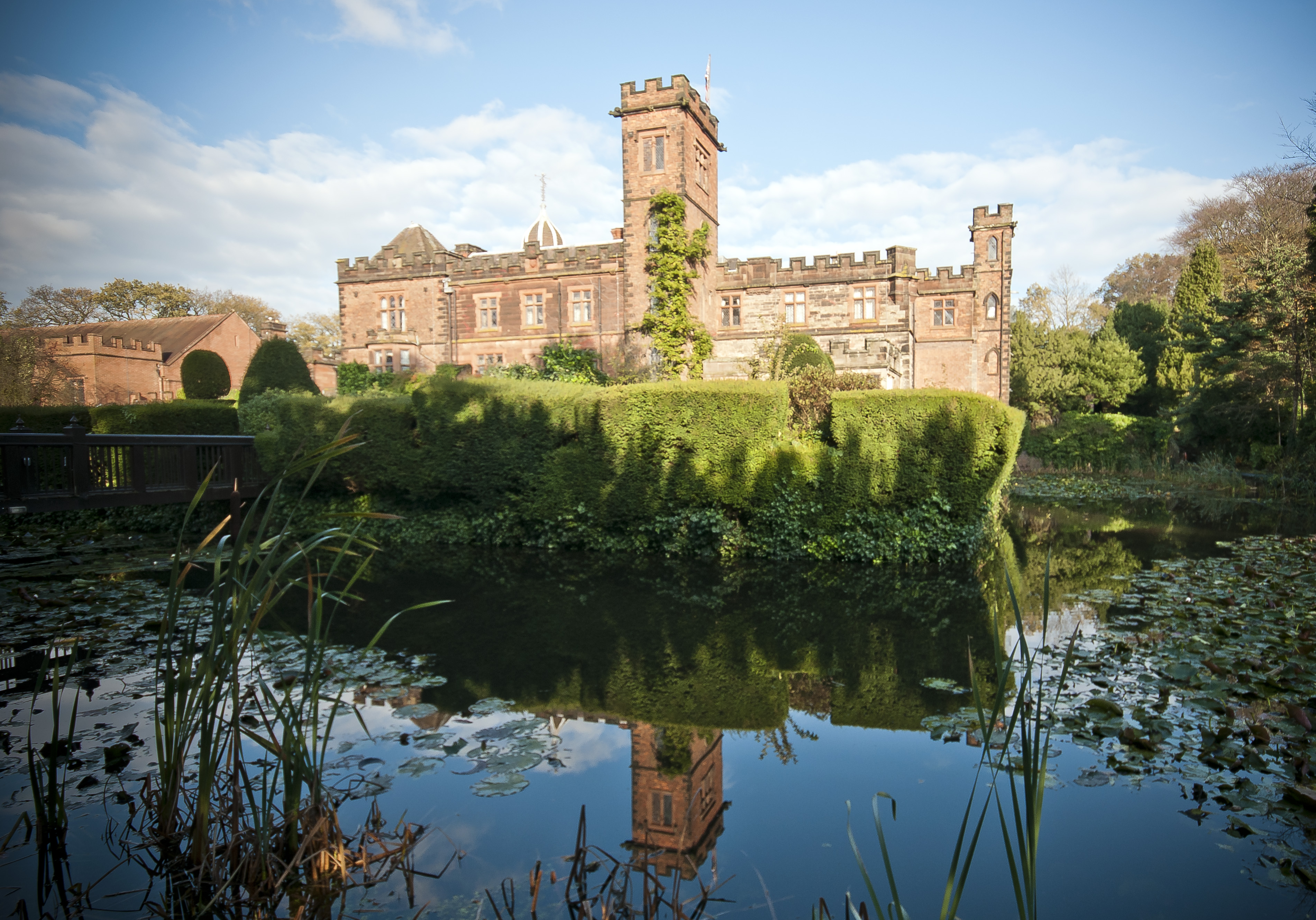

- Location within West Midlands county

General information
- Location: Sutton Coldfield, West Midlands, England
- Coordinates: 52.550973°N 1.804566°W
- Construction started: 13th century
- Completed: 19th century

New Hall Manor is a medieval manor house, now used as a hotel, in Sutton Coldfield, West Midlands, England.

It is claimed to be one of the oldest inhabited moated houses in Britain, dating from the 13th century when the Earl of Warwick built a hunting lodge on the site. The first reference to the site as a manor is from 1435 when it appeared in a legal document after Sir Richard Stanhope's death, who held it on behalf if of the Earl of Warwick. The core of the present building, including the great hall, dates from the 16th century when the Gibbons family (relatives of Bishop Vesey) were in residence. Thomas Gibbons is said to have bought New Hall in 1552. Later owners included the Sacheverells, who received it from Thomas and Edward Giddons, and the Chadwicks, who were bequeathed it from George Sacheverell. In 1739, the Sacheverells mortgaged the New Hall estate to Francis Horton of Wolverhampton.

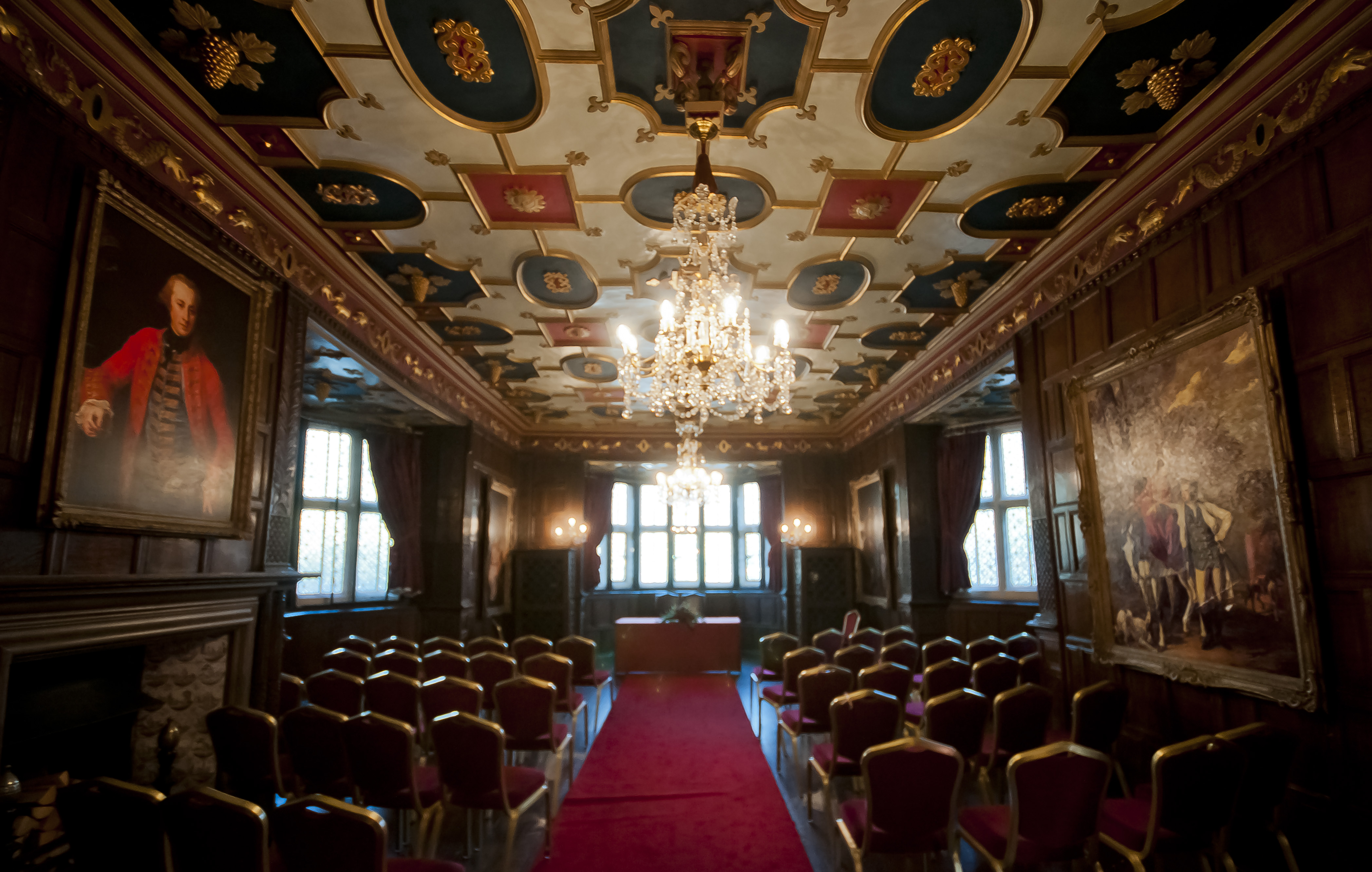
The Great Chamber

The buildings served briefly as a school from 1885; Lt. Col. Wilkinson restored the Hall to residential use in 1903. In 1923 it was acquired by Alfred Owen of Rubery Owen and remained the Owen family home until the 1970s. It was converted to a hotel in 1988 by Ian Hannah and Ken Arkley, of Thistle Hotels. It is now owned and operated by Hand Picked Hotels.

The house gives its name to Sutton New Hall ward, New Hall Valley and the New Hall Valley Country Park situated inside it, along with the New Hall Estate and New Hall Manor Estate, both of which were are residential developments constructed on New Hall Farm.

Plants Brook used to drive New Hall Mill before being channelled away from the mill.

The building is Grade I listed, with other Grade II structures.

Bon Jovi's music video for "I'll Sleep When I'm Dead" was filmed at New Hall Manor in 1993.

The exteriors of the building were additionally briefly used during the third season of TV show Killing Eve in 2020
