= Plants Brook =

Watercourse in Birmingham, England

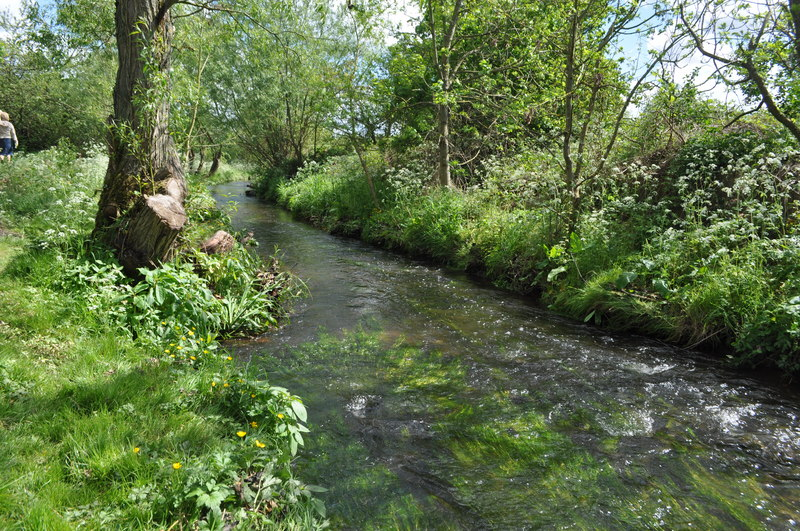

Plants Brook (originally Ebrook, Ebrooke or East Brook) is a stream in Erdington and Sutton Coldfield, Birmingham, England. It is a tributary of the River Tame, whose waters ultimately flow, via the River Trent and the Humber, into the North Sea.

== Course of the stream ==
The source is in the Streetly area of Sutton Park where it flows as a small trickle to Blackroot Pool in Sutton Park, which has been formed as a result of the damming of the stream. It then flows south east to Cross Pool near Wyndley Leisure Centre, where it is joined by the Longmoor Brook. Water is channelled from this pool towards Wyndley Leisure Centre where there was a now-demolished water mill. The stream then goes under ground below Clifton Road and Sutton Coldfield town centre before resurfacing along Queen Street on the edge of the town centre. Here it is channelled to follow the edge of the road before flowing beneath it at a bend where it flows from north east to south east. It continues flowing in this direction, past Plantsbrook School, which receives its name from the stream, and turns north east at Sutton Coldfield Town F.C.'s football ground, underneath Ebrook Road, named after the former name of the stream. It meanders through a housing estate and underneath a railway viaduct and enters New Hall Valley Country Park from its north.

From here it is channelled southwards past the New Hall Estate, New Hall Manor and New Hall mill. Prior to it being channelled, it flowed alongside New Hall Manor to New Hall Mill, where it powered the machinery. The stream is split into two streams, parallel to each other as it approaches Wylde Green Road. Up until 1967, the Wylde Green Road was crossed by a ford formed by Plants Brook. Alongside this, John Vesey, Bishop of Exeter, constructed one of his 51 cottages known as the Fordkeeper's House. This provided security to those travelling along the Wylde Green Road.

It continues to flow south through the country park in New Hall Valley, and underneath Penns Bridge. It flows to the east of Walmley Golf Club and provides water to Penns Lake, a long pool at Penns Hall. This southwards pattern is gradually lost as it flows around the boundary of Pypes Hayes Golf Course. Here it begins to flow south east, and once it reaches Eachelhurst Road, it is flowing east.

A bridge was built over the stream at Eachelhurst Road and a parting in a housing estate indicates the course of the stream, despite being underground. It resurfaces soon after into several small pools, which were formerly reservoirs, The reservoirs still provide water to the Birmingham and Fazeley Canal. The area was designated nature reserve status in March 1991, as Plantsbrook Local Nature Reserve, and covers an area of 24.96 acres (101,000 m^{2}). From there, the brook is culverted southwards, emerging just before its confluence with the Tame.

== History ==
The course of the river has changed very little during its known history. When Sutton Coldfield was a separate district to Birmingham, it provided a major source of water for the residents.

To the affluent members of society living in Sutton Coldfield, it was contested over. Landowners were very restrictive in letting others use the stream. One such person was William Beauchamp, Earl of Warwick. However, in 1288, he allowed Thomas de Arden, owner of Peddimore Hall, to fish in the stream on Beauchamp's land.

A survey of the stream was conducted by the Applied Hydrobiology Section of Aston University in 1972, into the wildlife of the stream. The results showed that it was relatively unpolluted and was well aerated. The soft acid waters supported various species such as crayfish, nymphs, stoneflies, mayflies and fresh water shrimps. Minnows were also found to be living in the stretch of water between Blackroot Pool and Town Gate.

== Features on the course ==
Point	Coordinates
Blackroot Pool	52.5726°N 1.8428°W
Cross Pool, near Wyndley	52.5631°N 1.8313°W
Queen Street	52.5605°N 1.8229°W
Ebrook Road bridge	52.5572°N 1.8166°W
New Hall Valley Country Park	52.5566°N 1.8135°W
Fordkeeper's Cottage	52.5473°N 1.8082°W
Penns Bridge	52.5422°N 1.8076°W
Penns Lake	52.5392°N 1.8089°W
Pype Hayes Golf Course	52.5323°N 1.8055°W
Plantsbrook Local Nature Reserve	52.5277°N 1.7961°W
Confluence with River Tame	52.5146°N 1.7777°W
