= Minworth =

Coordinates: 52°31′37″N 1°46′04″W

- Village
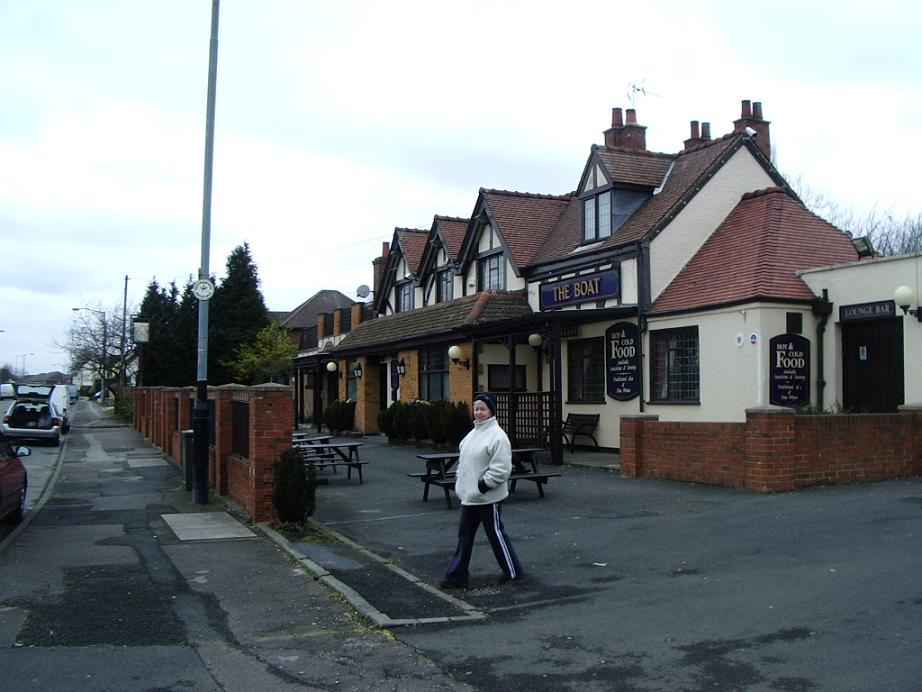
- The Boat

- Location within the West Midlands
- Demonym: Minworthian
- OS grid reference: SP 15850 92138
- Civil parish: Sutton Coldfield
- Metropolitan borough: Birmingham
- Metropolitan county: West Midlands
- Region: West Midlands
- Country: England
- Sovereign state: United Kingdom
- Post town: SUTTON COLDFIELD
- Postcode district: B76
- Dialling code: 0121
- Police: West Midlands
- Fire: West Midlands
- Ambulance: West Midlands
- UK Parliament: Sutton Coldfield

Minworth is a village situated in the civil parish of Sutton Coldfield, West Midlands, Minworth consists of three hamlets Wiggins Hill, Peddimore and The Greaves and the Hurst Green estate. Minworth lies within the City of Birmingham district on its northeastern outer fringe, where it forms part of the Sutton Walmley and Minworth electoral ward and borders the North Warwickshire district, some 4.5 miles southeast of Sutton Coldfield town centre.

Minworth is the centre of England and Wales. The exact centre point is at the grid reference; SP 15322 93007.

The village is immediately adjacent to the housing estate of Castle Vale, the Sutton suburb of Walmley and the Warwickshire village of Curdworth. The River Tame runs through the south of the area. Minworth has close transport links to the M6, M6 Toll and M42 motorways, while the closest rail station is nearby Water Orton railway station in Water Orton, Warwickshire.

== History ==
Minworth's name probably came from Mynna's Estate. Minworth and Curdworth both originated in the 6th or 7th centuries, being established by Angle settlers, and are historically associated with the Arden family (William Shakespeare's maternal relations). Peddimore Hall is a double-moated farmstead and can be associated with the Ardens from 1298 until 1659. The present farmhouse can be dated to the 16th century.

Minworth was originally a hamlet in the parish of Curdworth in the hundred of Hemlingford. In 1866 Minworth became a separate civil parish, Minworth became part of the Castle Bromwich Rural District of Warwickshire from 1894 to 1912, then becoming part of the Meriden Rural District. On 1 April 1931 the parish was abolished, with the populated parts being split between Sutton Coldfield and Birmingham and an area of unpopulated land going to Castle Bromwich parish. In 1921 the parish had a population of 977.

When excavations were undertaken for Minworth sewage works, evidence of the Pleistocene period was found here, including the fossilised bones of a mammoth which walked this way one million years ago.

In Minworth's North Fields, a scatter of Mesolithic flints was found dating from around 6000 BC. These were mainly small cutting tools or waste from flint tool production here on a site that would have been the temporary hunting settlement of a small tribe of nomadic Stone Age people, stretching from north Wishaw to North Minworth.

There was still a settlement in the Minworth during the Bronze Age, though its exact location is unknown. A burnt mound has been investigated on Hurst Brook south of Wishaw Lane. One of over two dozen in the Birmingham area, their precise purpose can only be guessed. The mound is formed from a collection of heat-shattered stones which must have taken many years to accumulate, suggesting a long period of settlement. It is thought that they may represent some form of sauna, and possibly served a religious function, but solid evidence is not forthcoming.

A 5000-year-old axe from the Neolithic age was found in Minworth near the sewage works.

Off of Wiggins Hill Road many scattered pieces of Roman pottery have been discovered. Broken pottery was usually thrown onto the farm's dung heap and later scattered onto the fields with the manure; clear evidence that a settlement was not far from the present Hamlet of Wiggins Hill. And in a small urn buried in the ground was found a Roman coin hoard. This included coins of the emperors Gallienus (253-268), Victorinus (269-271), Tetricus (271-273), Claudius II Gothicus (268-270). Why the coins were buried here sometime after 270 AD and why they were never collected remains an open question.

Minworth was documented in the Domesday Book as Meneworde from the Old English Mynna's worth, 'Mynna's farmstead or Mynna's enclosure'. Although Mynna is not found recorded elsewhere as a personal name, it is believed to be such. Mynna could have been a member of the Tomsaete tribe, The Tomsaete or Tomsæte (dwellers of the Tame valley) were a tribe or clan in Anglo-Saxon England living in the valley of the River Tame in the West Midlands of England from around 500 and remaining around Tamworth throughout the existence of the Kingdom of Mercia. The tribe was identified as Anglian Mercens who came from the north, following the Trent Valley, and eventually settling along the valleys of the Tame, not much is known about the Tomsaete. At this time Minworth was a small and poor manor of only one hide, c50 hectares. There was sufficient land for one ploughteam, but land only equivalent to half a ploughteam was under cultivation worked by a single villein. The manor had 5 acres of meadow presumably along the north bank of the River Tame and a small amount of woodland, half a league long by three furlongs wide. Minworth's entry in the Domesday Book said before the Norman Conquest an Anglo-Saxon, Godric had held the manor from Thorkell, Lord of Warwick, and he continued to hold it thereafter. Norman lords were in control of most of the Birmingham manors by 1086. In the time of King Edward the value for tax purposes was five shillings, a small amount, and this was till the case in 1086.

Before the police force, to stop criminals it was the duty of the people to stop criminals and turn them in, and to encourage that the Minworth Association for the Prosecution of Felons was founded (sometime in the early 1800s) and if you apprehended a criminal you would get a reward.

Minworth Mill on the River Tame ground corn here from at least the 14th century until 1872. By the middle of the 18th century, the mill was also taking advantage of Birmingham's successful armaments trade and was engaged in boring gun barrels. All traces of the mill are now gone, obliterated by a late 20th-century industrial estate which stands on the site half a mile west of Water Orton Bridge. However, traces of watercourses are still visible. Plans to revitalise Minworth in the past have met with a cool reception. A council plan aimed to construct new housing, shops and encourage new industry into the area. However, residents did not back the plan as they wanted Minworth to remain the same. Another plan to develop an 11-acre patch of land into a canal-side marina also met with disapproval from residents, who did not want the Birmingham and Fazeley Canal to become a busy area.

Historic spelling variations of Minworth

- Meneworde 1086
- Munnewrth c.1194
- Monewurth 1230
- Minnewurth 1232
- Monneworth 1288
- Munneworth(e) 1301
- Mineworth 1316
- Muneworth 1327,1332
- Mynworth 1372
- Munworth 1380
- Mynneworth 1419
- Menworth c.1650

== Education ==
=== Minworth Junior and Infant School ===
The provision of a school in Minworth came late to the village. A small school for infants was opened in 1897 and a 35 year old village woman, Emma Hughes, was appointed the mistress. All other children had to brave the elements and attend schools in the nearby villages. The infant school was situated at the side of the wheelwright's shop but it soon became overcrowded and inadequate. The board of education threatened to withdraw financial support from the school unless new premises were found, and a permanent village schoolroom became a priority. On 29 December 1900 a new building was opened on the opposite side of the green. This proved to be a great improvement on the accommodation that the children had experienced in the wheelwright's shop, yet Minworth still had no provision for schooling children over the age of 7 years. For these children, school meant walking to one of the nearby villages to continue their education. With the growing success of Emma Hughes' infant department the necessity for a new school to accommodate the older village children became essential.

== Economy ==
Since the 1980s, the area immediately south and east of residential Minworth has developed as a centre for the industry and the distribution sector, due to its close proximity to the M42 motorway, the M6 motorway and the M6 toll motorway.

A large Asda Supercentre is situated near the Minworth border with Walmley. This opened on 3 May 1977 as a Carrefour hypermarket, before being taken over by the Dee Corporation that owned Gateway Foodmarkets and the larger Gateway Superstores in 1987. Since late 1989 it has been an Asda hypermarket. The original store remains, however, the interior has been completely remodelled; including a instore Costa coffee and McDonald's.

== Water treatment works ==
Minworth STW Severn Trent’s largest sewage treatment plant, serving a population equivalent of 1.75 million. The works treats sludge from a population equivalent of 2.3 million made up of indigenous sludge plus imported sludge from various works in south Staffordshire and North Warwickshire. Minworth is Severn Trent’s largest renewable energy facility with 8MW CHP capacity and Biogas to Grid which produces 30% of their green energy. MWH Treatment was awarded the Minworth THP project in February 2016, after a two stage ECI project. The initial project cost was £37m, with a 35 month programme. Through our early delivery Severn Trent enjoyed increased revenue from exporting gas on 13 June 2018, 4 weeks ahead of schedule, netting them a further £200k.

== Public transport ==
All bus routes serve Sutton Coldfield with the 71 to Chelmsley Wood and Birmingham and routes 77/77A to Pype Hayes, Walmley, Erdington, Streetly and Walsall. Diamond Bus service 76 provides occasional links to Kingsbury and Tamworth.
