= New Hall Valley Country Park =

Country park in Birmingham, England

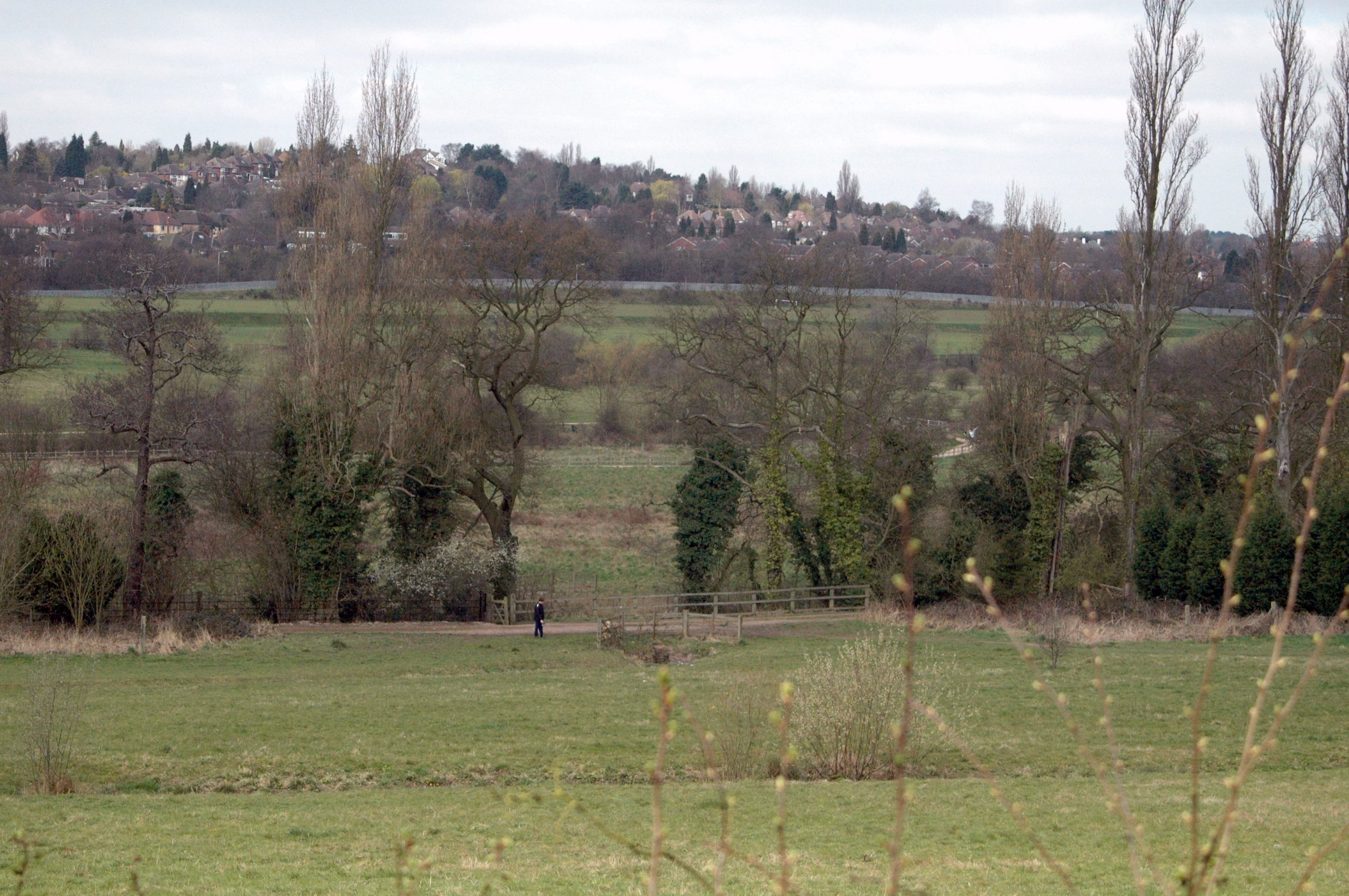
- New Hall Valley Country Park from the New Hall Manor Estate with Maney in the distance
- Interactive map of New Hall Valley Country Park
- Location: New Hall Valley, Birmingham, England
- Coordinates: 52°32′58″N 1°48′30″W
- Operator: Birmingham City Council
- Website: www.birmingham.gov.uk/newhallvalleycp

New Hall Valley Country Park is a country park located in New Hall Valley between Walmley, Wylde Green and Pype Hayes in the Sutton Coldfield area of north Birmingham. It is the first new country park in the UK for over a decade. The park is split into "phases".

It was created in 2005 by Birmingham City Council with funding raised from the release of land for the New Hall Manor Estate development and formally opened on 29 August 2005.

The park covers over 160 acres (0.6 km^{2}) of designated green belt land to the south east of Sutton Park, including ancient woodland, historic wetland grazing meadows, former farmland, and part of Plants Brook. It borders on a number of privately owned listed buildings including the 17th century Grade II listed New Hall Mill, a corn mill. This is one of only two working water mills surviving in Birmingham water mills in Birmingham, with the other being Sarehole Mill in Hall Green. It has been restored and is open to the public on certain days or by prior arrangement. Bishop Walsh Catholic School borders the land, with the school's playing fields running adjacent for nearly 1.5 miles.

The park also includes a network of cycle routes and footpaths (52.550930°N 1.806816°W, a plant nursery, a nature conservation site and two play areas for children.

The park is crossed by Wylde Green Road, which links Walmley and Wylde Green at either end. This road was crossed by a ford until around 1967.

Coopers Wood, the ancient woodland in the park, is under threat of being destroyed due to concerns that its trees, which are Crack Willow, may fall onto people using the paths that have been driven through them.

Part of the Park is again under threat of development as of 2025. With a further 300 slated to be built on green belt land.

You can access the park:

- By foot via Coleshill road at the bottom of Reddicap Hill Road, via the cycle path
- By foot or via the carpark on Wylde Green Road (next to Bishop Walsh School)
- By foot under the railway bridges on Ebrook Road and East View Road
- By foot from Fledburgh Drive on the New Hall Estate
- By foot down the cycle path from New Hall Manor Estate
- By foot from the northern end of Pype Hayes Park via the Plants Brook
- From Plants Brook Local Nature Reserve by crossing Eachelhurst Road heading towards Penns Lane
