= New Hall Estate =

Coordinates: 52.557°N 1.808°W

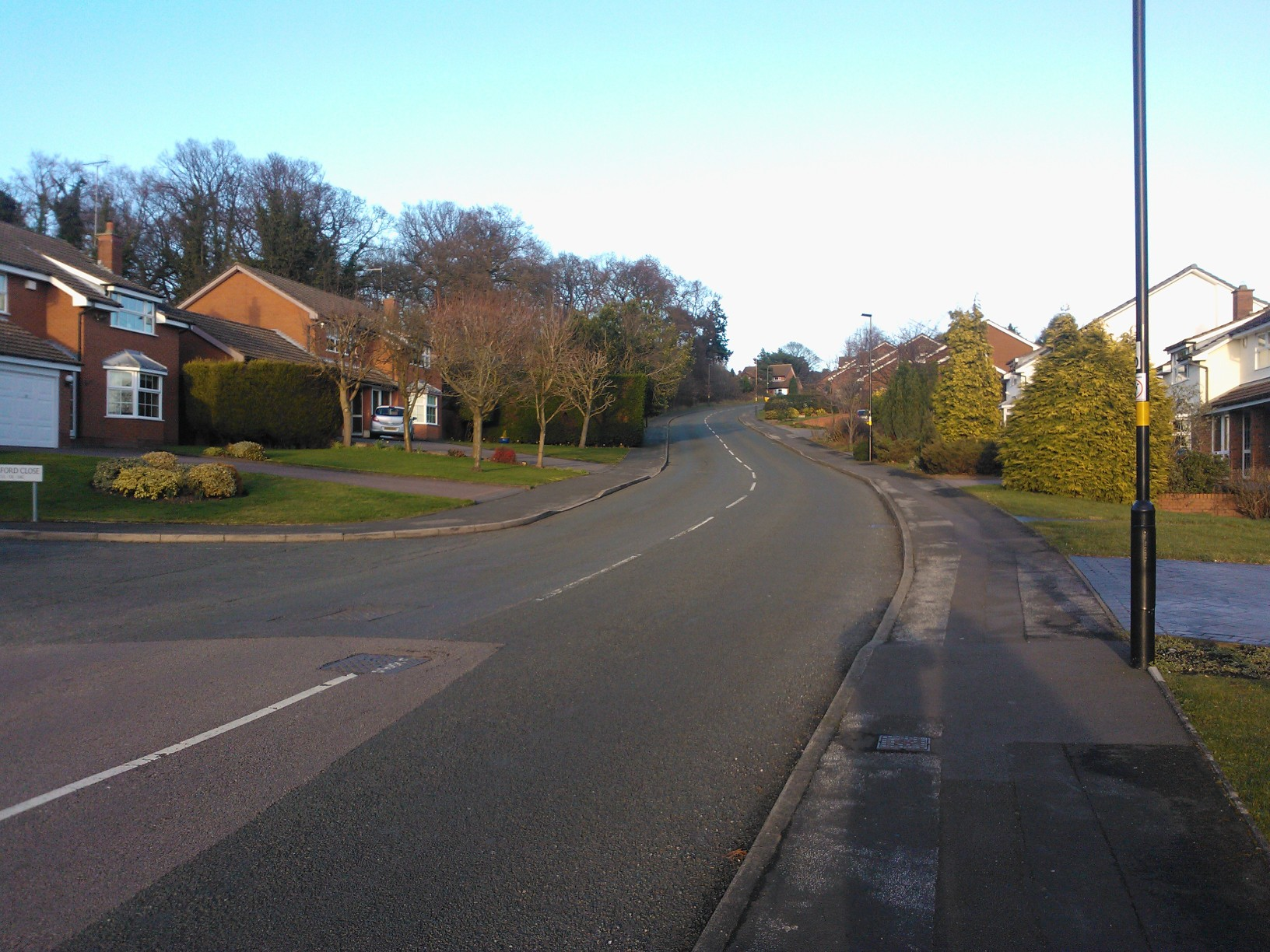
New Hall Estate - Sir Alfreds Way

The New Hall Estate is the older of the two major private housing estates named after New Hall Manor in the Royal Town of Sutton Coldfield in the West Midlands in England. The newer being New Hall Manor Estate.

It was built in a number of phases beginning in the 1980s by Bryant Homes with the final phase (Granary Lane) built in the late 1990s, on land which was formerly part of Newhall Farm formerly owned by Rubery Owen Holdings. It is a maze of roads and a mix of privately owned, detached, semi detached and town houses, with two areas of smaller houses, flats and studio apartments. The construction of the estate was considered one of the most complicated housing projects of the decade in England due to the angle of the land on which some of the houses were built on.

The estate can be accessed via Walmley Road onto Sir Alfreds Way, named after Sir Alfred Owen or via the top of Reddicap Hill onto Betteridge Drive or via the bottom of Reddicap Hill onto Lisures Drive. The start of Lisures Drive follows the path of the old Newhall Drive which was the access road to Newhall Farm which then continued across farmland to New Hall Manor now New Hall Hotel, the Farm was demolished and new houses built in its place on Newhall Drive, which is now accessed off the bottom of Lisures Drive.

The estate borders New Hall Valley Country Park with access to the park from Fledburgh Drive, Newhall Farm Close and the footpath linking the two roads.

The Estate contains many old trees covered under tree protection orders (TPO 313 and TPO 343), including Homewood, accessed from Sir Alfreds way or Preston Avenue, an Old Oak Woodland.

The estates street lighting was upgraded in 2013 to white eco friendly LED lampposts The cutting edge lights not only reduce carbon emissions but are brighter than traditional lights, and enable operators to control and adjust their levels remotely. Residents have reported feeling safer when walking down previously poorly lit streets as the LED lights allow a wider spectrum of colours to be seen and facial features to be distinguished.

== Communications ==
When built the estate was wired with underground feeds by British Telecom, therefore there are no telephone poles. The Estate was later cabled by Birmingham Cable, which was then taken over by Telewest, then NTL Incorporated and now Virgin Media. The Estate was enabled for BT Openreach Fibre Optic Broadband in 2013, therefore there is a high availability of Super Fast Broadband throughout the estate from multiple suppliers.

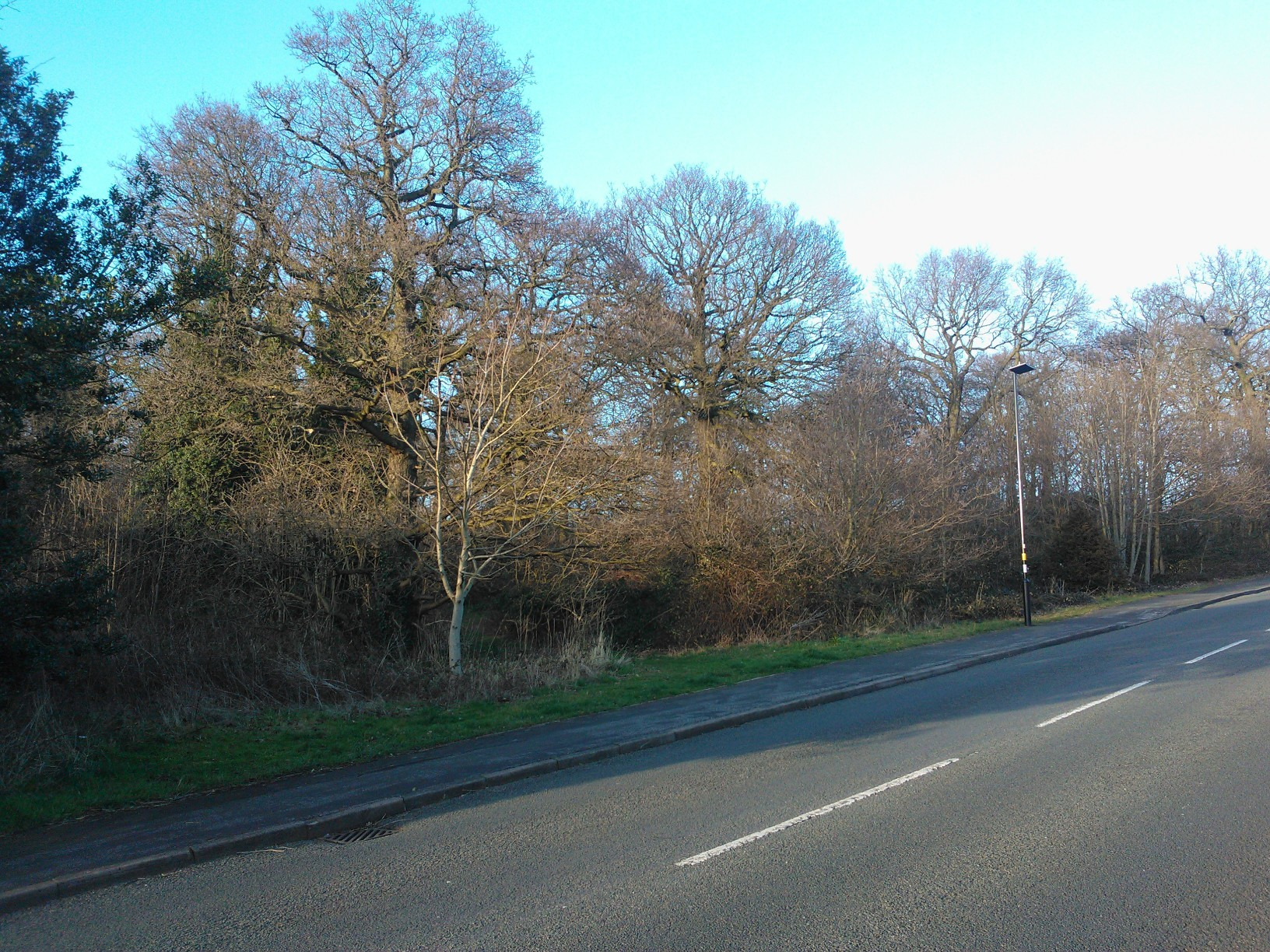
Home Wood - Viewed from Sir Alfreds Way

== Schools ==
The Estate sits in the catchment areas of three Sutton Secondary Schools: Plantsbrook School, Fairfax Academy (a secondary school in Sutton Coldfield), and John Willmott School; and in the catchment areas of Newhall Primary School, Holland House Infant & Nursery School, and Town Junior School. In some years when the catchment areas are wide they may also include Whitehouse Common Primary School, and The Deanery in Walmley.

== See also ==
- New Hall Manor Estate
