= Moat House, Sutton Coldfield =

Moat House
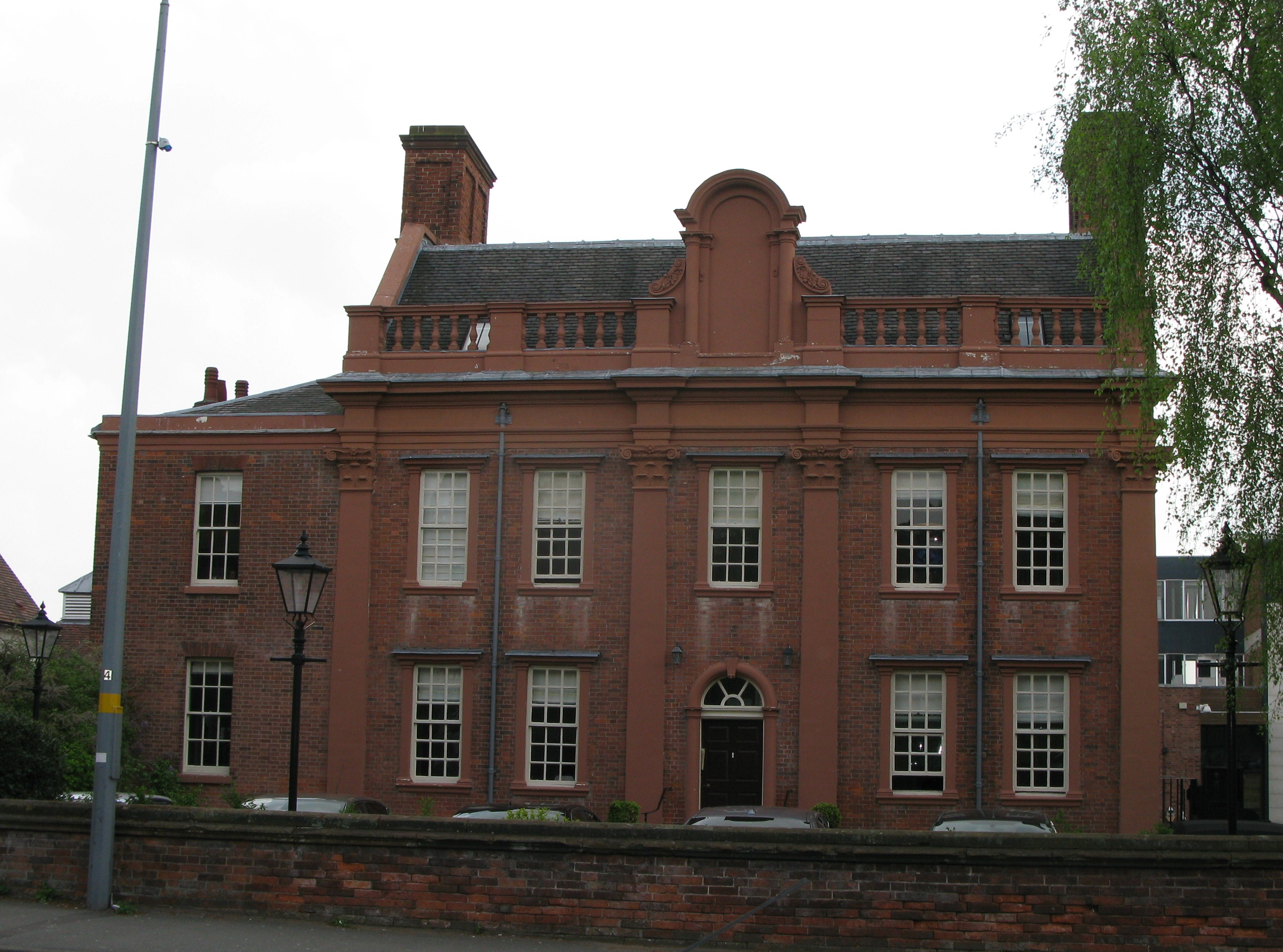
- Interactive map of the Moat House area

General information
- Type: House
- Architectural style: Jacobean
- Location: Sutton Coldfield, Birmingham, England
- Coordinates: 52.567988°N 1.822383°W
- Completed: 1680
- Owner: Sutton Coldfield College

Technical details
- Floor count: 3

Design and construction
- Architect: Sir William Wilson
- Awards and prizes: Grade II* listed

Moat House is a Grade II* listed building situated in Lichfield Road, Sutton Coldfield, West Midlands. It is part of the Anchorage Road conservation area.

The property was designed and built in 1680 as a mansion house by William Wilson, builder, architect and student of Sir Christopher Wren, as a home for his new wife, a wealthy local widow Jane Pudsey who had previously owned Langley Hall with her first husband.

The original gatehouse or lodge, itself a Grade II listed building, and stone bridge remain but no traces of the 'moat' remain. The moat survived until 1860, until which it had to be crossed by a small stone bridge. A sundial is attached to the side of the building.

The property was occupied by the adjacent Sutton Coldfield College.

The Moat House is now the home of Urban Village Group.
