= William Wilson (architect) =

English architect, builder and sculptor (1641–1710)

Sir William Wilson (1641 – 3 June 1710) was an English architect, builder and sculptor.

== Biography ==
=== Early life ===
Born in 1641 in Leicester, he was the son of a baker. In his early life, it is believed that he served an apprenticeship with a statuary mason. It is also claimed that he studied under Sir Christopher Wren at the University of Oxford where he learned to become an architect. He moved to work in Sutton Coldfield in the historic county of Warwickshire after studying.

His first work was Peddimore Hall in Sutton Coldfield. William Wood commissioned Wilson to design the house which was completed in 1659. Wilson was then appointed to carve a statue of King Charles II for the west front of Lichfield Cathedral in 1669. In the following year, he carved an entrance porch for Sudbury Hall in Derbyshire and in 1671, he carved family monuments for the Wilbraham family at Weston Church in Staffordshire. On 11 March 1682, at Masons Hall, London, he was initiated into the Acception, an exclusive lodge of accepted Masons. In 1689, Wilson worked at Nottingham Castle to carve an equestrian statue of William, Duke of Newcastle-upon-Tyne.

=== Career, knighthood, and marriage ===
In 1677, Jane Pudsey commissioned him to create a monument to her dead husband. When completed, it was placed in Sutton Coldfield Church. Whilst carving the monument, Wilson developed a relationship and eventually fell in love with Jane Pudsey, who had been left widowed following the death of her husband, Henry Pudsey. She was forced to leave Langley Hall as she no longer possessed the house. During the relationship with Jane Pudsey, Wilson designed and constructed Moat House on the Lichfield Road in Sutton Coldfield. Here the couple lived after its completion in 1680. As a result of her influence in the courts, she secured a knighthood for him in 1681, and shortly after, married him. The gatehouse at 14 Lichfield Road, next to Moat House, has been attributed to William Wilson and was built around 1680.

In 1693, Wilson was commissioned to design and build Sir John Moore's Grammar School in Appleby Parva, Leicestershire. This was completed in 1697, and he then set to work on two allegorical statues above the porch to Castle Bromwich Hall, which was owned by Sir John Bridgeman, in Warwickshire. In the next year, he was appointed by the Crown Commissioners for the reconstruction of St. Mary's Church in Warwick, which had been destroyed by fire in 1694.

=== Final years ===
One of Wilson's last major works was Four Oaks Hall in the Four Oaks area of Sutton Coldfield. Jane Pudsey's daughter, Elizabeth Pudsey, married an Irishman named Lord Ffolliot. Lord Ffolliot asked William Wilson to design the hall in the late 17th century. The hall was demolished in 1898.

In Church Gresley, Derbyshire, Wilson carved a monument dedicated to Sir Thomas Gresley, 2nd Baronet of Drakelow for St George and St Mary's Parish Church. His last work was commissioned in 1708 by King Edward's Grammar School in Birmingham, for which he carved a statue of King Edward VI.

He died on 3 June 1710, after his wife had died. He requested that he be buried in the Pudsey vault, alongside his wife, however, this caused controversy and, as a result, he bought a plot of land adjacent to the vault for his burial place. After his death, the church built a vestry over his grave so that his grave was inside the church.
