= Peddimore Hall =

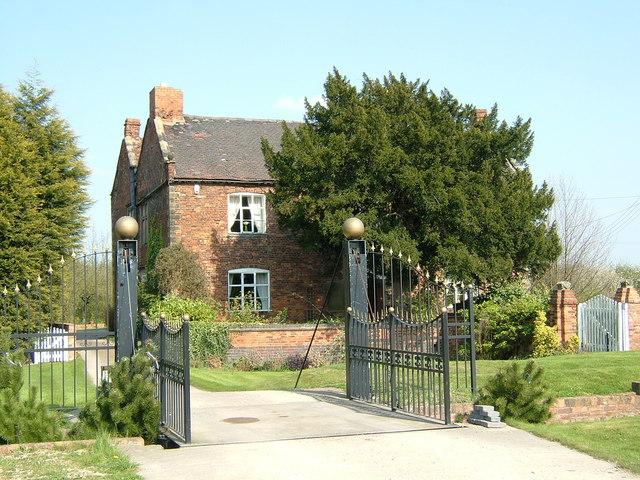
- Peddimore Hall, Sutton Coldfield Listed, moated building.
- Interactive map of the Peddimore Hall area

General information
- Type: Manor house
- Architectural style: Georgian
- Location: Sutton Coldfield, Birmingham, England
- Coordinates: 52°32′26.80″N 1°46′33.61″W
- Completed: 1659

Technical details
- Floor count: 2

Design and construction
- Architect: Sir William Wilson
- Awards: Grade II listed (house) and Scheduled Ancient Monument (moat)

Peddimore Hall is a manor house in the Minworth, Peddimore area of Sutton Coldfield in Birmingham, West Midlands, England. It is a Scheduled Ancient Monument and a Grade II listed building. It is now in use as a private residence.

== History ==
Peddimore was first mentioned in 1281 when it was conveyed by Thomas Arden of Ratley to Hugh de Vienne and subsequently to Thomas and Rose de Arden of Hanwell in 1286. In 1288, the owners of Peddimore Hall were allowed by the Earl of Warwick, William de Beauchamp to fish in Ebrook (now Plants Brook) on his land, allow his pigs to roam in the woods and was allowed to remove timber for building reparations.

A building on site is first mentioned in 1361 when John de Arden was granted a licence for a private chapel.

Peddimore Hall is encircled by a double moat, which forms a rectangular site. A double moat was often used as a status symbol during the time, however, it was also practical in preventing access from thieves, enclosing livestock and also provided water for fires or animals. The double moat dates to the 13th century and a manor has been located on the rectangular site since 1281.

The current brick structure was built in 1659 on the site of an earlier homestead, the structure of which may partly be incorporated into it. It was built by William Wilson and first occupied by William Wood, a prominent Royalist and Warden of the Sutton Corporation in 1662 and 1676. There are farm buildings within the grounds, some of which are timber-framed. The building is built of red brick with red sandstone angle-dressings and moulded plinth. It is two storeys tall. A drawbridge crosses the moat at the entrance. The old timber-framed barn on the farm dates from 1385 and is believed to have not been altered since that date.

When World War II began, the government commissioned a photographic record of the house and grounds for if it were destroyed by bombing. Although a large bomb did explode in nearby Walmley Ash Lane, the house was not damaged in the war.

Archaeological work has been conducted in 1977 and 1980. The first work in 1977 was a ground survey and the 1980 investigation consisted of excavations on site. An archaeological evaluation was carried out by the Birmingham University Field Archaeology Unit in 1998.
