= Langley Hall, West Midlands =

Langley Hall
- Interactive map of the Langley Hall area

General information
- Type: Manor house
- Location: Sutton Coldfield, Birmingham, England
- Coordinates: 52.5580°N 1.7786°W
- Construction started: 1200 (approx.)
- Demolished: 1817

Langley Hall was a manor house just off Fox Hollies Road, one mile from the centre of Walmley in Sutton Coldfield in the historic county of Warwickshire.

The date of construction is unknown; however, by the 13th century, it was the seat of de Beresfords of Wishaw. One member of the family was the Chief Justice of the Common Pleas in 1289, and another was a confidential retainer to the Black Prince.

Langley Hall was a large house, with a moat surrounding it and a pond and fishery within its grounds. It was held by the Earl of Warwick. In 1327, Edmund de Beresford had licence to crenellate the house, making it into a fortified building.

The hall passed into the ownership of the Hores before being owned by the Pudseys, strong supporters of the Parliamentarians during the English Civil War. In the reign of Henry VII, Edith Hore formed a relationship with Rowland Pudsey, and they soon married resulting in Rowland acquiring the hall and estate. One of his descendants, Henry Pudsey, died in 1677, leaving two daughters, Elizabeth and Anne, plus a widow, Jane Pudsey. She later married William Wilson who was a local architect, builder and sculptor. Her daughters disapproved of the marriage and Jane was forced to leave the house. Anne, the younger of the two daughters, inherited the hall following her father's death. Elizabeth Pudsey went on to marry William Jesson, who built Four Oaks Hall with the help of William Wilson.

The history of the hall is unknown during the 18th century; however, it is known that it was rebuilt in brick. The hall was then sold by the grandson of Jenson to Andrew Hackett and in 1815, it was bequeathed to George Bowyer Adderley. In 1817, George Bowyer Adderley sold the hall to Robert Peel who immediately demolished the hall for no indicated reason. The moat remained; however, it did sustain some damage from the demolition of the hall.

During the history of the hall, a farm served the owners. As part of this farm was a windmill, one of only two in the area, the other being located in Maney. A watermill was also operating in the estate for a short time. Both mills were used in the process of corn milling.

The site, now in Birmingham in the West Midlands, is currently occupied by a private residence named Langley House. The moat remains, however, has been drained and is overgrown with plants. Nearby is Langley Hall Farm, which used to serve the hall. Built in the Queen Anne style, it was refurbished in the 1990s into private residences with a landscaped courtyard.
