= Sutton Park =

Sutton Park may refer to the following places:

== England ==
- Sutton Park, West Midlands
  - Sutton Park line
    - Sutton Park railway station
- Sutton Park, North Yorkshire
- Sutton Park, Surrey

== Elsewhere ==
- Sutton Park School, a school in Sutton, Dublin, Ireland
- Sutton Park Shopping Center in Streamwood, Illinois, USA

== See also ==
- HM Prison East Sutton Park
