= Cleethorpes Coast Light Railway timeline =

Formerly the Cleethorpes Miniature Railway

The Cleethorpes Coast Light Railway was founded in 1948 as the Cleethorpes Miniature Railway.

The railway has operated every summer since 1948. It has never been longer than 2 km, but it has undergone complex changes of ownership, management, motive power, locomotives, rolling stock, gauge, length, route and stations.

This article covers the line's history up to 2015. The current railway is described in Cleethorpes Coast Light Railway.

== Cleethorpes' passenger lines ==
Six forms of passenger-carrying rail transport have served Cleethorpes:

- A standard gauge line opened in 1863. It still terminates at Cleethorpes.
- A standard gauge street tramway ran from 1887 until 1937 when it was converted to trolleybuses
- At least two miniature railways ran within the Wonderland entertainment park, the final one closed in 1970.
- The 2 ft (610 mm) "Annabel Train" still runs within the Pleasure Island Family Theme Park.
- The 2 ft (610 mm) Lincolnshire Coast Light Railway ran in Cleethorpes from 1960 to 1985. It now runs in Skegness.

and

- The Cleethorpes Coast Light Railway, which has evolved from the Cleethorpes Miniature Railway, founded in 1948

== Overview ==
Like their full scale counterparts, miniature railways are subject to external forces as well as local events. Cleethorpes is primarily a seaside resort. Sometimes known as "Sheffield by Sea", Cleethorpes was promoted and served by the Manchester, Sheffield and Lincolnshire Railway (MSLR), the Great Central Railway (GCR) and the London and North Eastern Railway (LNER) in turn. The LNER then British Railways (BR) rebuilt their provision after the Second World War, with copious day and evening excursions as well as regular traffic. Up to the early 1960s it was routine on a summer Saturday evening to see every platform at Cleethorpes station filled with long trains waiting to depart and a train in every siding waiting to take their places to return to towns in Nottinghamshire, Derbyshire and southern Yorkshire.

In the late 1940s and early 1950s people were glad to be able to get back to having fun after the rigours of war. Cleethorpes had record numbers of visitors in the early 1950s, often with more disposable money in their pockets. Railways were an established part of life and miniature railways were seen as a familiar, wholesome, sure-fire attraction. Financially the Cleethorpes Miniature Railway (CMR) was viable and generally profitable until the second half of the 1950s.

The market then underwent a rapid evolution in the face of three tidal changes: rising incomes, rising opportunities and rising expectations. The first two went hand in glove. When going to Cleethorpes was all which could be afforded and one of the few shows in town people took it as an opportunity. When rising incomes led to cars, coaches and air travel for more people, a wider range of existing places became more accessible and new opportunities were created. This fuelled rising expectations, so Cleethorpes all too often turned from the choice to a choice to a poor choice.

For those who still went to Cleethorpes the miniature railway turned from a high spot to one of many things to being seen as pretty ordinary. Cleethorpes Borough Council (CBC) made significant investment in the line, seeking to augment purely pleasure riding with public transport functions, such as transporting people to and from the Zoo. This was doomed when the Zoo itself failed.

Patronage of town and railway declined further into the 1980s when the restructuring of traditional industries in their core market accelerated, notably the run down of the coal industry and the 1984 strike. The CMR hit rock bottom in that decade, with CBC considering closing it for good.

Instead of simple closure the council put the line up for sale and found a buyer, meaning the line was privatised in 1991, being renamed the Cleethorpes Coast Light Railway (CCLR).

Like the standard gauge railway, the CCLR's profile and ridership has grown since privatisation. Whether this is cause and effect or coincidence is outside this article's scope. The new owners brought vim, verve and vision, but that has not always carried the day in such ventures. One change the new owners made stands out as having the biggest strategic impact - converting the line to 15 in (381 mm) gauge in 1994. From that point on a whole world of high-profile events became open to the CCLR, collectively known as Gala Events. On such occasions locomotives would visit Cleethorpes from 15" lines of repute and haul trains, Cleethorpes locos could also visit others' galas. These have been financially beneficial in their own right and have transformed the railway's profile, enabling it to attract significant grants and backing for extensions, buildings and upgrades. The traditional market remains, but the enthusiast market has been hugely enhanced, enabling much higher fares to be charged and generating ancillary income from features such as the "Smallest Pub on the Planet" at Lakeside station.

== Timeline of name, gauge, motive power and management ==
From 1948 to 2015 the railway underwent multi-layered evolution. Changes in four such layers are summarised in the table below, where Cleethorpes Borough Council and its successors are shown as "CBC".

Years	Name	Gauge	Motive power	Managers	Notes
1948	CMR	10 1/4 in (260 mm)	Steam	W Botterill, concession from CBC	One season on original route
1949-53	CMR	10 1/4 in (260 mm)	Steam	W Botterill, concession from CBC	New longer route, profitable
1954-58	CMR	10 1/4 in (260 mm)	Battery	A Clethro, concession from CBC	Completely new rolling stock, steady state
1959-71	CMR	10 1/4 in (260 mm)	Battery	CBC, in-house	General decline as the market changed
1972-90	CMR	14 1/4 in (362 mm)	Propane	CBC, in-house	Line invested in and extended, then declined
1991-93	CCLR	14 1/4 in (362 mm)	Propane	Cleethorpes Coast Light Railway	Line privatised
1994-99	CCLR	15 in (381 mm)	Mixed	Cleethorpes Coast Light Railway	Line regauged, significant investment
2000-13	CCLR	15 in (381 mm)	Mixed	Cleethorpes Coast Light Railway	Line extended in 2000 and 2007
2014–Present	CCLR	15 in (381 mm)	Mixed	Cleethorpes Light Railway Ltd	Line bought by P Bryant and J Kerr

== 1972 regauging ==
Changes of ownership and management, rebuilding and fluctuating financial fortunes are common among miniature railways, but the 1972 rebuilding to 14 1/4 in gauge is remarkable, not least as a railway built to this gauge is believed to be unique. Two theories have been advanced how this came about, one is that the track suppliers measured between rail centres rather than their inner faces. The suppliers were an established and experienced company of repute, which would make such a procedure highly unusual. The competing theory is that the suppliers read their order from Cleethorpes Council for a "quarter gauge railway" and acted accordingly, to a tolerance of 1/8 inch.

This was no esoteric matter. The immediate consequence was that locomotives and rolling stock were delivered to 15 inch gauge and had to be re-engineered to fit, incurring cost, delay and reputational damage. Over time costs accumulated with having non-standard equipment and opportunities were lost for any form of locomotive sharing; Gala Days of various forms with visiting locomotives have become big business in the miniature railway world. Finally, the railway would, in effect, have to add a surcharge on any second hand stock they might seek to buy, as it would need re-gauging to be usable.

== Timeline of route, length and stations ==
The route diagram to the right of this text portrays the evolution of the line and its stations. Each new section starts with the opening or closure of one or more stations. The names used in each section seek to use the clearest description or name at the time. Most changes took place in the winter "Close Seasons", though some late-running works resulted in delayed spring reopenings. A service was provided every summer.

The route diagram is not a scale map. The layouts resemble the routes on the ground, but do not purport to be to scale.

01: The Cleethorpes Miniature Railway (CMR) began in 1948. It ran on a curved 300 yards (270 m) route round part of the then bathing pool, straightening out to head south along the coast to the paddling pool. It had a single 10 1/4 in (260 mm) track along which a steam train shuttled forwards and backwards. Neither terminus was named.

02: The railway opened on a new route on 28 May 1949. It had twin 10 1/4 in (260 mm) tracks and ran from Cleethorpes Town near the paddling pool 760 yards (690 m) south along the seashore to Thrunscoe. The route was steam-hauled until 1953, changing to battery power from the 1954 season.

Although the stations were named, and had nameboards, tickets in the early years at least were more prosaic, bearing the words "Pumping Station to Paddling Pool", and vice versa. Space presumably prevented the full description of the Thrunscoe terminus as the Sewage Outfall Pumping Station.

03: In 1972 Cleethorpes Borough Council (CBC) invested in significant changes to the railway. The line was extended northwards on a new alignment to a new terminus near to and named Bathing Pool and Cleethorpes Town was abandoned. To the south the line was realigned at Thrunscoe (where a new, through station was built partly on the site of the former terminus) and extended to a new terminus at and named Zoo, which had not long opened. The aim was to supplement pleasure rides with public transport functions. The gauge was changed to the unique 14 1/4 in (362 mm) gauge carrying new locomotives powered by Propane Gas. The line's overall length became 1,422 yards (1,300 m).

An intermediate station at the paddling pool was proposed but never built.

The line's southern terminus was renamed Leisure Park in 1978 after the zoo closed.

In the 1980-81 close season the line's western (landward) track was taken out of use. Thereafter the railway ran as a single track route.

04: In 1982 the line was shortened by 40 yards (37 m) at its northern end to allow for building the Sea Defence Bank. The replacement station was also called Bathing Pool. The line's overall length became 1,382 yards (1,264 m).

In 1986 the southern section approaching Leisure Park terminus was realigned to accommodate building a new road next to the tracks. The line was bowed a few yards to seaward. This meant the terminus had to be rebuilt on the same site but at a different angle. No attempt is made to represent this on the route diagram.

05: The railway was privatised in 1991. The track, locomotives and rolling stock were given remedial attention and the two stations were spruced up and renamed - from Bathing Pool to Kingsway and from Leisure Park to Witts End.

Thrunscoe station was noted as having closed by March 1991. Information on its closure is sought.

06: In 1992 the railway's length was changed for the first time in twenty years. The southern end was cut back by 250 yards (230 m) to a new terminus named Meridian. Witts End was closed and demolished. A new station was opened north of the site of Thrunscoe, named Lakeside Halt. It was renamed Discovery Halt in 1994 and remains in occasional use. This station is not to be confused with the railway's current Lakeside headquarters which is several hundred yards away.

The line's overall length became 1,132 yards (1,035 m).

Meridian was renamed Lakeside in 1994. It forms the terminating platforms of the present day Lakeside station.

The strategically important change of gauge to 15 in (381 mm) also took place in 1994.

07: The northern end of the line was completely remodelled in 2000. This work started in the winter of 1999-2000 but was not complete when the 2000 Season started, so a temporary terminus - Kingsway Halt - was used to enable services to start. The terminus had no nameboard, just a stretch of gravel and a handwritten notice on a chalkboard.

The line's overall length became 1,100 yards (1,000 m).

08: With the remodelling complete the temporary northern terminus closed and its permanent replacement opened on 11 July 2000. The new line was longer than the old and included a viaduct over the boating lake. This remains the northern layout today.

The new northern terminus was named Kings Road Interchange.

The line's overall length became 1,150 yards (1,050 m).

09: By 2007 the word Interchange had disappeared from the northern terminus's name, leaving it as plain Kings Road.

On 26 May 2007 a significant change to the line took place with the opening of the 980 yards (900 m) southern extension through wholly new territory to the northern bank of the Buck Beck, where a terminus was opened named Humberston North Sea Lane.

The line's overall length became 2,130 yards (1,950 m). TRACKmaps gives the slightly longer length of 2,178 yards (1,992 m).

10: Between 2007 and 2013 the northern terminus building was rebuilt into an impressive presence, visible and attractive from the road, it was also given its third name of Kingsway, which remains today.

Relative quiet on the track and stations front belie considerable positive development with rolling stock, locomotives, ridership, finances, ownership and status in the miniature railway world.

== Locomotives ==
Locomotives which currently work on the line are shown in Cleethorpes Coast Light Railway.

The following locomotives worked on the line between 1948 and 2015, but no longer do so. In addition many locomotives have visited for Gala events, made possible by the change to the widely used 15 inch gauge in 1994. They are not recorded here.

Type, number & name	Gauge	Motive power	Builder	Built	Arrived
LNER 4-6-2 A3	10 1/4 in (260 mm)	Steam	R Eminson	1948	1948
GNR 4-4-2	10 1/4 in (260 mm)	Steam	Bassett-Lowke	c1922	1948
LNER 4-6-2 1949; The Cleethorpes Flyer	10 1/4 in (260 mm)	Steam	Ernest Dove	1949	1949
GWR 4-6-0 1944	10 1/4 in (260 mm)	Steam	G&S/Twining	1939	1950
LMSR 4-6-0 1947; Queen of Scots	10 1/4 in (260 mm)	Steam	Ernest Dove	1947	c1951
LMSR 4-6-0 Royal Scot	10 1/4 in (260 mm)	Steam	R Eminson	1948	c1950
4-6w-4 Wheels, 3 locos	10 1/4 in (260 mm)	Rechargeable- Battery		1954	1954
LNER 4-6-2 4472; Flying Scotsman	14 1/4 in (362 mm)	Propane- Hydraulic	R&A/Artisair	1972	1972
Rio Grande 2-8-0	14 1/4 in (362 mm)	Propane- Hydraulic	Severn Lamb	1972	1972
Rio Grande 2-8-0 2 Rosscastle	14 1/4 in (362 mm)	Propane- Hydraulic	Severn Lamb	1978	1978
4-4-0 The Cub; John from 1996	15 in (381 mm)	Diesel- Mechanical	Minirail Ltd	1954	1992
2w-2 The Ledbury Flyer	15 in (381 mm)	Rechargeable- Battery	John Taylor	1976	1993
2-4-2 Katie	15 in (381 mm)	Steam	Guest Engineering	1954	1994
0-4-0ST No. 1	15 in (381 mm)	Steam	Keith Hardy	1991	1994
2w-2 Morog, later Thud Thud	15 in (381 mm)	Petrol- Mechanical	Austin Moss	1992	1999
0-4-0 Mountaineer	15 in (381 mm)	Steam	W van der Heiden	1970	2006
Sutton Belle	15 in (381 mm)	Steam	Cannon Ironfoundries 1933	1933	2002
Sutton Flyer	15 in (381 mm)	Steam	Griffin Foundry 1950	1950	2002
Mighty Atom/Prince of Wales	15 in (381 mm)	Steam	Bassett-Lowke 1908	1909	
SMR No4	15 in (381 mm)	Diesel- Mechanical			2002
Toby 4w	15 in (381 mm)	Diesel- Mechanical			c2000
John	15 in (381 mm)	Diesel- Mechanical			c1991
Gcr O4 2-8-0	15 in (381 mm)	Steam	Messrs Crome & Loxley	2009	2009

== Carriages ==
The same carriages appear to have been used throughout the line's 10 1/4 in (260 mm) days from 1948 to 1971. Each carriage had bogies at each end and contained three bays, each capable of seating two adults and two children. The trains were usually marshalled in sets of five, giving a theoretical capacity of sixty passengers per train. They were all scrapped when the line was converted to 14 1/4 in (362 mm) in the winter of 1971–2.

The regauging to 14 1/4 in (362 mm) in 1972 called for new carriages. Two rakes of five were built by R & A Developments of Scunthorpe. Each carriage had four bays capable of seating four adults at a pinch, giving each train a theoretical capacity of eighty passengers. Six of the carriages were open, the other four had simple roofs. They were made of fibre-glass. In 1975 R & A Developments fitted roofs to all the carriages and undertook other repairs and maintenance.

The owners struggled on with the 1972 coaches until the end of the 1986 season, by which time only five were serviceable. Despite continuing losses and poor prospects the Council felt it had no option but to replace the lot, accepting a tender submitted by Alan Keefe Ltd for a rake of five articulated, air-braked toastrack coaches with slatted seats. Each had four bays each capable of seating four adults, giving trains a theoretical capacity of eighty. They were delivered in February 1987 and air-braking was fitted to the locomotives.

This minimal stock was supplemented in 1992 by four bogie coaches from the 15 in (381 mm) gauge Longleat Railway. They were able to use the CCLR's 14 1/4 in (362 mm) gauge tracks safely because of their wheels' wide profiles. By the same token the 1987 coaches were able to continue in service after the line's 1994 rebuilding to 15 in (381 mm) gauge.

The single biggest acquisition was in the winter of 2001-2 when the CCLR Supporters Association were awarded £299,000 from the Heritage Lottery Fund to buy the extensive remains of the Sutton Miniature Railway, which had been stored since 1962. This comprised two locomotives, a railcar, four open and six closed carriages, one loco coal wagon, a station canopy, a signal box and a shed. All were safely with the CCLR by 23 January 2002. The locomotives are still in use, they are shown in more detail in Cleethorpes Coast Light Railway.

In 2006 David Humphreys bought the bulk of the rolling stock of the Bush Mill Railway, of Port Arthur, Tasmania and brought it to the CCLR. This included two locomotives, two wagons and five covered coaches. One of the locos remains at the railway, the other - "Mountaineer" is described above. The ex-Bush Mill coaches were sold to the Sherwood Forest Railway, moving there in January 2015.

In late 2008 four fully enclosed coaches, originally built for the Liverpool Garden Festival, arrived from the Windmill Farm Railway.

== Locomotive sheds ==
The original 1948 line locoshed was at the line's southern end, but no photographs have been published.

The 1949 to 1971 railway had a locoshed at the end of a siding which diverged landward from the running lines just north of the Thrunscoe terminus, the shed itself being a short distance southeast of the station, immediately landward of The Pavilion. The shed appears to have been taken out of use around 1968, after which locos must have spent the working seasons in the open.

The new alignment from 1971 called for a new locoshed, which was built, together with a Butane storage tank, on sewage outfall pumping station property at 53.54439°N 0.00845°W. Access was via a siding off the main line which ran at right angles to the sea shore. It had one track and was built of wood.

In 1981 the original 1906 pumping station was rebuilt to cater for the much larger population. This meant the locoshed had to move, so a new one was built 100 yards (91 m) to the north east at 53.5450°N 0.007516°W, in its own compound off pumping station property. This site was partly on the site of the 1949-1971 locoshed, but at right angles to it.

== Passenger numbers ==
Published figures for passenger numbers and finances between 1948 and 2015 are intermittent.

Total receipts for 1948 amounted to £1630, with fares of 6d (2.5p) for adults and 3d (1.25p) for children suggests a ridership of about 98,000.

Total receipts for 1949 to 1953 amounted to £6166, £6388, £3930, £5536 and £4910. The fare for both adults and children was 6d (2.5p) per journey from 1950, implying annual riderships in excess of 157,000.

The earliest directly published figure, taken from Cleethorpes Council Minutes, is of 90,000 carried in 1978, which fell to 53,875 in 1980, largely due to the closure of the zoo. In 1990 the railway carried a mere 26,200 people, which may not have been the lowest, as in the disastrous year of 1986 the railway did not open until mid-August. In 1994 53,770 people were carried, rising to 71,208 in 1995 - "a figure not seen since 1978". In 2000 a local resident became the 500,000th passenger carried since the 1991 takeover, implying an average annual ridership of 50,000 over the 1990s. Figures thereafter were 97,000 in 2001, 98,000 in 2004, 99,000 in 2005 and 120,000 in 2006.

== Fares ==
Fares have risen ahead of inflation as the market has changed and confidence returned that the railway has a higher-value product to sell.

Year	Adult whole line return	Fare at 2023 prices	Notes
1949	1/- (5p)	£2.26	Two single tickets at 6d each
1969	1/- (5p)	£1.05	Two single tickets at 6d each
1979	30p	£1.94	
1989	55p	£1.75	
1991	95p	£2.61	CCLR bought the line
2000	£1.80	£3.88	
2001	£2.00	£4.23	
2009	£3.90	£6.69	
2015	£4.00	£5.67	
2019	£5.00	£6.69	
2020	£4.50	£5.65	Price decreased due to the temporary closure of the Humberston running section & the COVID-19 pandemic.
2023	£5.40	£5.40	

== Finances ==
Published financial data about the railway is intermittent.

Total receipts for 1948 amounted to £1630 (£53453 at 2015 prices)

Total receipts for 1949 to 1953 amounted to £6166, £6388, £3930, £5536 and £4910. The first mention of the railway operating at a loss - to the council at least - was in 1959 when income was £187 less than expected expenditure.

In late 1964 the council discussed closing the railway for the first time. Various figures were bandied about to make or rebut the case, but a firm figure of £550 (£10052 at 2015 prices) was agreed to "run the railway in 1965."

In late 1967 the council again discussed closing the line. The Borough Surveyor said it ran at an [operating] profit of £1,200, which quelled argument, but this was in the face of considerable actual and expected outlay for maintenance and repairs to ageing rolling stock.

In 1971-2 the council spent £40,550 (£516900 at 2015 prices) rebuilding the railway to 14 1/4 in (362 mm) gauge, extending it at both ends and obtaining new rolling stock.

In 1973 receipts totalled £6,796 against an estimated £11,000.

Losses continued. In 1978 the council noted that the line had "not made a profit since 1971." There was a sharp reduction in the numbers carried. Other traditional attractions were faring even worse - Adventureland and the zoo closed, as did the bathing pool when the water treatment system failed. The railway was suffering as the town suffered.

In 1980 the railway only operated "a fitful schedule." Losses for both 1979 and 1980 amounted to £12,000 each, with an expected loss of £15,710 budgeted for 1981.

In 1998 the railway received £106,000 (£168212 at 2015 prices) from the European Union towards extensions both north and south. This contributed principally to the new Kingsway station and route.

In 2001 the railway's supporter's association received a Heritage Lottery Fund grant of £299,000 (£445958 at 2015 prices) towards buying Sutton Miniature Railway equipment.

In 2007 the railways received a European Union grant of £250,000 (£445958 at 2015 prices) towards the southern extension.

In 2010 the railway was offered for sale at £665,000 (£768940 at 2015 prices). Turnover was said to be £297,000 per annum (£343421), with gross profit of £197,000 (£227791).

== Events ==
"Gala" events are significant business in the miniature railway world. Their essence is that staff and supporters from different miniature railways bring locomotives, and sometimes carriages, for a short period - usually a long weekend - to run on the host railway, providing a service greatly enhanced in terms of frequency and variety. The target market is not holidaymakers, but miniature railway enthusiasts. Gala events were impossible when the railway ran on unique 14 1/4 in (362 mm) gauge tracks.

After the railway was rebuilt to the widely used 15 in (381 mm) gauge galas, and contributing to galas elsewhere, took off. A spectacular event took place in spring 2005 to celebrate the first ever seaside miniature railway. This included 100 hours of continuous steam, over days and nights. Such events earned good money for the railway, they also raised its profile further in the enthusiast market.

The pinnacle of high-profile events occurred on 26 June 2012 when the railway carried the Olympic Torch.

== Awards ==
In 2002 the Heritage Railway Association gave their annual "Small Groups" award to the railway.
