= Sutton Coldfield Town railway station =

Former railway station in England

Sutton Coldfield Town
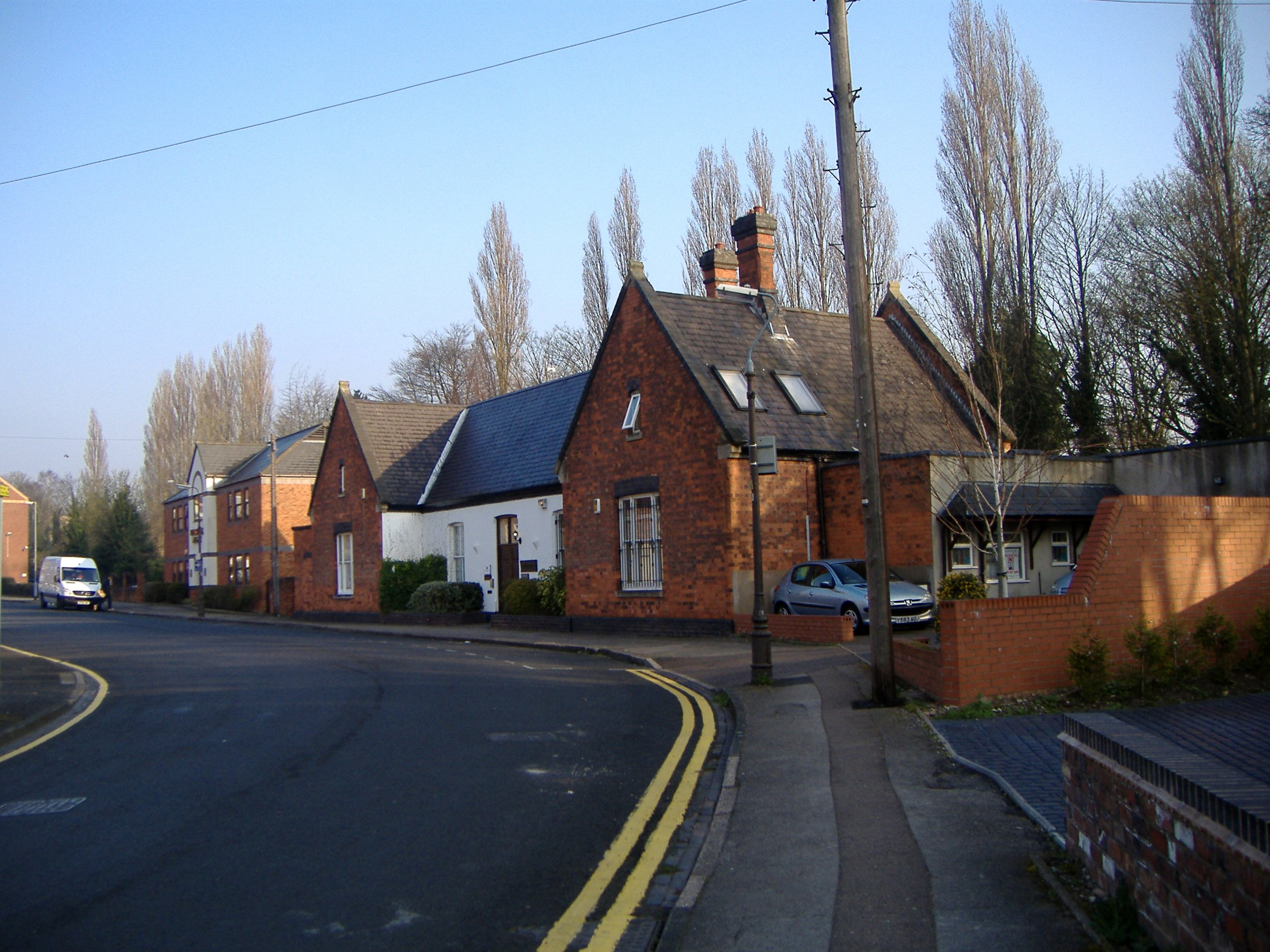
- The station from Midland Road

General information
- Location: Sutton Coldfield, Birmingham; England
- Coordinates: 52.5652°N 1.8198°W
- Grid reference: SP123963
- Platforms: 2

Other information
- Status: Disused

History
- Original company: Midland Railway
- Pre-grouping: Midland Railway
- Post-grouping: London, Midland and Scottish Railway

Key dates
- 1 July 1879: Opened as Sutton Coldfield
- 1 May 1882: Renamed as Sutton Coldfield Town
- 1 April 1904: Renamed as Sutton Coldfield
- 2 June 1924: Renamed as Sutton Coldfield Town
- 1 January 1925: Closed
Location

Sutton Coldfield Town railway station, also referred to as Sutton Town, was a railway station in Sutton Coldfield, Birmingham, England, on the Midland Railway's Sutton Park Line.

== History ==
The station was opened as Sutton Coldfield on 1 July 1879, and was renamed to Sutton Coldfield Town on 1 May 1882. On 1 April 1904 the name reverted to Sutton Coldfield. It was renamed again to Sutton Coldfield Town on 2 June 1924, but closed to passengers on 1 January 1925.

The line remains open for freight trains.

Preceding station	Disused railways	Following station
Penns	Sutton Park Line	Sutton Park
