= Penns railway station =

Former railway station in England

Penns
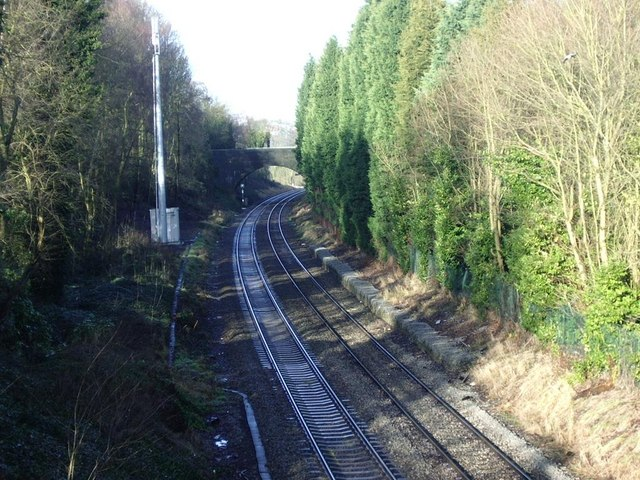
- The site of the station in 2010

General information
- Location: Walmley, Birmingham; England
- Coordinates: 52.5391°N 1.8033°W
- Grid reference: SP134934

Other information
- Status: Disused

History
- Original company: Midland Railway
- Pre-grouping: Midland Railway
- Post-grouping: London, Midland and Scottish Railway

Key dates
- 1 July 1879: Opened
- 18 January 1965: Closed to passengers
- 1 February 1965: Closed
Location

Penns railway station is a disused railway station which served the village of Walmley in Sutton Coldfield when it was in the historic county of Warwickshire, now the West Midlands.

The station was opened in 1879 and was located on the Midland Railway Company's Walsall - Water Orton Branch as the first station on the line after leaving their Birmingham to Derby line between Castle Bromwich and Water Orton. The line then developed into the Sutton Park Line.

In 1965, the station closed and was demolished the next year as part of the Beeching Axe, which had also resulted in all stations on the same line being closed. The line was retained for freight trains.

The only surviving feature of the railway station is Penns Lane Bridge which spans the railway line. The station's site is now taken up by a religious meeting-house and its car park.

Preceding station	Disused railways	Following station
Water Orton	Sutton Park Line	Sutton Coldfield Town
Castle Bromwich	Sutton Park Line	Birmingham New Street
