= Streetly railway station =

Former railway station in England

Streetly

General information
- Location: Streetly, Walsall; England
- Coordinates: 52.5860°N 1.8738°W
- Grid reference: SP086986
- Platforms: 3

Other information
- Status: Disused

History
- Pre-grouping: Midland Railway
- Post-grouping: London, Midland and Scottish Railway

Key dates
- 1 July 1879: Opened
- 18 January 1965: Closed
Location

Streetly railway station is a disused station on the Midland Railway in England. It was opened in 1879 and closed in 1965, although the track through the station is still in use for freight.

It was located on the corner of Foley Road and Thornhill Road. There was a booking office and a ladies' waiting room located on the Birmingham-bound up platform, whilst the Walsall-bound down platform had a smaller waiting room and a signal box upon it.

The down platform had two faces to serve an additional loop on the south side of the main line. The signal box closed from 25th October 1925 and the loop was little used from this date until relayed for the World Scout Jamboree held at Sutton Park in 1957. Around 170 special trains were laid on for this event.

Preceding station	Disused railways	Following station
Sutton Park; Line and station closed	Midland Railway; Sutton Park Line	Aldridge; Line and station closed
