= Streetly =

Coordinates: 52.577°N 1.884°W

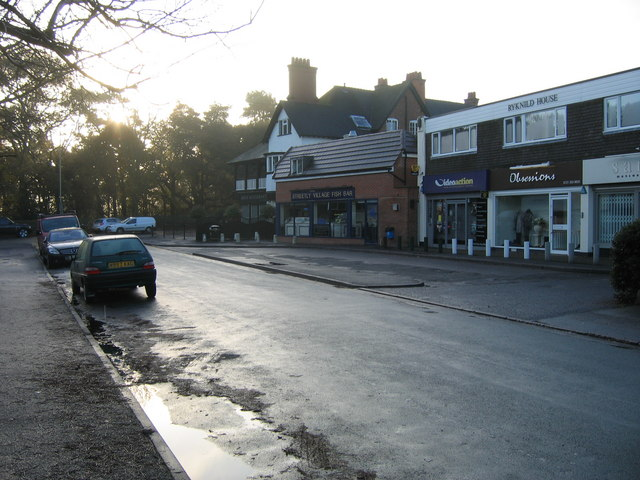

- Location within the West Midlands
- Population: 13,934 (2011 Ward.Population)
- OS grid reference: SP087619
- Metropolitan borough: Walsall; Birmingham
- Metropolitan county: West Midlands
- Region: West Midlands
- Country: England
- Sovereign state: United Kingdom
- Post town: SUTTON COLDFIELD
- Postcode district: B74
- Dialling code: 0121
- Police: West Midlands
- Fire: West Midlands
- Ambulance: West Midlands
- UK Parliament: Aldridge-Brownhills

Streetly is an area in the county of West Midlands, England which lies around 7 miles (11 km) to the north of Birmingham City Centre. It is uniquely located within the borders of Birmingham, Lichfield and Walsall district authorities, and is part of the West Midlands conurbation. It is adjacent to, New Oscott, Great Barr, Four Oaks, Little Aston and Aldridge. Streetly is a semi-rural district, lying close to many farms and is separated from Walsall by open fields and the North Birmingham green belt. The local area includes Sutton Park of which Streetly has its own dedicated gate. Streetly is part of the Birmingham metropolitan area and the Birmingham Urban Area.

Bus services provide links to Birmingham, Walsall and Sutton Coldfield. Most are operated by National Express West Midlands.

The area was served by trains on the Sutton Park Line. However while the line remains open for freight, Streetly railway station closed in 1965 and the nearest station now is in Four Oaks railway station on the opposite side of Sutton Park. There are plans to open a new station on the Sutton Park Line in 2027 adjacent to the old Aldridge railway station which will be slightly closer than the Four Oaks railway station. Initially trains will run to Walsall but there are also tentative plans for the Wrexham, Shropshire & Midlands Railway to operate services to London along the Sutton Park Line.

== History ==
Streetly is named after Icknield Street, a Roman road, of which parts can still be found in Sutton Park. Streetly was a rural area of Staffordshire until the 1950s when the character of the area became suburban due to the mass construction of modern housing in response to the urbanisation of Birmingham. Streetly was in Aldridge-Brownhills Urban District until the creation of the metropolitan West Midlands county in 1974.

The history of Streetly in the 20th century is regularly discussed in a local history Facebook page and the Birmingham History Forum. These resources include links to further online information including the personal recollections of previous residents.

== Education ==
There is one 11–18 secondary school in Streetly, and four primary schools for children aged up to 11 years:

- The Streetly Academy
- Lindens Primary School
- Manor Primary School
- St. Annes Roman Catholic Primary School
- Blackwood Primary School

From September 1972, Streetly and other areas of the then Aldridge-Brownhills Urban District operated a system of 5-9 first, 9-13 middle and 13-18 secondary schools. However, from September 1986 the area reverted to the conventional system of 5-11 primary schools and 11-18 secondary schools following a decision by Walsall Metropolitan Borough Council to bring the former Aldridge-Brownhills Urban District area schools into line with the rest of the borough.

Since September 1992, pupils transferring from primary schools in Streetly have had the option of transferring to secondary schools in neighbouring Sutton Coldfield (since 1974 part of Birmingham) following that area's reduction in the secondary school age from 12 to 11.

== Politics ==
As part of the constituency of Aldridge-Brownhills, Streetly's MP is currently Wendy Morton. Streetly has one councillor at Walsall Council, Conservative Keir Pedley.

== Sports ==
In 2011 Streetly Cricket Club's First XI won the Warwickshire Cricket League Premier Division, which enabled them to play in the Birmingham and District Cricket League for the very first time in their history in 2012. In 2017 they won the Birmingham League Division 3 title.

Streetly also has a hockey club with four men's and two women's teams, and a lawn bowls club.

== Famous residents ==
- Martin Shaw, British television actor
- Peter Bonetti, former England goalkeeper
- Gabriel Agbonlahor, former Aston Villa footballer
- Diane Leather, first woman to run a sub-five-minute mile
