= The Signal Box Inn =

Public house in Cleethorpes, UK

Coordinates: 53.5436°N 0.0095°W

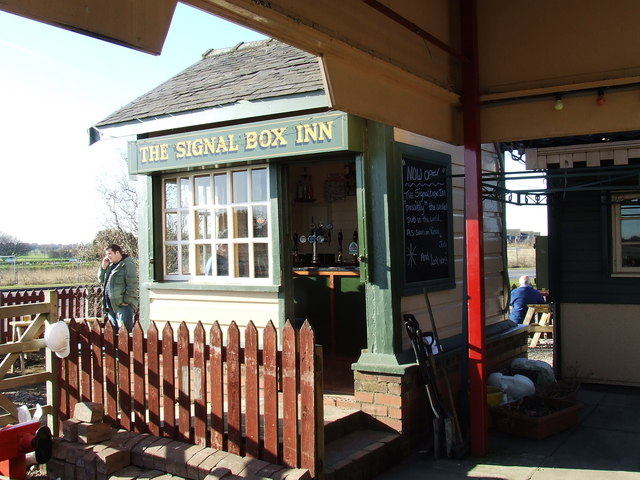
The Signal Box Inn

The Signal Box Inn is a public house in the seaside resort of Cleethorpes, United Kingdom. It was opened in August 2006 and is a contender for the smallest pub in the world.

== Details ==
The Signal Box Inn is named for its location at Lakeside Station of the Cleethorpes Coast Light Railway. The size of the building is approximately to the same scale as the trains that use the track.

It has five hand pumps serving real ale and a beer garden, and was submitted for a place in the Guinness Book of Records.

It faced opposition for the title of the world's smallest pub from Sam's World's Smallest Bar in Colorado Springs, United States. The area of that establishment is 10.12 square metres, as opposed to the Signal Box's 5.95 square metres.

== See also ==
- The Nutshell Bury St Edmunds
