= Sherwood Forest Railway =

15 inch gauge railway in Nottinghamshire, England

Coordinates: 53.1835°N 1.1244°W

The Sherwood Forest Railway (SFR) is a 15 in (381 mm) gauge light railway running through the old site of the Sherwood Forest Farm Park in Nottinghamshire, England. The railway acquired its first two steam locomotives in 1998, began construction of permanent way in 1999, and opened to passengers in 2000. The railway runs along the now-dry, former 'flood dykes' of the early nineteenth-century irrigation system built by the Duke of Portland. The railway is operated by its original two steam locomotives, 'Smokey Joe' and 'Pet'. The line has a light electric locomotive named 'Anne' used principally on works trains, and a light track inspection/works rail truck, 'Lottie Lister'. Also on site is the diesel locomotive, 'Pioneer', built in the 1940s, bought from Brocklands Adventure Park and is undergoing restoration and only in use on special events. Also a diesel-hydraulic locomotive has been acquired to help out. A further steam locomotive, working name 'Doodlebug', is under construction away from the line.

The rolling stock consists of four works trucks and twelve passenger coaches, one from the Exmoor railway, three former Longleat Railway coaches coming from various sites, and a three-car enclosed articulated set, rebuilt on site from the remains of three minirail coaches and five semi-enclosed former Bush Mill Railway coaches from Cleethorpes Coast Light Railway. On site is the remains of the last former Longleat Railway coaches, being donated from the Lappa Valley Steam Railway.

Facilities available alongside the railway include picnic areas, an adventure playground, a dedicated under-fives play area and refreshments.

== Track ==
The 5/8 scale railway follows the concept used for construction of roads and canals in the late 19th and 20th centuries. It is based on pre-used rail, which, being scarce, is in high demand, used together with used wooden sleepers. The one-mile course, on land leased from the same farm previously hosting Sherwood Forest Farm Park until it closed at the end of September 2010, includes a cutting, a tunnel, a level crossing and has engine sheds.
