= The Streetly Academy =

Location
- Queslett Road East; Sutton Coldfield, West Midlands, B74 2EX; England; 52.5692°N 1.8822°W

Information
- Type: Academy
- Motto: Values and Achievement
- Established: 1961
- Local authority: Walsall
- Department for Education URN: 137707 Tables
- Ofsted: Reports
- Head teacher: Billy Downie
- Gender: Mixed
- Age: 11 to 18
- Website: https://www.streetly.academy/

The Streetly Academy (formerly known as The Streetly School) is a co-educational secondary school in Streetly, West Midlands, England, on the border of the Birmingham and Walsall. It was established in 1961.

== History ==
In December 2012, Ofsted rated the school as "Good". The school subsequently became the first school in England to move from "Satisfactory" to "Outstanding" within three years under the inspection framework introduced in 2012.

In 2019, an Ofsted inspection resulted in the school being graded "Requires Improvement". At its next inspection, in October 2022, the school was graded "Good" in all areas, while its sixth form was graded "Outstanding".

== Awards and recognition ==
The school was designated a National Teaching School in 2014 and was also a National Support School.

== Notable alumni ==
- Tully Kearney, swimmer who won gold for Great Britain at the 2020 Tokyo Paralympics
- Connie Talbot, singer and runner-up in the first series of Britain's Got Talent in 2007
- Steven Knight, screenwriter, producer and director, who attended the school from 1970 to 1977

== Former headteachers ==
- Debbie Hunton
- David Binnie

The current headteacher is Billy Downie.
