= Brocklands Adventure Park =

Former amusement park in Kilkhampton, Cornwall

- Previously known as Pixieland Funpark
- Interactive map of Brocklands Adventure Park
- Location: Kilkhampton, Bude, Cornwall, United Kingdom
- Coordinates: 50.875470°N 4.487853°W
- Opened: 1977
- Closed: 2007
- Owner: Vanstone family
- Operating season: March – November

Brocklands Adventure Park was a family run leisure park situated near Bude in Cornwall.

== History ==
The park was established in 1977 originally as a Tearoom and shop but quickly grew in the 1980s with the addition of a large car park and 15 in (381 mm) gauge railway with a diesel driven train. The expansion included ponds, slides and a pony ride track. In 1987 additions were made including bouncy castle, trampolines, bumper boats and quad bikes. The park became known as Pixieland Fun Park. In 1997 a steam train replaced the diesel train and in 2000 the name of the park was changed to Brocklands Adventure Park.

== Design ==
The park itself was split into two parts with the main road dividing the rides to the south and the indoor activities, kids outdoor activities and cafe to the north of the road. The indoor multi-activity centre was known ‘Undercover Playland' and the rides era was known as ‘Upper Valley Adventureland'. There was also a 4 lane bowling alley known as 'Brock Bowl".

The park closed after in 2007 season because the owners Sue and Dennis Vanstone retired. The diesel locomotive, known as 'Pioneer' was given to Sherwood Forest Railway and the steam locomotive was returned to the Exmoor Steam Railway before being sold to the Lappa Valley Railway in 2015. Another park in the area, Killarney Springs, closed the year prior.

== See also ==
- Peter Pan's Playground
