= Cleethorpes Coast Light Railway =

Railway in Lincolnshire, England

Coordinates: 53°32′47″N 0°00′51″W

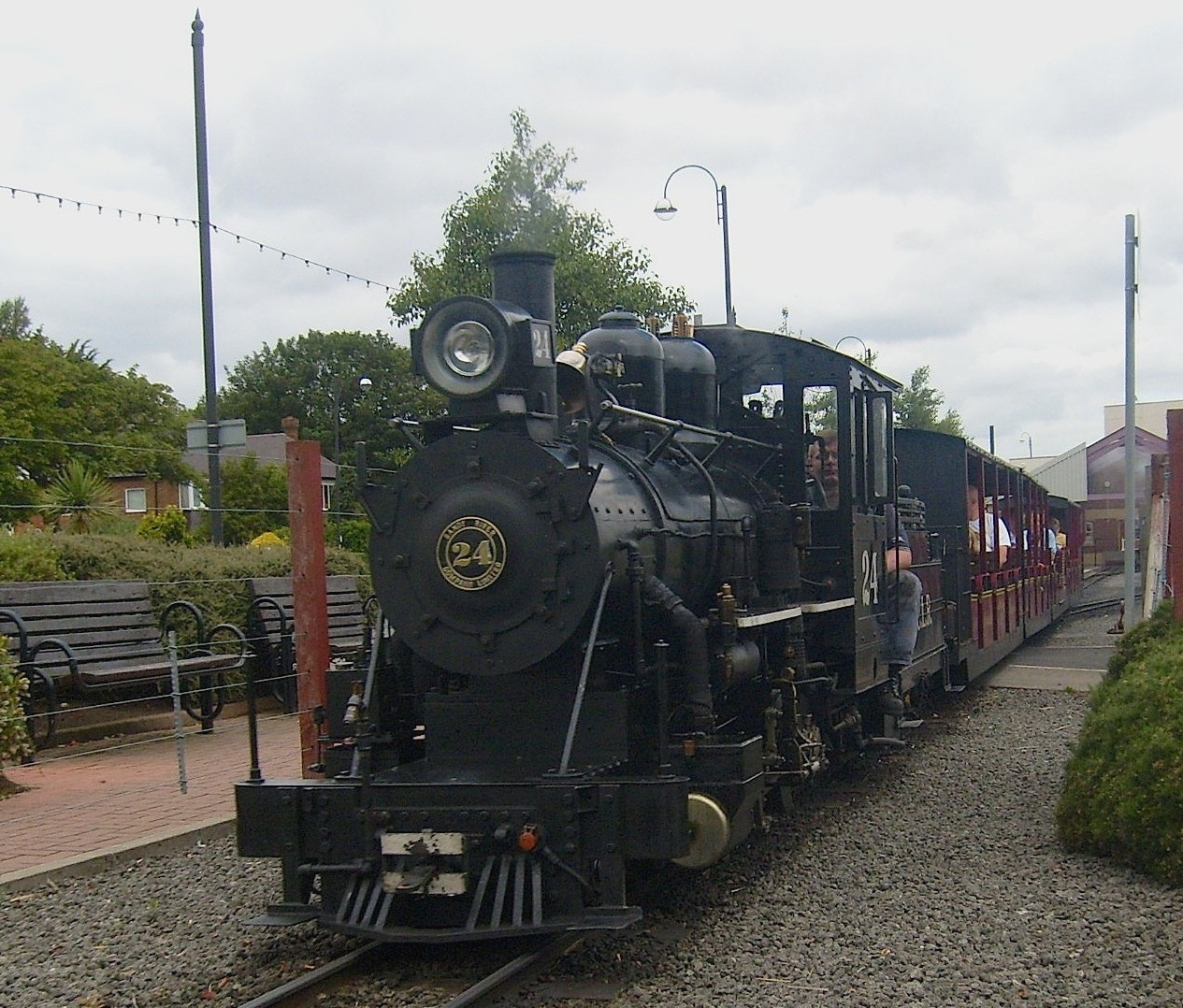
- SR&RL 2-6-2 No. 24 departing Kingsway Station

Overview
- Headquarters: Cleethorpes
- Locale: Lincolnshire, England
- Dates of operation: 1948–

Technical
- Track gauge: 15 in (381 mm)
- Previous gauge: 14 1/4 in (362 mm)
- Length: 2,130 yards (1.95 km)

The Cleethorpes Coast Light Railway is a 15 in (381 mm) minimum-gauge railway that primarily serves holidaymakers in Cleethorpes, North East Lincolnshire, England. It operates from near the Cleethorpes Leisure Centre, running to the mouth of the Buck Beck.

== History ==
The CCLR began as the Cleethorpes Miniature Railway in 1948, and ran for a distance of 300 yards (270 m) near the sea front in Cleethorpes. The line was relocated and extended the following year, and between 1949 and 1971 ran southwards for 760 yards (690 m) from Cleethorpes Town to Thrunscoe (near the current Discovery Halt). The line was extended at both ends in 1972: the northern terminus was relocated slightly closer to the town centre, while at its southern end it now ran as far as the Zoo.

It became the Cleethorpes Coast Light Railway when it was privatised in 1991, and the new company renamed the termini Kingsway and Witts End. Witts End (located at zoo, which by this time had closed to visitors) was abandoned in 1994, and a new southern terminus was built at Meridian (now Lakeside). A new extension from Lakeside to Humberston North Sea Lane was opened in 2007, lengthening the railway from 1,150 yards (1,050 m) to 2,130 yards (1,950 m).

In the 1960s, the line used battery locomotives. On being regauged in the 1970s, two Rio Grande steam outline locomotives built by Severn Lamb were used. Since being taken into private ownership, a variety of steam and diesel locomotives have been used, followed by petrol-driven engines with a steam outline, though genuine steam locomotives are now in operation. A National Lottery grant enabled the railways supporter association to acquire stock from the long-dismantled Sutton Miniature Railway in Sutton Park, Sutton Coldfield, including Bassett-Lowke Class 10 Little Giant 'Mighty Atom.'

The railway held the Olympic Torch on Day 39 of the 2012 Olympic Torch relay with BMR locomotive 'Mountaineer' hauling the Alan Keef 'Council Rake' carriages from Kingsway station to Lakeside station.

The railway was sold to Cleethorpes Light Railway Limited in May 2014 and celebrated its 70th anniversary in July 2018. The railway also had its 75th Anniversary in July 2023

== Present operations ==
Trains run from Cleethorpes Kingsway station, next to Cleethorpes Leisure Centre, over a 40 yards (37 m) viaduct and along the sea wall, turning SSW to run past the sheds to the intermediate main station named Lakeside. The track will continue 900 yards (823 m) south-east to a station named Humberston, close to the Meridian Line car park, and the mouth of the Buck Beck.

The Humberston section of the line has been closed to the public since the 2019 running season due to level crossings in need of upgrades.

== Stations ==
- Cleethorpes Kingsway: Original station dismantled in 1998 and the current station built and opened in 1999 with a viaduct over the boating lake on way into the station. Station building houses a gift shop.
- Discovery Halt: No longer in use, but platform exists, accessed by means of footpath alongside.
- Lakeside: The main terminus with engine sheds and workshops, passing loop and on the platforms a cafe, multi-function space and the Signal Box Inn 'The Smallest Pub on the Planet'.
- Humberston: Opened in 2007, features a signal box. (currently closed to the public)

== Operations ==
There are multiple operational timetables for the 2025 season. The first train departs Lakeside Station at 10:40 and runs every forty minutes between Lakeside and Kingsway Station, with last train times being 15:20, 16:00 and 16:40. Special timetables are put in place on special event days and busy periods throughout the season.

Engine reversing at the terminus to pick up the front of the train

== Steam Locomotives ==
Locomotives which have worked on the railway but have since left are listed in Cleethorpes Coast Light Railway timeline.

Name	No	Wheel arrangement	Builder	Built	In service
Lucy-Lou	24	2-6-2	Fairbourne Railway	1990	In Service
Bonnie Dundee	11	0-4-2	Kerr Stuart KS720/	1901	In Service
Flower of the Forest		2w-2VBT	R&ER	1985	Awaiting Restoration
Effie		0-4-0T	Great Northern Steam	1999	Overhaul

== Diesel Locomotives ==
Locomotives which have worked on the railway but have since left are listed in Cleethorpes Coast Light Railway timeline.

Name	No	Wheel arrangement	Builder	Built	In service
	7	0-6-0DM	R A Lister	1944	Under Restoration
Rachel	15	0-6-0DM	Trevor Guest Engineering	1959	In Service
DA1	6	0-6-0DM	Bush Mill Railway	1986	In Service
Königswinter	5	0-8-2DH	Severn Lamb	1973	In Service
