= Sutton Miniature Railway =

Railway in Sutton Coldfield, England, 1907–1962

Coordinates: 52.5623°N 1.8347°W

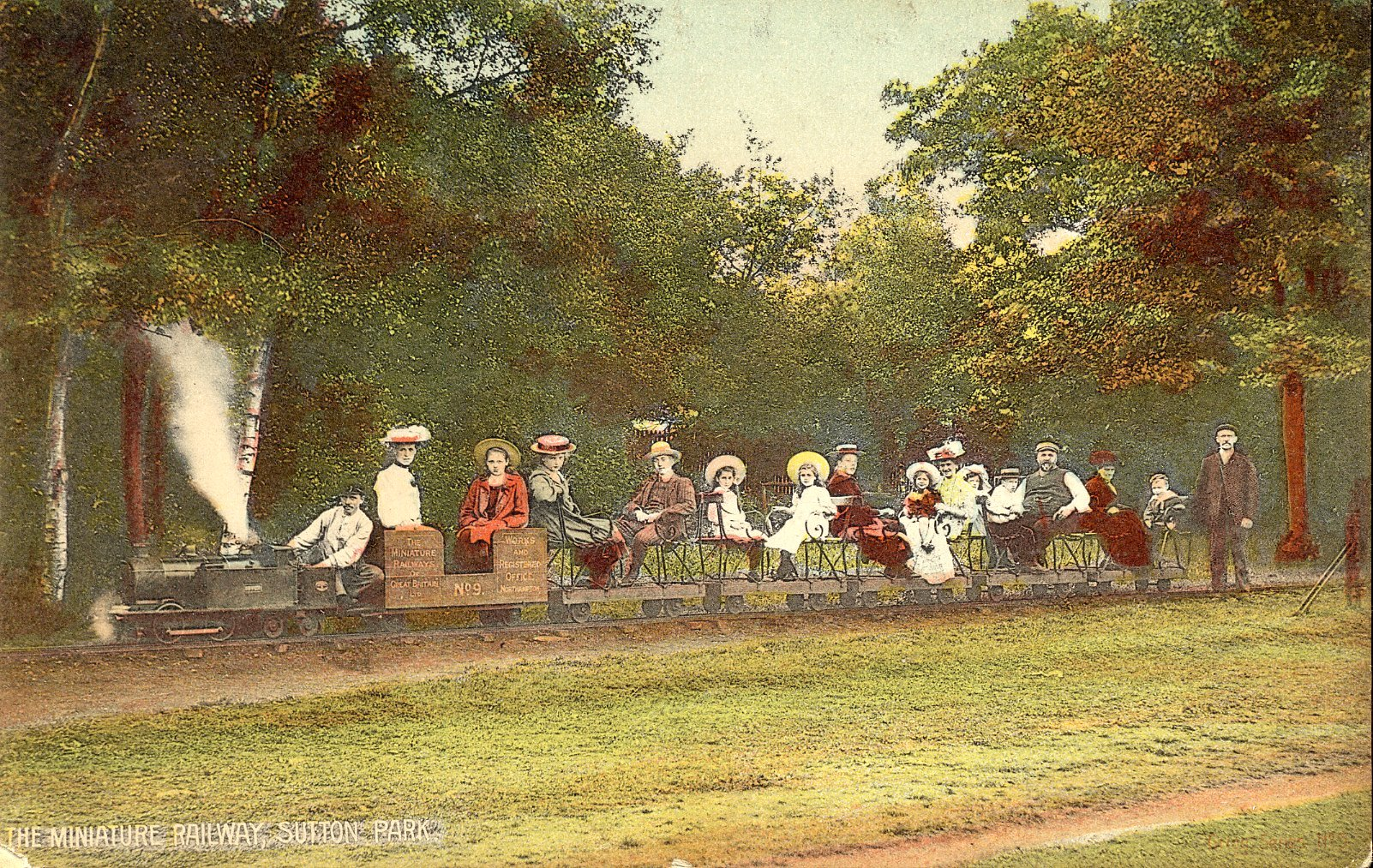
- Postcard showing locomotive 'Nipper' on the miniature railway, 1907.

Overview
- Headquarters: Sutton Coldfield
- Locale: West Midlands, England
- Dates of operation: 1907–1962

Technical
- Track gauge: 15 in (381 mm)
- Previous gauge: 10 1/4 in (260 mm)
- Length: about 2,000 yards (1.8 km)

The Sutton Miniature Railway (SMR) is a 15 in (381 mm) minimum-gauge railway that primarily served residents and tourists visiting Sutton Park near Sutton Coldfield, West Midlands, England. The original SMR is no longer in use but the collection and track is currently under refurbishment and rebuilding at Tyseley Locomotive Works in the West Midlands, as the Tyseley Miniature Railway Project.

== History ==
The SMR was first opened in Sutton Park by the company Miniature railways of Great Britain Limited in 1907, and ran for a distance of 210 yards (190 m).

For its first season the railway used a smaller 10 1/4" gauge and a small locomotive Nipper. Popularity of the line grew with its association with the adjacent amusement park known locally as the 'Crystal Palace'. In 1908 the railway was rebuilt to a 15" gauge, and extended to 410 yards (370 m) with run-round loops at each end. The new layout ran a new locomotive, 'Mighty Atom', built by Messrs. Basset Lowke at their Northampton Works. 'Mighty Atom' pulled three 12-seater bogie open coaches on this line up until 1914. The outbreak of World War I led to a temporary closure of the SMR. Some time after 1914 the locomotive 'Mighty Atom' was sold for use elsewhere but it did return to Sutton in 1938. After WWI the railway did eventually reopen in around 1921-22, but this was short lived and by 1925 the site was unused and had started to become derelict.

Around 1937 a Mr Pat Collins acquired another miniature railway The Great Yarmouth Railway and moved it to Sutton in 1938. At this time the track was extended into a longer approximately 2,000 yards (1,800 m) balloon loop, and services resumed with the locomotive The Prince of Wales, being the renamed Mighty Atom from its time at Great Yarmouth. The Great Yarmouth purchase also included 3no. covered coaches, built in 1931. These were historically a railcar originally built by Parkinsons for the Yarmouth Miniature Railway. It was a novel petrol-electric design comprising a 2-coach set powered by an Austin 7 petrol car engine, in turn driving a 6 kW electric generator, in turn powering 2no. 2.5 hp electric traction motors. When purchased by the SMR in 1937 the powered set was converted to ordinary "dumb" coaching stock.

In 1948 SMR was acquired by Mr T. G. Hunt, and various changes and improvements were instigated by him at that time to the track, workshops, and station buildings. between 1952 and 1954 three further covered coaches were built, to the same design as the "Parkinson" 2-car rail-car set, and 2 open coaches "toast-rack" open carriages, all built by Hunt Brothers in 1952 and 1954 before being joined by 2 more in 1956.

The SMR's heyday was the 1950s, combined with the adjacent amusement park the trains were extremely popular. In one particularly busy bank holiday, the track and trains transported over 12,000 people in a single day. Unfortunately, with the lease on the amusement park expiring, the fortunes and fate of the SMR were intertwined, and it closed in 1962, with all trains, carriages, track and equipment being put into store.

=== Move to Cleethorpes ===
After closing in 1962, the SMR collection went into storage for around 40 years until 2000 it was acquired with Lottery Heritage funding and operated by the Cleethorpes Coast Light Railway (CCLR). Whilst a popular addition to the Cleethorpes attraction, the SMR collection placed additional maintenance burdens that were not viable in the long term And ownership issues (the collection being owned by the supporters association which disbanded in 2016).

=== Move to Tyseley ===
In the early 2020s the collection was acquired by Vintage Trains in Tyseley, West Midlands, and the Tysleley Miniature railway project was set up to go about refurbishing the engines and carriages, and laying track to ultimately provide educational operational services in the future. The restoration work is largely being undertaken by a team of dedicated volunteers.

== Locomotives ==
Current locomotives in the SMR collection:

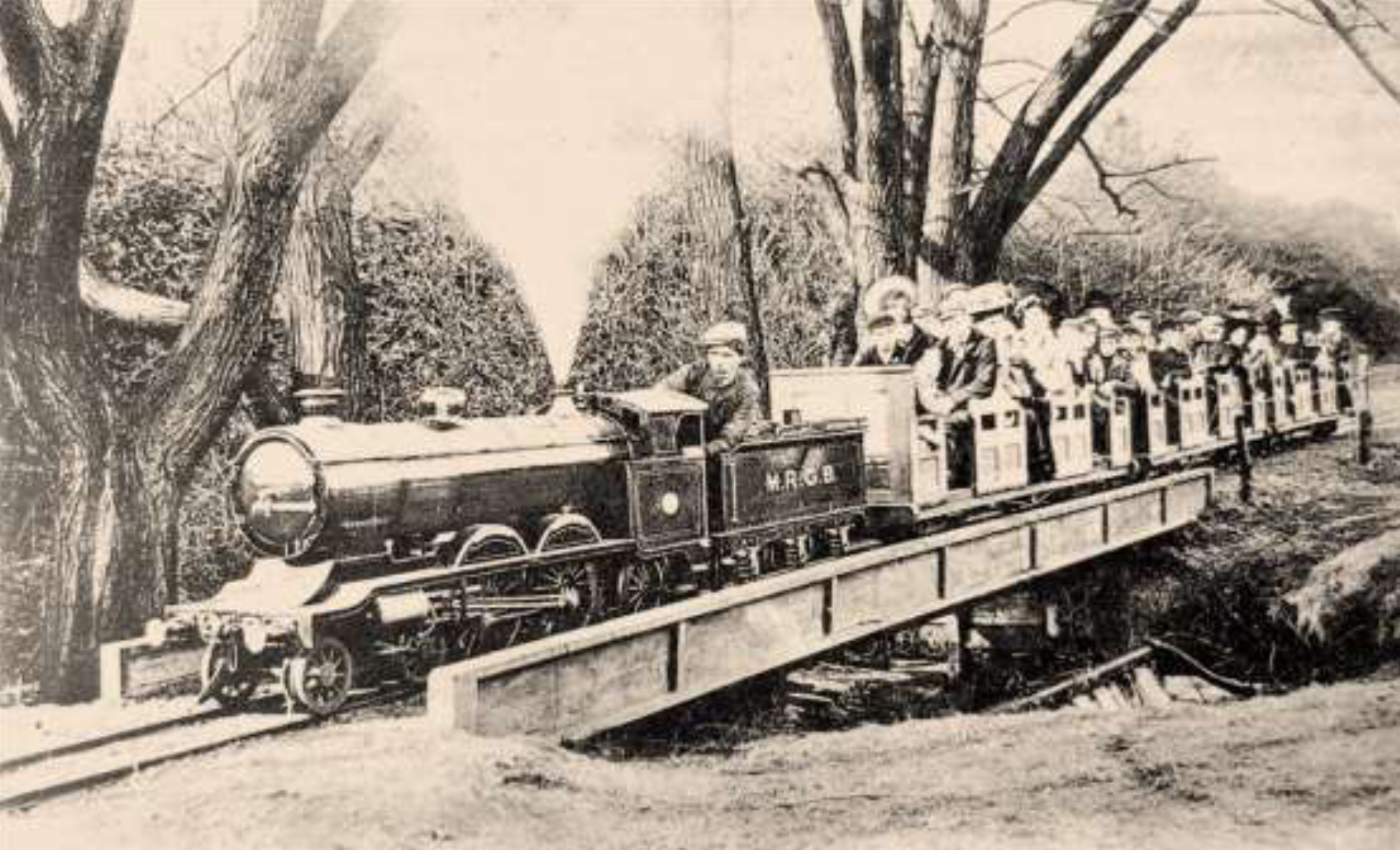
Mighty Atom at SMR circa 1908, with The Miniature Railways of Great Britain Limited (MRGB) livery

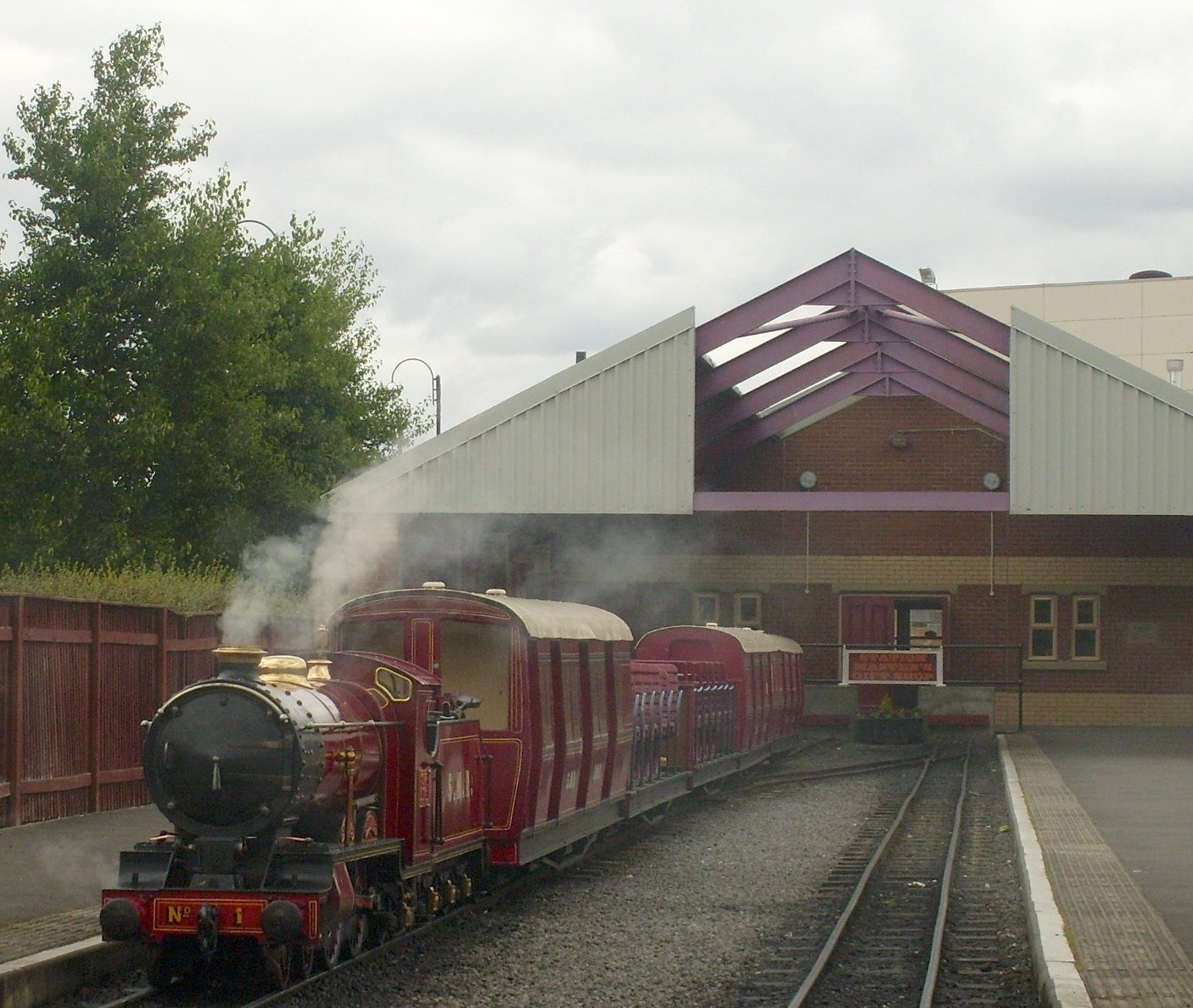
Sutton Belle at Cleesthorpe Kingsway railway station in 2007

- Sutton Belle was built between 1912 and 1933 by Douglas Clayton and his Company the Cannon Ironfoundries. It is based upon drawings and castings supplied by messrs Basset-Lowke. It first ran on a private railway at Clayton's home, Harwick Manor, near Tewkesbury. Douglas Clayton as it was then named, was acquired for the SMR in 1948. It received major rebuilds in 1949 and 1953. After SMR closed, Sutton Belle was kept in store for 20 years, and made a one off visit to the Birmingham Railway Museum for an event. But was soon returned to storage for another 20 years and was eventually acquired by Cleethorpes Light Railway Supporters Association in 2002, and finally returned to steam by the Engineering Department of Cleethorpes Coast Light Railway in 2003.
- Sutton Flyer was commenced by Douglas Clayton in 1938, using all new drawings and patterns. It was completed by a T.G.Hunt and entered service at SMR in 1952. After SMR closed, Sutton Flyer was kept in store for 40 years, and was eventually acquired by Cleethorpes Light Railway Supporters Association in 2002, and returned to in 2002.
- No.4 Petrol Railcar "Dudley" was built in 1946 by G & S Light Engineering in Stourbridge as a Bo-Bo petrol engine railcar (in the form of a GWR design) for the Dudley Zoo Miniature Railway, and was acquired by the Sutton Miniature Railway in 1957. It is powered by a 20 hp, six-cylinder Morris Commercial petrol engine. Currently undergoing engine restoration at Tyseley.

Locomotives which have worked on the SMR:

- Nipper; (0-4-4) In 1903, Henry Greenly, was approached by George Flooks and Fred Smithies of the London Society of Model Engineers with a proposal to build a 10¼” gauge model steam locomotive for a track in Bricket Wood, St.Albans. Nipper ran there for one year in 1904, before being purchased by Mr Basset Lowke and moved to another site at Abington Park, Northampton. That circuit only lasted a few years before another location need to be found, being Sutton Park. After running at Sutton for one year in 1907, the gauge was increased and Nipper was sold on, now believed to be in private collection in the north of England.
- The Mighty Atom, The Prince of Wales (4-4-2) built by messrs. Basset Lowke at their Northampton Works in 1907. Currently resides in private storage, in preservation as of 2009 and awaiting restoration.

| Name | No | Wheel arrangement | Builder | Built | In service |
|---|---|---|---|---|---|
| Nipper | 517 | 0-4-4+T | Henry Greenly | 1903 | unknown |
| Douglas Clayton / Sutton Belle | 1 | 4-4-2+T | Douglas Clayton | 1933 | undergoing restoration |
| Sutton Flyer | 2 | 4-4-2+T | Douglas Clayton/Oldbury Foundry | 1938 | undergoing restoration |
| The Mighty Atom / The Prince of Wales | 3 | 4-4-2+T | Basset Lowke | 1907 | in preservation |
| Dudley | 4 | Bo-Bo | G&S Light Engineering | 1946 | undergoing restoration |

== Carriages And Wagon ==
In Preservation, there's 11 carriages and the coal wagon which have run at Sutton.

- Hardwick Manor Saloon, This carriage was built by Douglas Clayton and made its way to Sutton along with the rest of the stock from Hardwick manor but was found to be to heavy for the line. it was sold along with the rest of the stock in 1956 to Fairbourne. Its unknown exactly when it was scrapped (believed to be 70s or 80s) but the chassis made its way to Austin moss's collection at Windmill farm. Before, being sold and moved to a private owner who plans to restore it to Original condition.
- Carriages 1-3, Built by Parkinsons in their Sheringham workshop during the winter of 1930 for the Yarmouth miniature railway. Originally fitted with Corridor connections and doors (both of which were removed at Sutton).
- Carriages 4-6, Built between 1952 and 1954 they were exact copies of carriages 1-3 (with no6 having a copy of no1s observation end just without the Austin "wings") and all 3 having copys of the blanked off corridors.
- Carriages 7&8, Built in 1952 and 1954 respectively They used the same under frame design as 1-6 and each held 14 people. They are currently used as Track carrying wagons.
- Carriages 9&10, Built in 1956 and were made identical to carriages 6 and 7. Carriage 10 is currently the only restored carriage of the collection.
- The Coal Wagon, This is the only known wagon to be used at sutton and arrived from hardwick manor along with the Saloon coach. However, wasn't sold on and was used on works trains until the line closed
