= Bush Mill Railway =

15 inch gauge railway in Tasmania, Australia

The Bush Mill Railway was a 15 in (381 mm) gauge miniature railway, situated 2 km (1.2 mi) from Port Arthur, Tasmania. It opened on the 4th of April 1986.

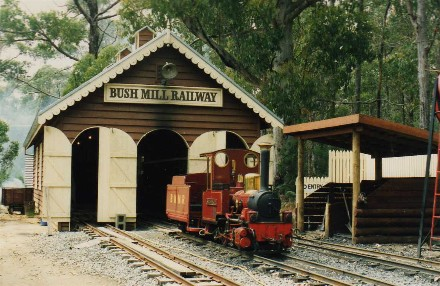
Locomotive Mountaineer stands outside the Bush Mill Railway Depot in January, 1987

== Route ==
The Bush Mill Railway climbed steeply through a series of loops and zig zags up a hillside, then across a spectacular Serpentine Bridge. A half-size replica of locomotive K1, the world's first Garratt locomotive built for the North East Dundas Tramway, was constructed to operate on the line in 1990.

== Settlement ==
A replica settlement was established which featured a 19th-century sawmill and a number of items which were directly related to the logging tramways which once dotted much of Tasmania.

It closed on 30 June 2004.

== Locomotives ==
Name	Built	Year	Wheel Arrangement	Current railway	Notes
K3	Bush Mill Railway	1990	0-4-0+0-4-0	Unknown	model of the first Garratt locomotive. In the summer of 1993 it visited the Ravenglass & Eskdale Railway and the Romney, Hythe & Dymchurch Railway
Mountaineer	W.van der heiden	1972	0-4-0 + tender	Windmill Animal Farm	Originally named Sarah Kate, rebuilt in 1992 with a larger boiler, cylinders, new cab and tender, was rebuilt at Cleethorpes Coast Light Railway around 2012 with new even larger boiler.
DA1	Bush Mill Railway	1986	0-4-0D	Cleethorpes Coast Light Railway	Diesel locomotive, started out as auxiliary tender coupled behind Sarah Kate, until it was rebuilt into a locomotive around late 1986 to early 1987

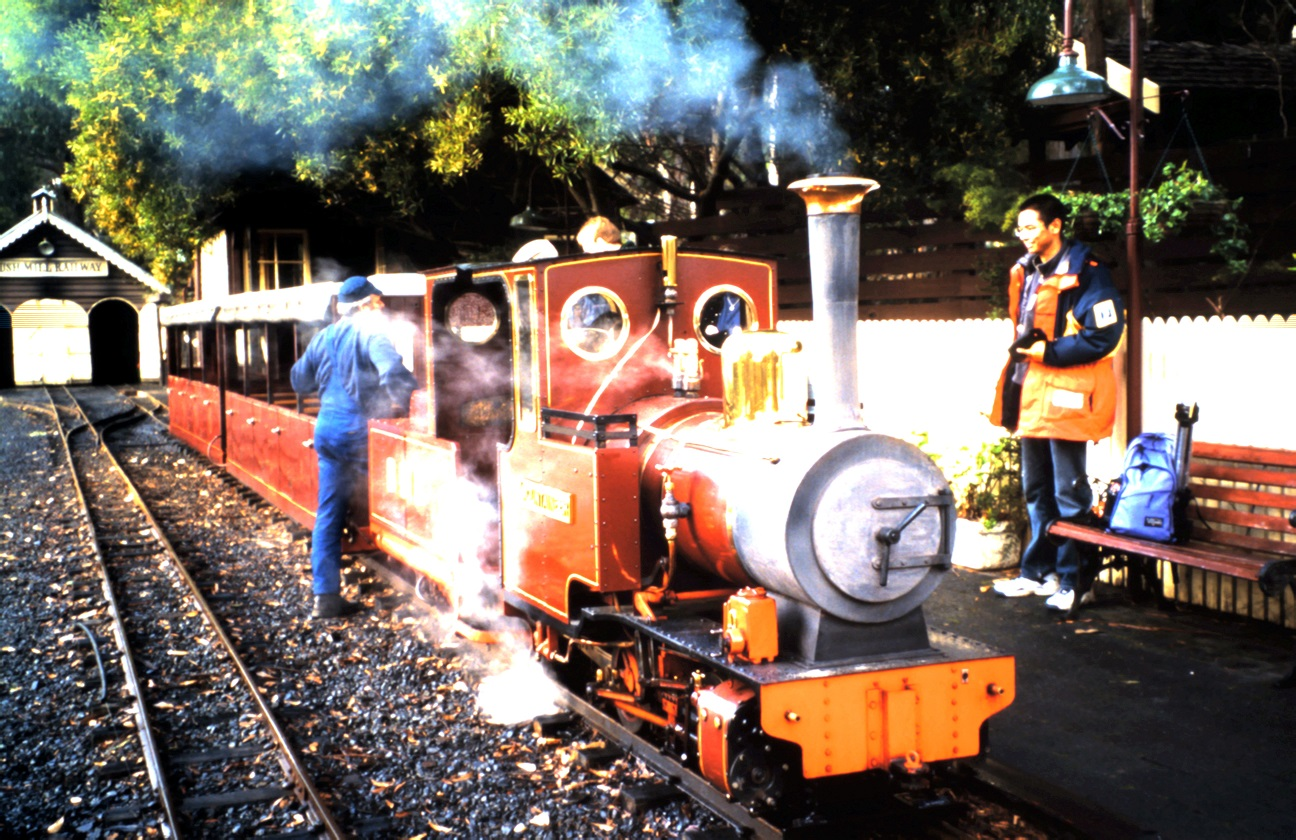
A train on the Bush Mill Railway in July 1998 featuring two of the railway's five semi-open coaches.

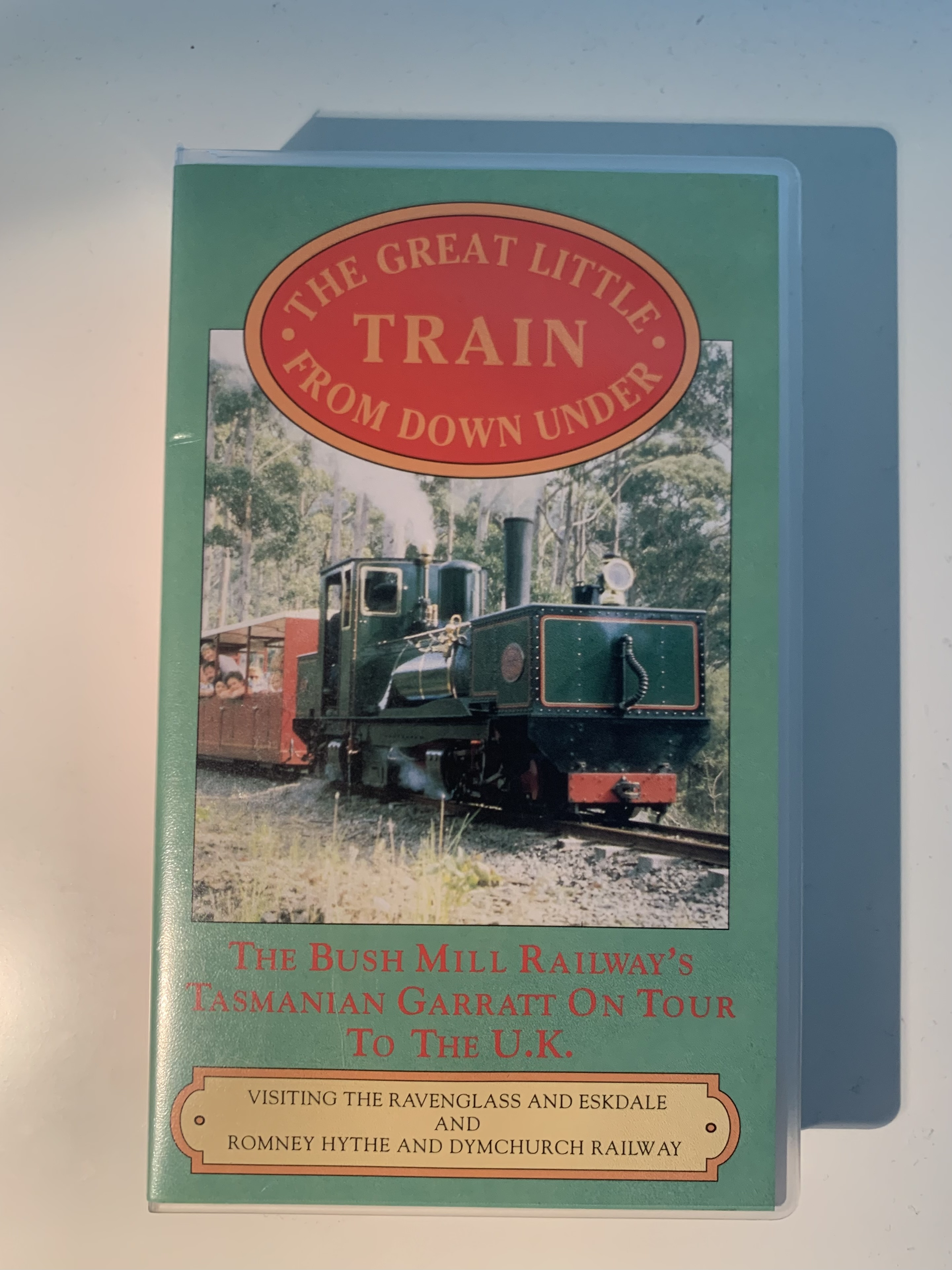
The cover of a 1994 edition of The Great Little Train From Down Under.

The railway also had five semi-open coaches and two coal wagons, these became part of the collection at the Cleethorpes Coast Light Railway and the coaches have now moved on to the Sherwood Forest Railway.
