= Sutton Park NNR =

Park in Birmingham, England

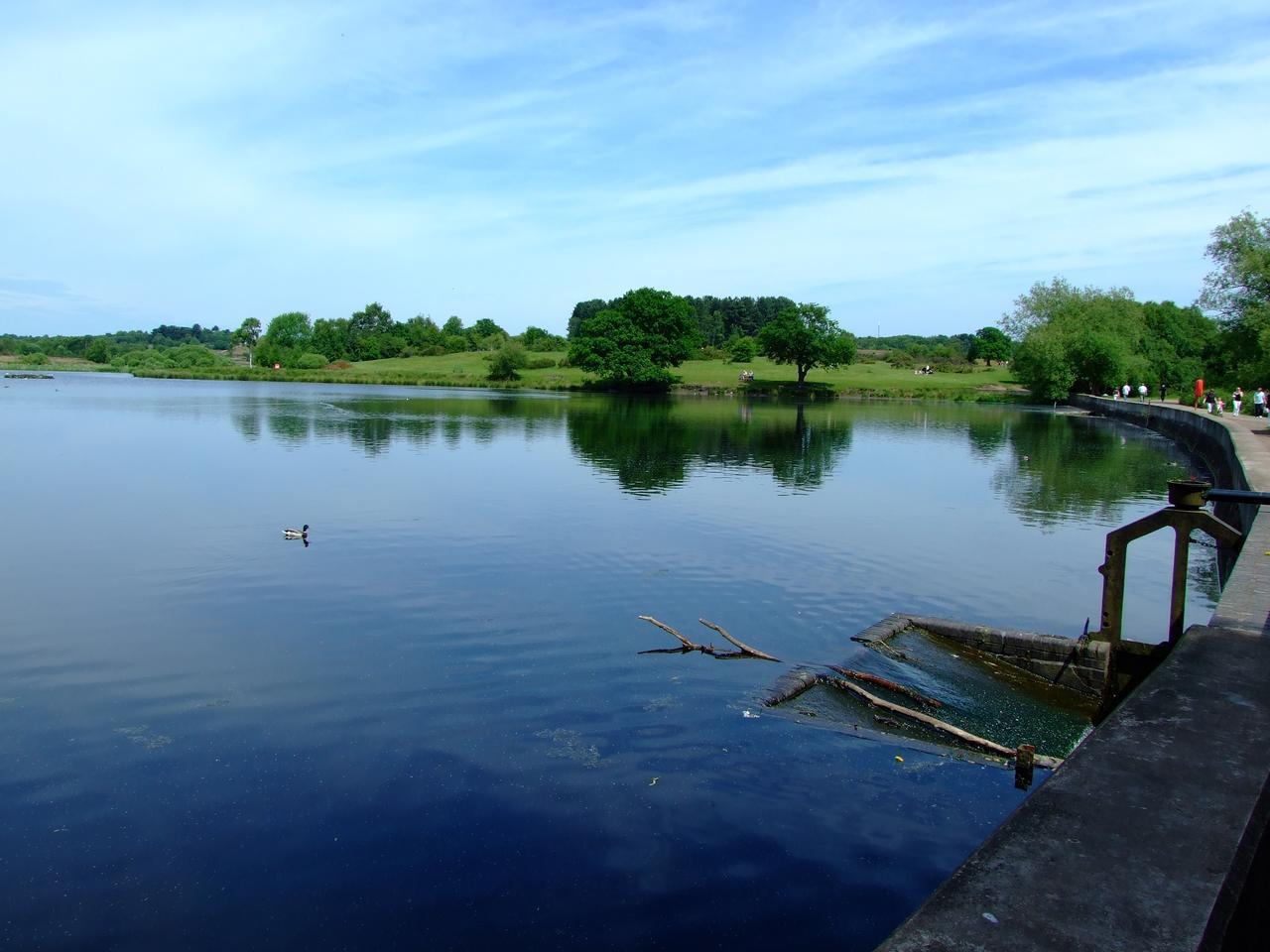
- Longmoor Pool
- Interactive map of Sutton Park NNR
- Location: Birmingham, England
- Coordinates: 52°33′42″N 1°51′14″W
- Area: 971.25 hectares (2,400.0 acres)
- Operator: Birmingham City Council
- Website: www.birmingham.gov.uk/suttonpark

Sutton Park shown within the West Midlands (grid reference SP1096)

Sutton Park NNR is a large urban park located in Sutton Coldfield, Birmingham, West Midlands, England. The park is a National Nature Reserve; large parts are also a Scheduled Ancient Monument. Sutton Park is one of the largest urban parks in the United Kingdom. The park covers more than 2,200 acres (900 ha) according to one source. It consists of a mix of heathland, wetlands and marshes, seven lakes, extensive ancient woodlands (covering approximately a quarter of the park), several restaurants, a private 18-hole golf course on its western edge and a municipal golf course to the south, a donkey sanctuary (permanently closed), children's playgrounds and a Visitor Centre. There is no entrance charge to the Park (parking charges are under discussion). A wide range of leisure activities are undertaken in the park including dog walking, pony trekking, bike riding and kite flying and there are areas to fly model aeroplanes and helicopters. Additionally, a railway line runs through the park.

== History ==
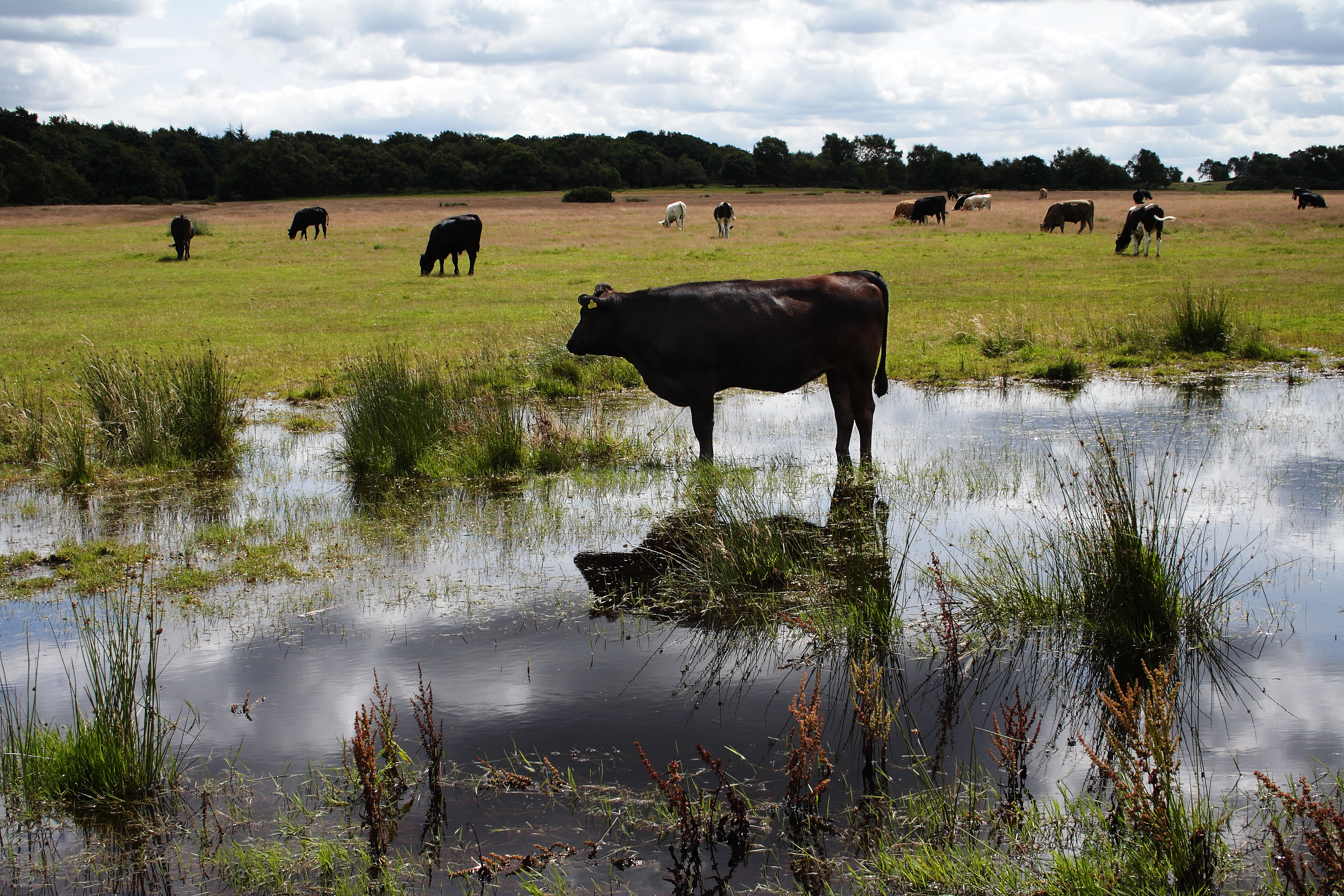
Cattle grazing wartime fields, 2007

Peat-cutting, near Rowton's Well during World War II, recovered flint arrowheads at the base of the peat. There are some unassuming prehistoric burnt mounds, and an ancient well. The park contains a preserved section of the Icknield Street, a Roman road; the noticeably cambered road enters the Park near the Royal Oak Gate and exits towards the aptly named Streetly, the "meadow by the paved street"; it is still possible to walk the road. In 1909, two Roman coins were discovered in the park. The Queen's Coppice, planted in 1953, now covers the site of an ancient tumulus, from which a stone 'coffin' was dug out by antiquarians in 1808. Near Blackroot Pool are the earthworks of an ancient encampment, the origin of this is not known – possibly it was a hunting lodge and it may have been Roman, Mercian or Norman (or even all three, over time).

=== Royal Forest ===
The park was established as a Royal Forest by the Anglo Saxon kings of Mercia, from their seat at Tamworth at around the 9th century. By the early 12th century, it was in use as a Norman medieval deer park. The land was given to the people of Sutton Coldfield by King Henry VIII in 1528 after Bishop John Vesey, a friend of the King, asked for it as a present to the people of Sutton Coldfield. The charcoal burning that took place in the Park is thought to have given Sutton Coldfield the second part of its name.

=== Wyndley Pool ===
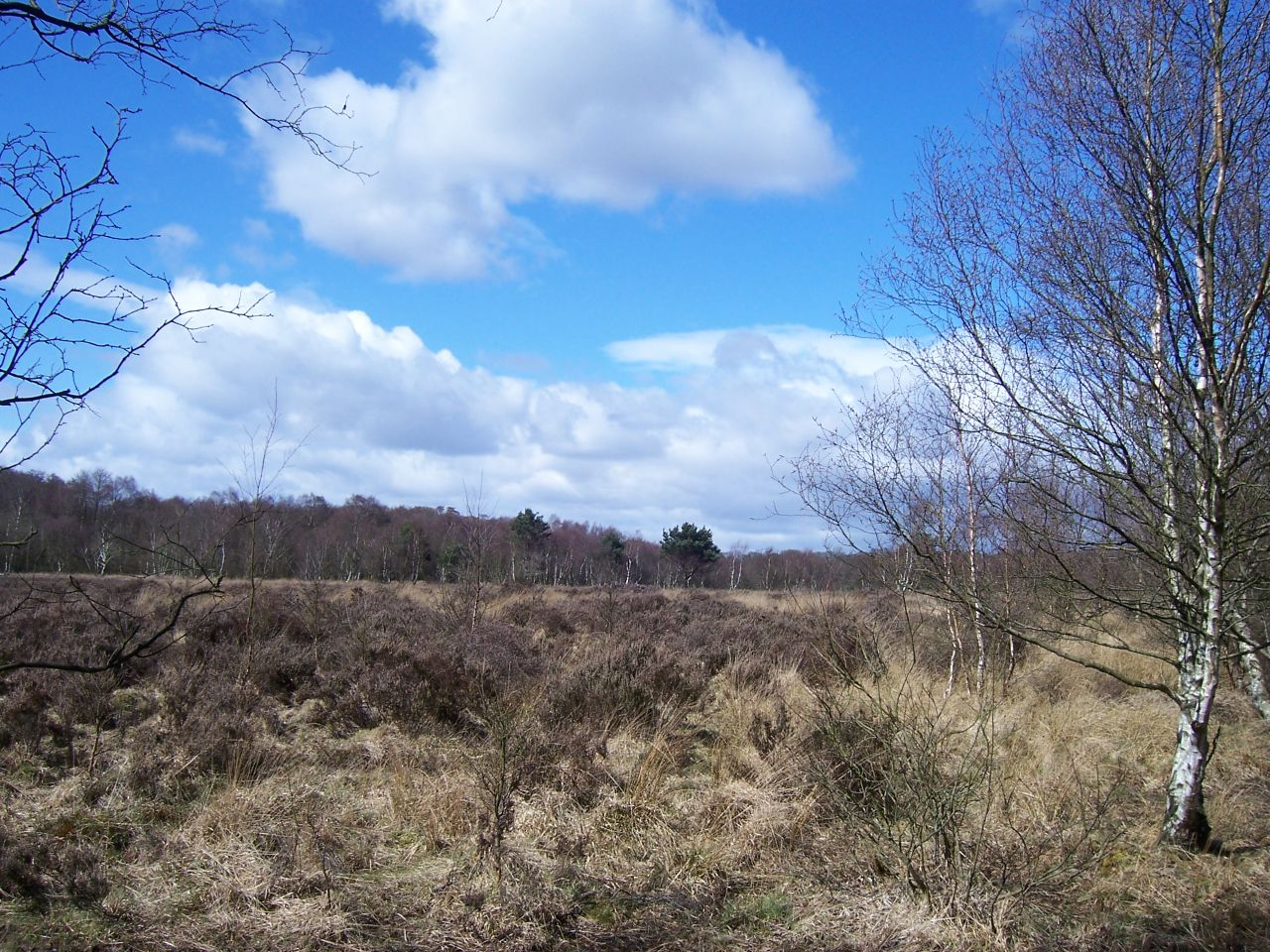
Heathland area in Sutton Park

Wyndley Pool is the oldest in the Park, perhaps dating from the 12th century or even earlier. The house of the Royal Steward sat on the bluff overlooking Wyndley Pool. Keeper's Pool and Bracebridge Pool date from the 15th century. Powell's Pool, Longmoor Pool, and Blackroot date from the 18th century, and were created to run watermills. There was another pool at Boldmere, now outside the park, but this has since vanished. Most of the Park has been undisturbed since then. The area of Ladywood, at Four Oaks, was taken for housing, but in exchange the Meadow Platt area near the town was added to the Park, thus allowing the construction of a new Park Road access from the town.

=== Railway station ===
A railway line, the Sutton Park line, was built through the Park in 1879 and the Park had its own station. The advent of the railway, and the new town entrance, greatly increased the number of visitors to the Park. The Park's own dedicated station was closed in 1964, and the line now only serves goods trains, steam specials and diverted passenger workings.

Construction of the line resulted in the filling in of an area of wetland known as "Webb's Stows", causing the loss of several species of rare plants from the park.

=== Sutton Miniature Railway ===
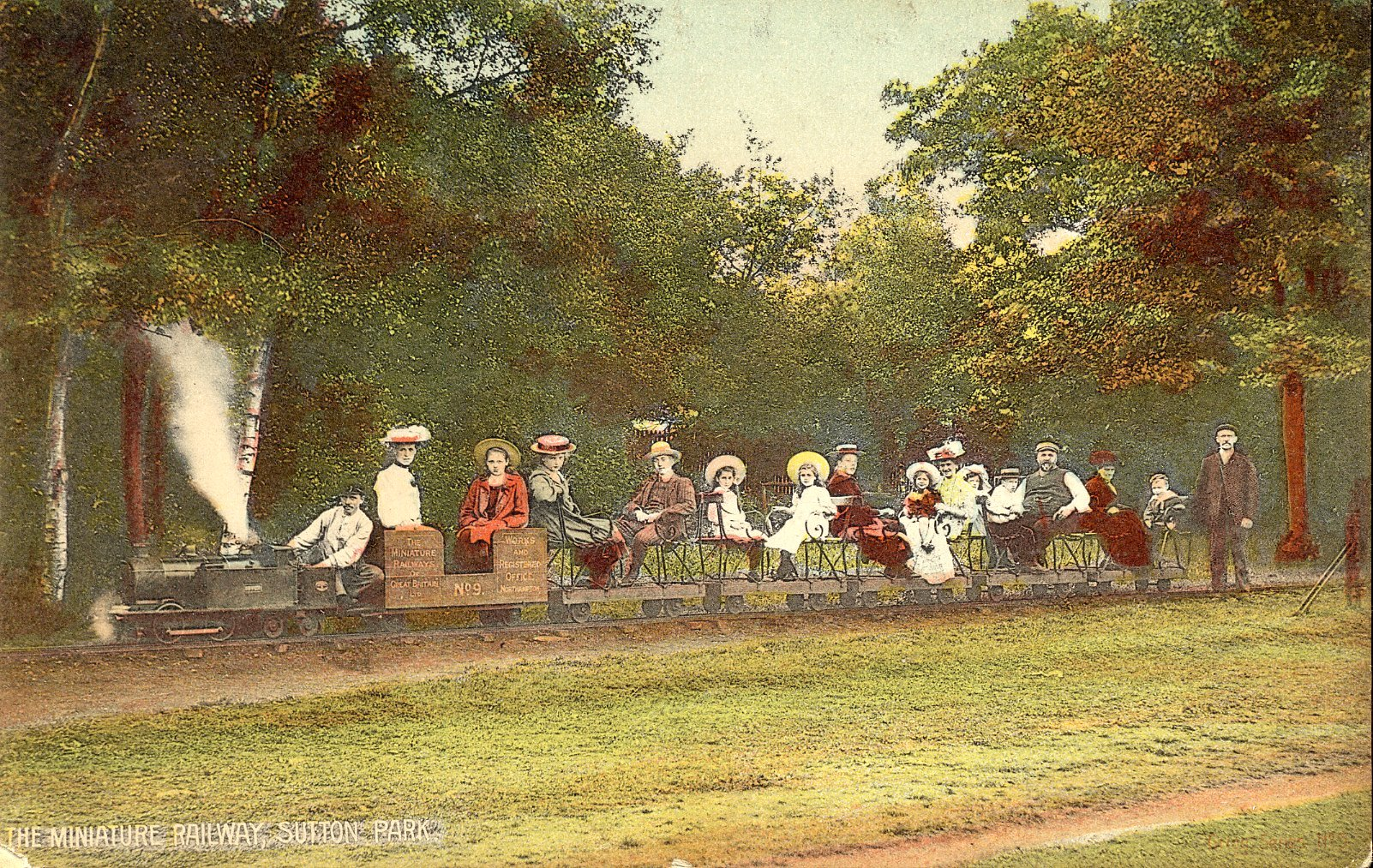
Postcard showing Locomotive 'Nipper' and train, on the miniature railway.

The Sutton Miniature Railway ran near to the present-day Wyndley Leisure Centre, from circa 1905 until the 1960s, when it was dismantled and the equipment put into store. The stock and engine shed are now at the Vintage Trains Depot at Tyseley, Birmingham.

=== Wartime camps ===
During World War I, convalescent camps were built in the Park. During World War II further camps were built; these were first used for enemy aliens, then for U.S. forces prior to D-Day, and finally for Nazi German and Italian prisoners of war.

=== Scouting ===
In 1957, the 50th anniversary of Scouting was celebrated when the 9th World Scout Jamboree, held concurrently with the 6th World Rover Moot and the 2nd World Scout Indaba, was held in the park, with participants from all over the world. The event is commemorated by a short stone pillar in the centre of the park.

=== Radio 1 Roadshow ===
On 30 August 1992, 100,000 fans attended BBC Radio 1's biggest ever Roadshow to celebrate the 25th anniversary of Radio 1 with live performances from bands including Del Amitri, Aswad, The Farm and Status Quo. Free buses were provided by Travel West Midlands and a large Radio 1 Air ship floated above the park.

=== Lido ===
There was a rare 1887 lido, for open-air all-weather swimming, at Keepers Pool but the lido closed in 2003 after arson, and was burned down entirely in 2004. The Lido area has now been purposely reverted to woodland and wetland.

== Sports ==
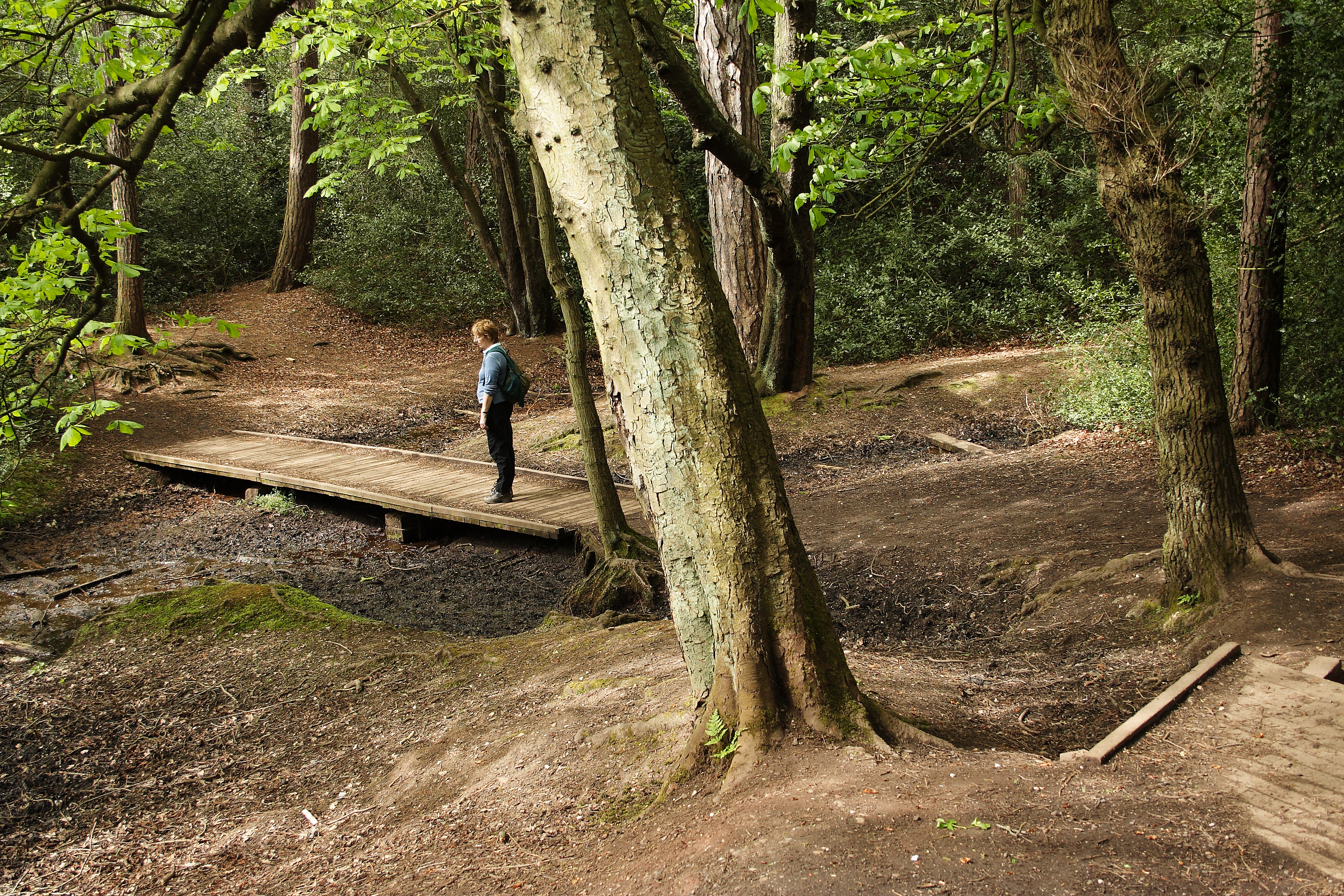
Woodland near Bracebridge Pool

The park is used for a number of sports. These include mountain biking, with the "Skeleton Hill" being popular with downhill bikers.

A number of running events are staged in the park. These include:

- Seven Pools Run (March)
- Midland Counties men's 12-stage and women's 6-stage relays (March)
- ERRA National men's 12-stage and women's 6-stage relays (April)
- National Masters (BMAF) Open Road Relays (May)
- Royal Mail 5k / 10k Fun Run (May)
- Hill West 10k (May)
- Great Midlands Fun Run (June)
- Race for Life (June)
- City of Birmingham 10k / 5k Fun Run (September)
- Midland Counties men's 6-stage and women's 4-stage relays (September)
- Birmingham Insurance Institute 5k / 10k Fun Run (September)
- Teach First's Run 10k + kids' 2k (September)
- ERRA National men's 6-stage and women's 4-stage relays (October)

There is a free 5 km parkrun event in the park at 9:00am every Saturday, starting at Boldmere Gate.

The City of Birmingham triathlon event is held in July with the open water swim stage taking place in Powell's Pool.

The Park hosted the triathlon events for the 2022 Commonwealth Games. The swimming occurred in Powell's Pool, while the cycling took to the streets of Boldmere before transitioning to the park itself.

Be Military Fit hold fitness classes up to six days a week in the park close to the Boldmere Gate.

There are countless cycling routes throughout the park for all different capabilities. There is an 18-hole golf course near to the Streetly Gate entrance to the park.

There is a section of grass sectioned off for the usage of model aeroplanes and helicopters. This is between Boldmere Gate and the Jamboree Stone and can be accessed at most times by car from Boldmere Gate.

Sutton Park has also been used for motor rallying, and was a popular spectator stage on the Lombard RAC Rally in the 1970s and 1980s.

Also there are many watersports in the park, including fishing, rowing and sailing on Powell's Pool, where the Sutton Sailing Club sails regularly throughout the year. Royal Sutton Coldfield Canoe Club use Blackroot Pool.

== Wildlife ==
Nightjars formerly bred in the park; the last recorded being in 1957, the year of the Scout Jamboree. Since then, there have only been two sightings, in 1974 and 2005. Both red grouse and black grouse were in the park until 1868 and 1897 respectively.

== Hydrology ==
Two streams rise in the park, Plants Brook (also known as the Ebrook or East Brook) and its tributary Longmoor Brook, as well as several of their smaller tributaries and man-made drainage channels. These feed a number of man-made pools and reservoirs. Their outflow, outside the park is into the River Tame, and ultimately via the River Trent and the Humber, into the North Sea. Following heavy rainfall, water is fed into the streams from outside the park via storm drains known as "Combined Sewer Overflows".

== Current status ==
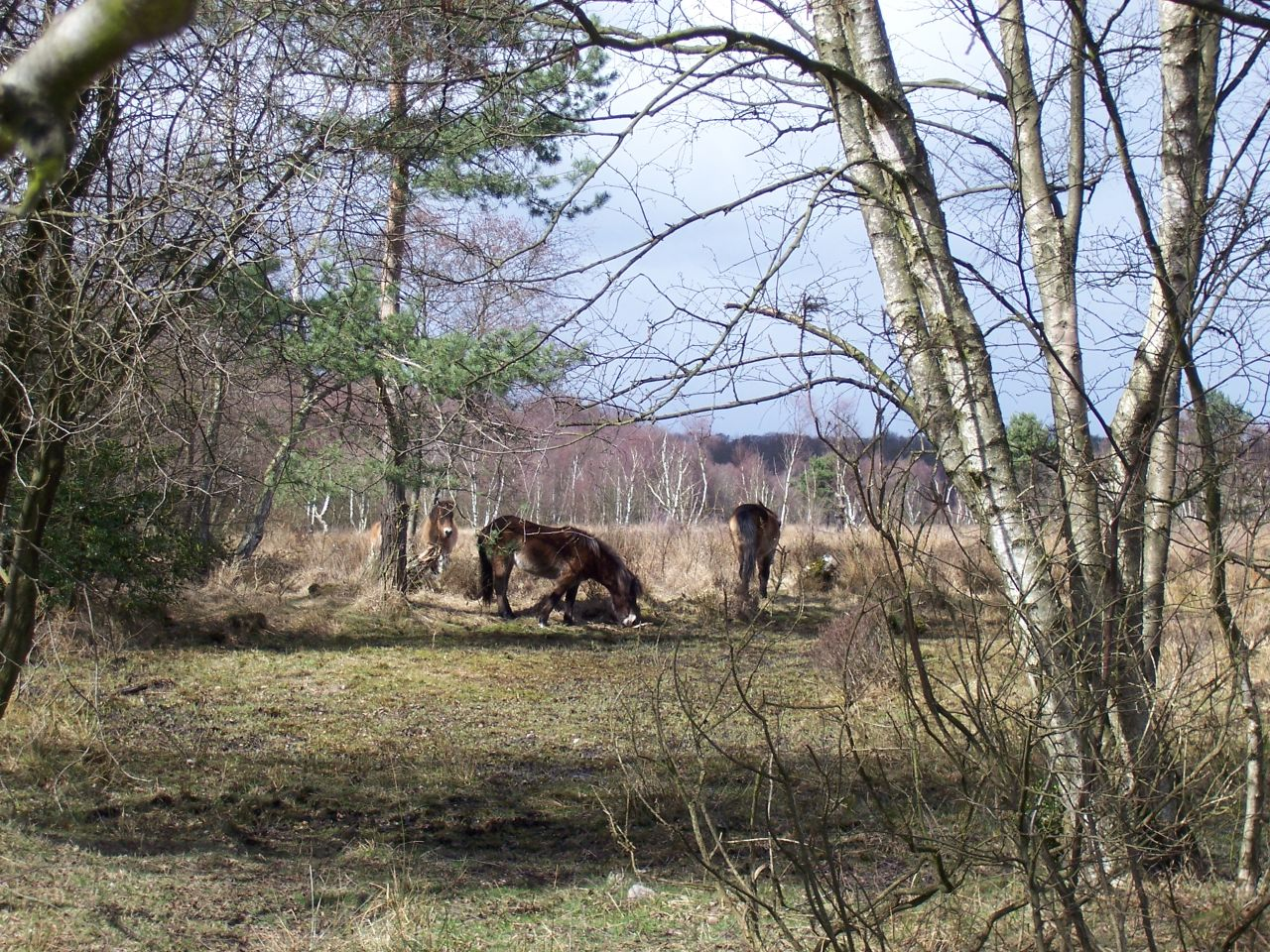
Exmoor ponies running free at Sutton Park

In 1997, English Nature designated most of Sutton Park a national nature reserve and it features on English Heritage's list of recognised historic parks and gardens. In July 2005, a 20-year 'Keepers of Time' scheme was announced, which will eliminate alien species from ancient woodlands and restore native varieties like oak, ash and beech.

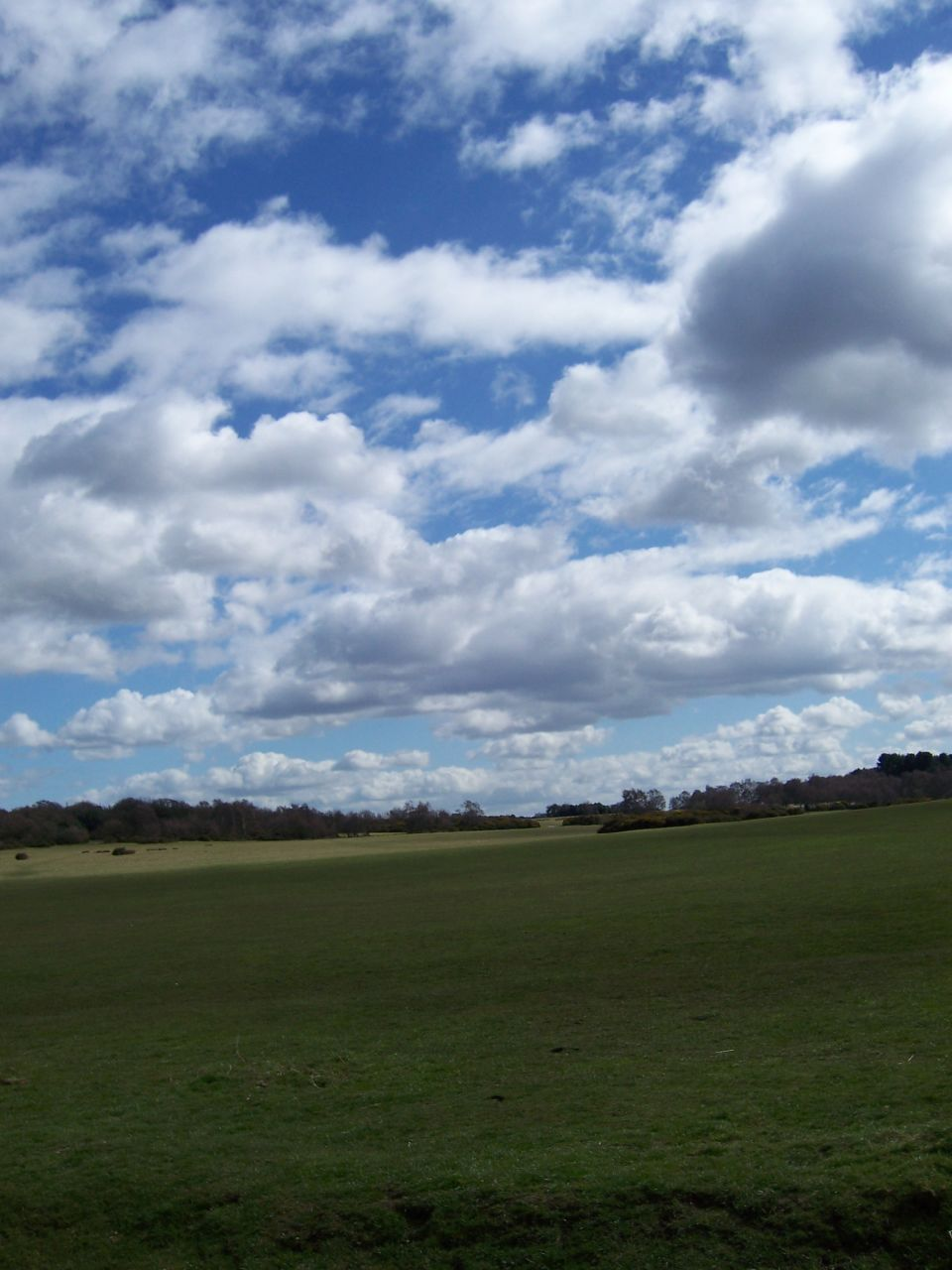
Open field at Sutton Park

The park is currently managed by Birmingham City Council; but in July 2004 it was announced that control would be devolved to the local councillors for Sutton Coldfield.

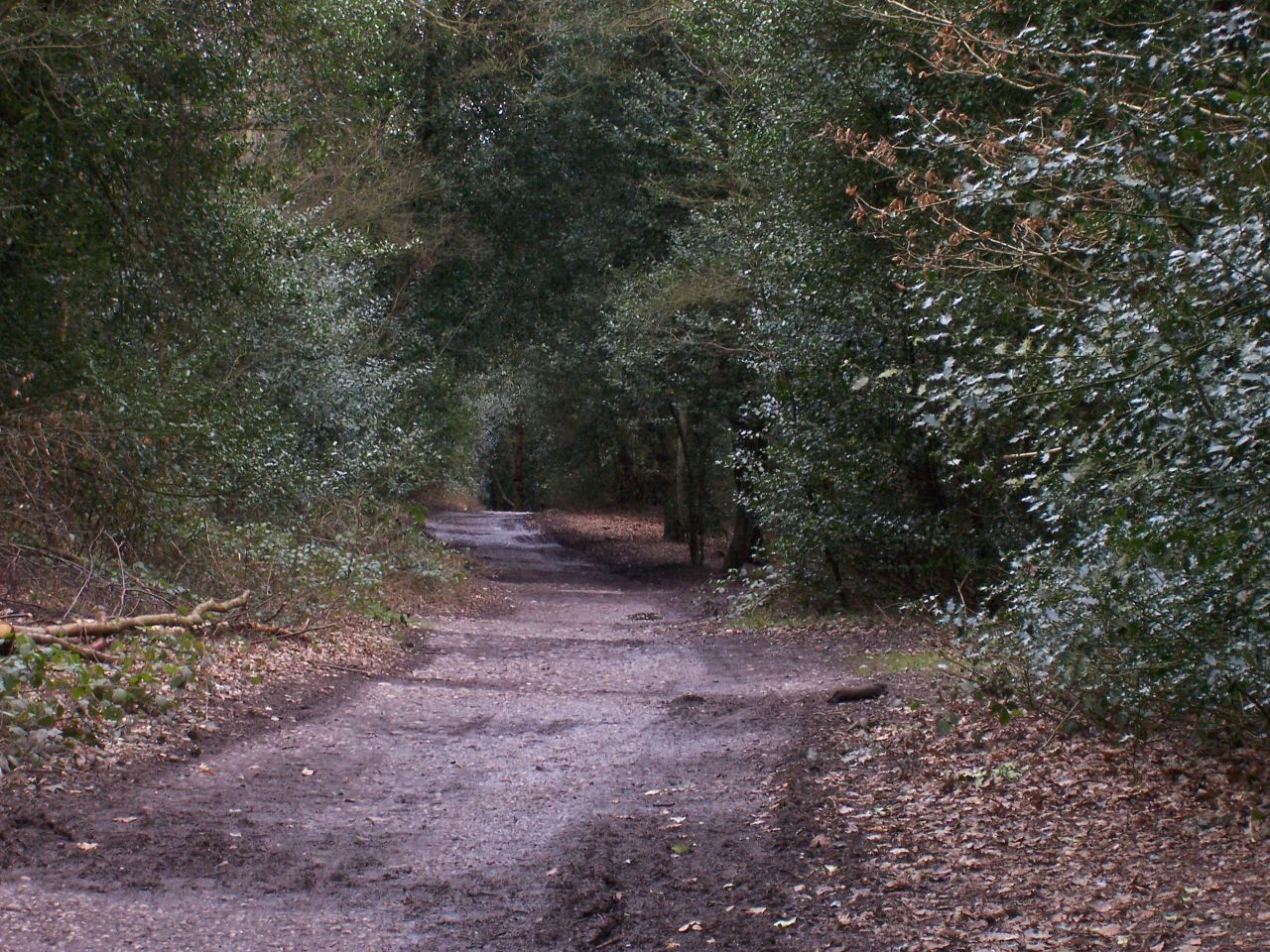
A 'path' through the woods

The roads have reverted to their previous 'heavily restricted' status. There is still considerable car traffic into and out of the park, mainly of families with children, dog walkers, kite/model aeroplane fliers and other recreational use. However, cross-park 'through traffic' is now completely blocked by sturdy gates across the main link roads, similar to the existing gates at all road entrances and exits, that open and close with dusk and dawn. This measure has significantly reduced the use of the park as a rush-hour short-cut (notably between Boldmere and Streetly), with some noticeable impact on congestion of local routes around the Park. The benefit of traffic restriction is improvement in the enjoyability of the park; with cleaner air, safer roads for walkers and cyclists, and much reduced visual and noise pollution, plus reduced wear and tear on the poorly maintained, decaying road surfaces.

Road speed limits through the park have been reduced twice, from 30 mph to 20 mph in the 1980s, and to 5 mph in 2004. Also, on the pedestrianised areas (areas that used to be roads for cars, but are now closed to vehicles, except for emergency/ranger traffic), many speed bumps have been removed.

The commercial funfair for small children beside Powell's Pool continues to operate, attracting significant business. It offers rides such as a daisy-chained go-kart track ride (with 'spooky' tunnels), and a two-person manually operated bell-rope pirate ship swings.

There is a Sea Cadets dry-dock training vessel ("the Concrete Corvette") at Boldmere Gate along with the headquarters of the 1st Sutton Coldfield Sea Scouts, and at the other side of the park the 9th Sutton Coldfield Scouts.

In December 2007, the National Cycle Network won £50-million in a public vote. The effect on Sutton Park will be to build the Plants Brook route that will create a free off-road bicycle path from east Erdington to Sutton Park.

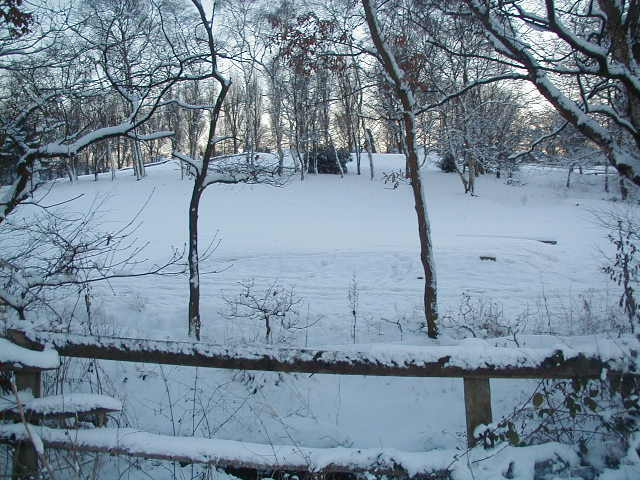
Part of the golf course in winter

In February 2008, a City Council feasibility study examined the possibility of once again running passenger trains through the park.

In September 2012, an outbreak of E. coli O157 was confirmed by the Health Protection Agency. Seven people were infected during the months of July and August. The park remained open but Birmingham City Council advised children under 10 to avoid visiting Sutton Park and for visitors to avoid contact with animals and wash hands thoroughly. Due to the outbreak, the autumn Midlands Counties and English National Road Relays running events in 2012 were cancelled.
