= Sutton Park railway station =

Former railway station in England

Sutton Park
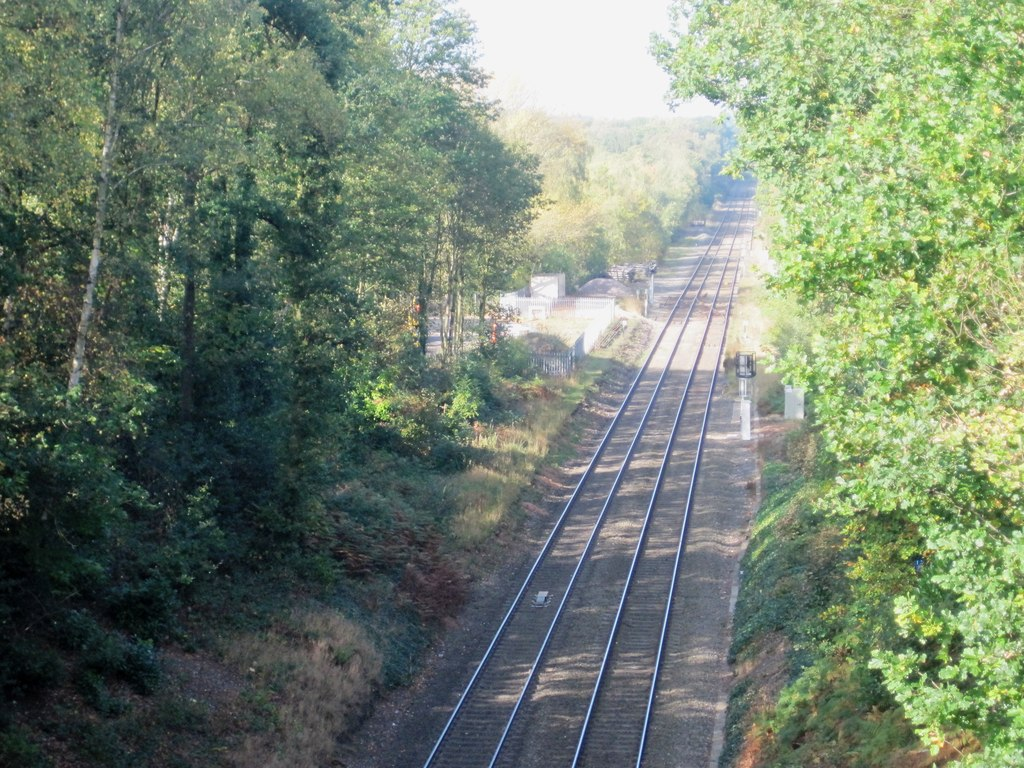
- The site of the station in 2011

General information
- Location: Sutton Coldfield, Birmingham; England
- Coordinates: 52.5683°N 1.8273°W
- Grid reference: SP118967
- Platforms: 3

Other information
- Status: Disused

History
- Original company: Midland Railway
- Pre-grouping: Midland Railway
- Post-grouping: London, Midland and Scottish Railway

Key dates
- 1 July 1879: Opened
- 18 January 1965: Closed
Location

Sutton Park railway station was a railway station in Sutton Coldfield, Warwickshire, (in Birmingham since 1974), England, on the Midland Railway's Sutton Park Line.

== History ==
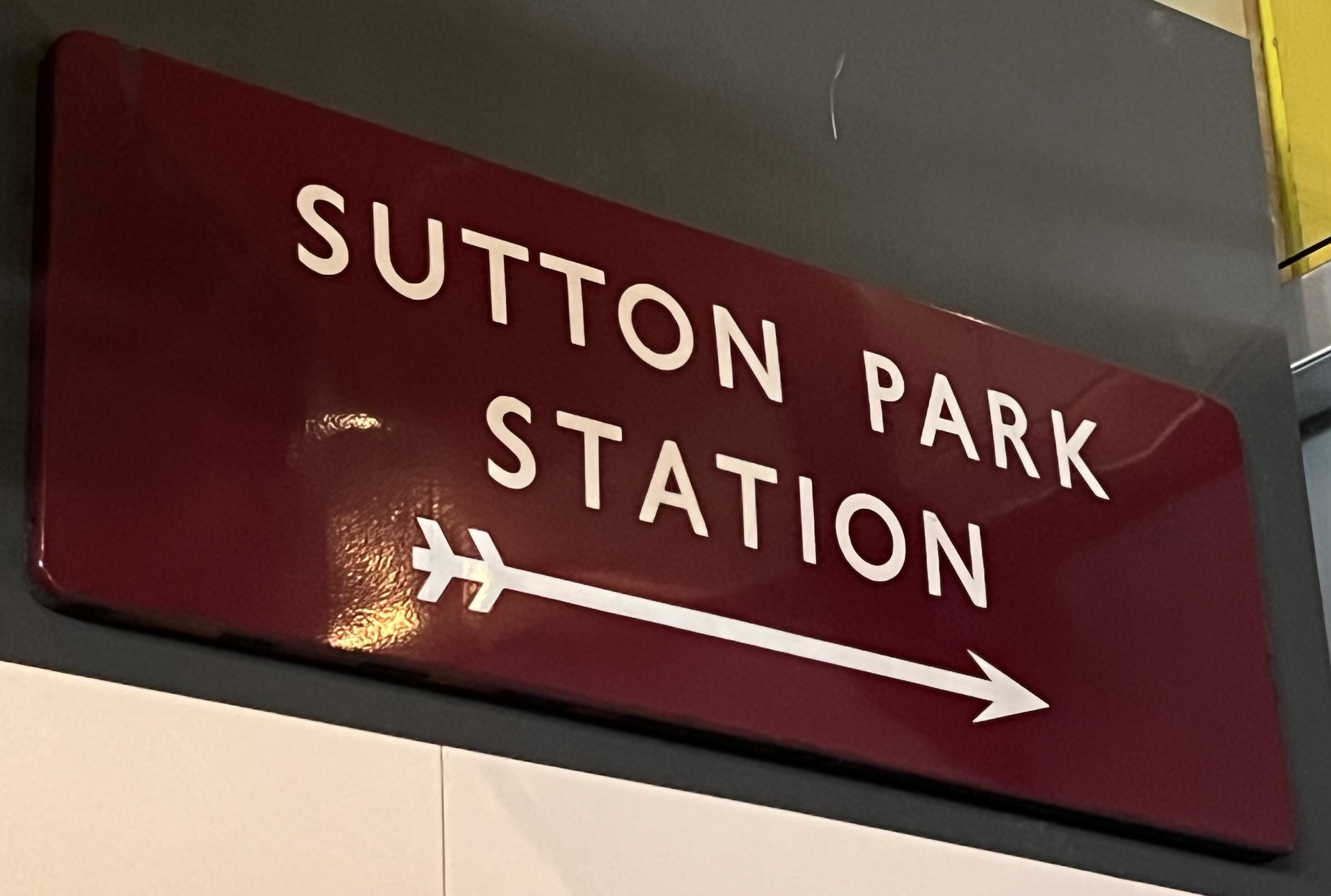
British Railways-era station sign in the collection at Thinktank, Birmingham Science Museum

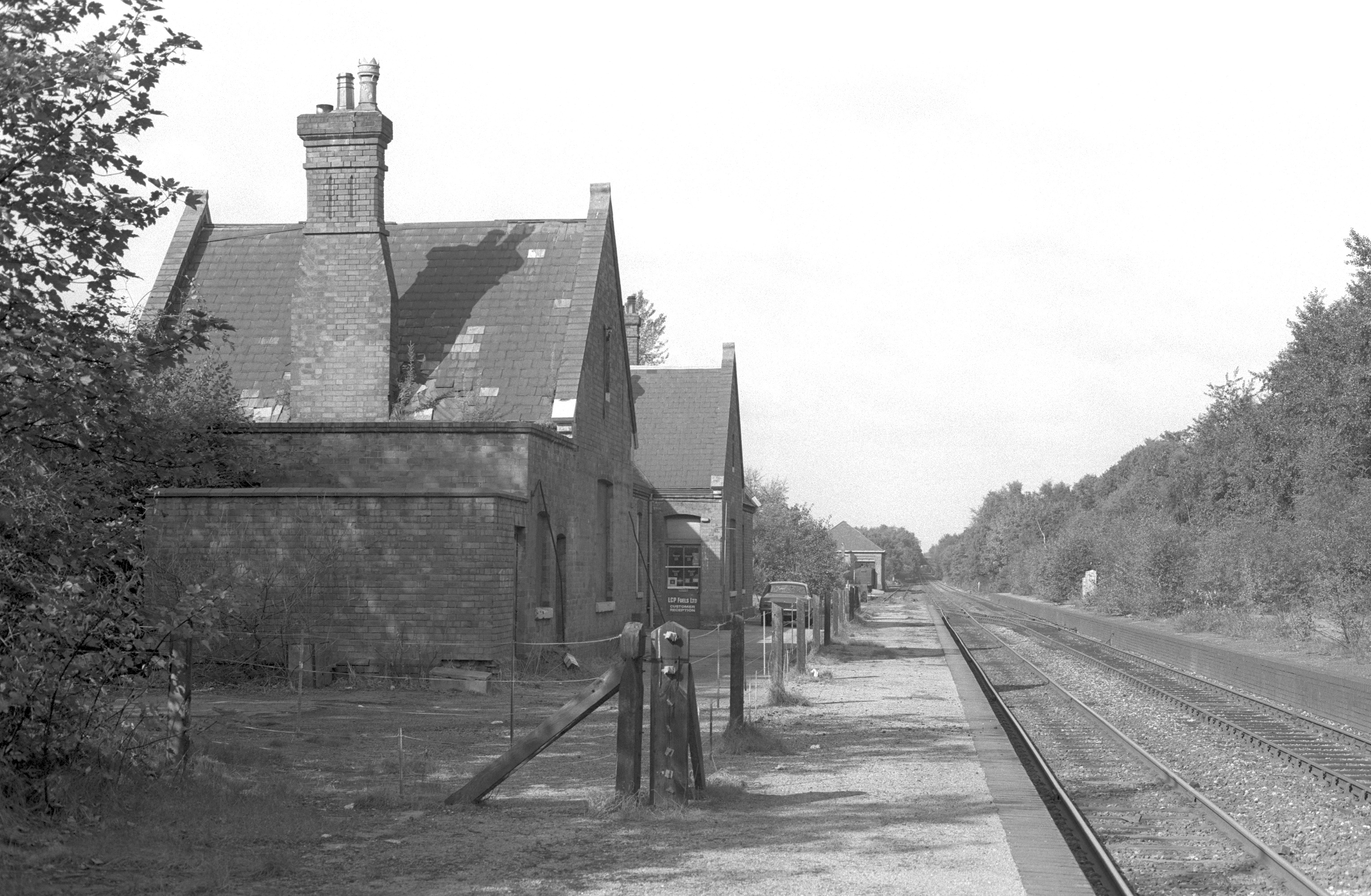
Sutton Park railway station 2 October 1980

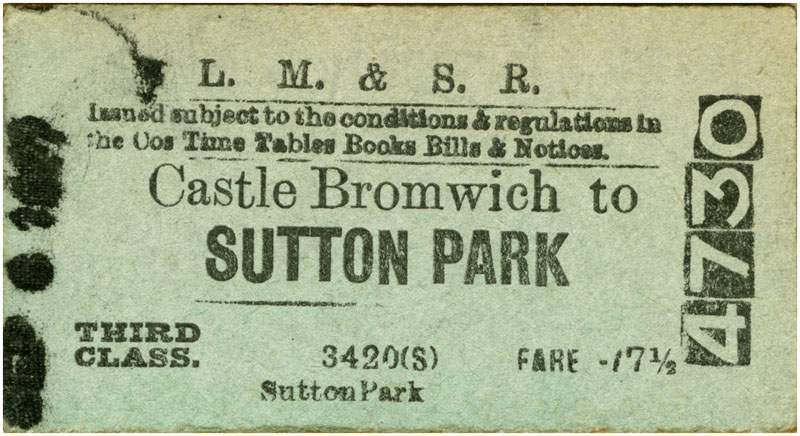
An LMS railway ticket from Castle Bromwich to Sutton Park

The station opened in 1879.

Overnight on 24-25 February 1942, King George VI and Queen Elizabeth stayed on the Royal Train which was parked behind the signal box. Later in 1942 a United States Army Post Office was established next to the station. In May 1948 in that disused sorting office adjacent to the station, 90 people began sorting 150 tons of parcels from America. It was the opening of the new Midland Customers depot, aimed at relieving congestion at the ports. Excise and postal officials examined the contents of parcels. In September 1962 the depot was the subject of a bungled robbery. Thieves stole 2,000 cigarettes worth £32 from the Post Office canteen but missed a much larger haul in a nearby locked room.

In 1959, the station hosted the Guards and Shunters School, and in 1961 a Signalling School for both men and women was established on the site.

The station closed to passengers in 1965. Goods facilities had closed earlier on 7 December 1964 but the goods shed was taken over for use beyond this date by the adjacent Post Office parcels depot. The line remains open for freight trains and occasionally steam specials and diverted passenger workings.

Preceding station	Disused railways	Following station
Sutton Coldfield Town; Line and station closed	Midland Railway; Sutton Park Line	Streetly; Line and station closed
