= Sutton Park line =

Railway line in the UK

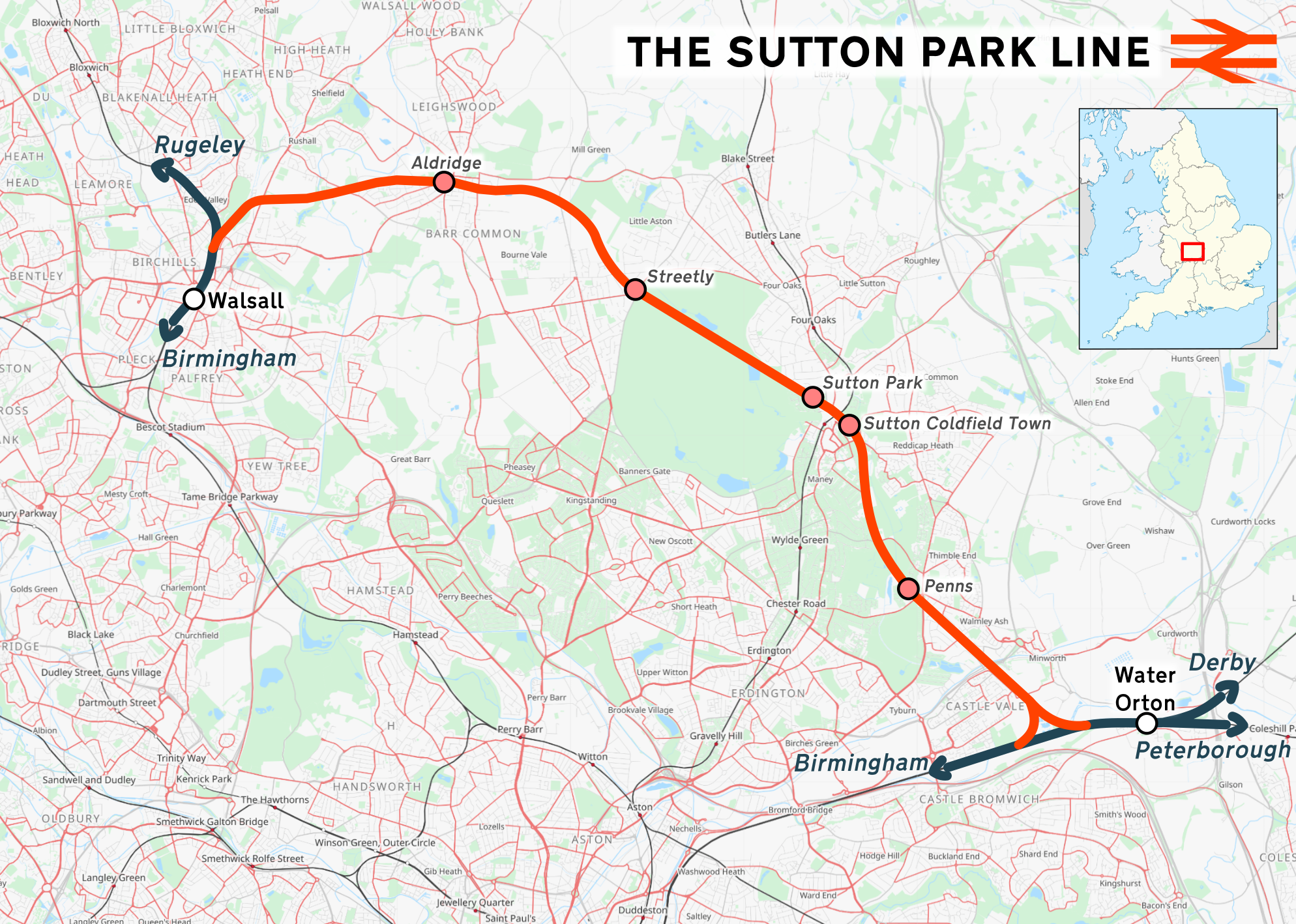
Route map (Click to enlarge)

The Sutton Park line is a freight-only railway line running from Walsall to Castle Bromwich and Water Orton in the West Midlands, England. It is an important and strategic route, as it enables most freight trains to avoid congestion at Birmingham New Street station. It gets its name as it runs through Sutton Park at Sutton Coldfield, West Midlands.

Opened in 1879 as one of the Midland Railway branches around Walsall, the line carried passenger services until 1965.

== Construction and opening ==
The line was constructed by the Wolverhampton, Walsall and Midland Junction Railway company, and was authorised on 6 August 1872. In 1874, the company merged with the Midland Railway.

The line was opened on 1 July 1879, and was served by trains between Wolverhampton High Level and Birmingham New Street via Walsall, although some services avoided Walsall via the direct link to the Wolverhampton and Walsall Railway.

== Brownhills branch ==
The Brownhills branch was authorised in two stages. Stage One was from Aldridge to Walsall Wood in 1876, and from Walsall Wood to Norton Canes in 1880.

It was opened for goods traffic between Aldridge and Brownhills Watling Street in April 1882, and the entire route followed in November 1882. Passenger services on the line began in 1884, although services terminated at Brownhills.

The branch was constructed mostly for the purpose of carrying coal traffic from five local pits. This output was sufficient to ensure that the route was double-track throughout.

Passenger trains were withdrawn on the line in 1930, and the branch closed completely in 1962.

== Closure ==
The line was closed for passenger services on 18 January 1965, although mail trains continued to call at Sutton Park after this date.

== Re-opening ==
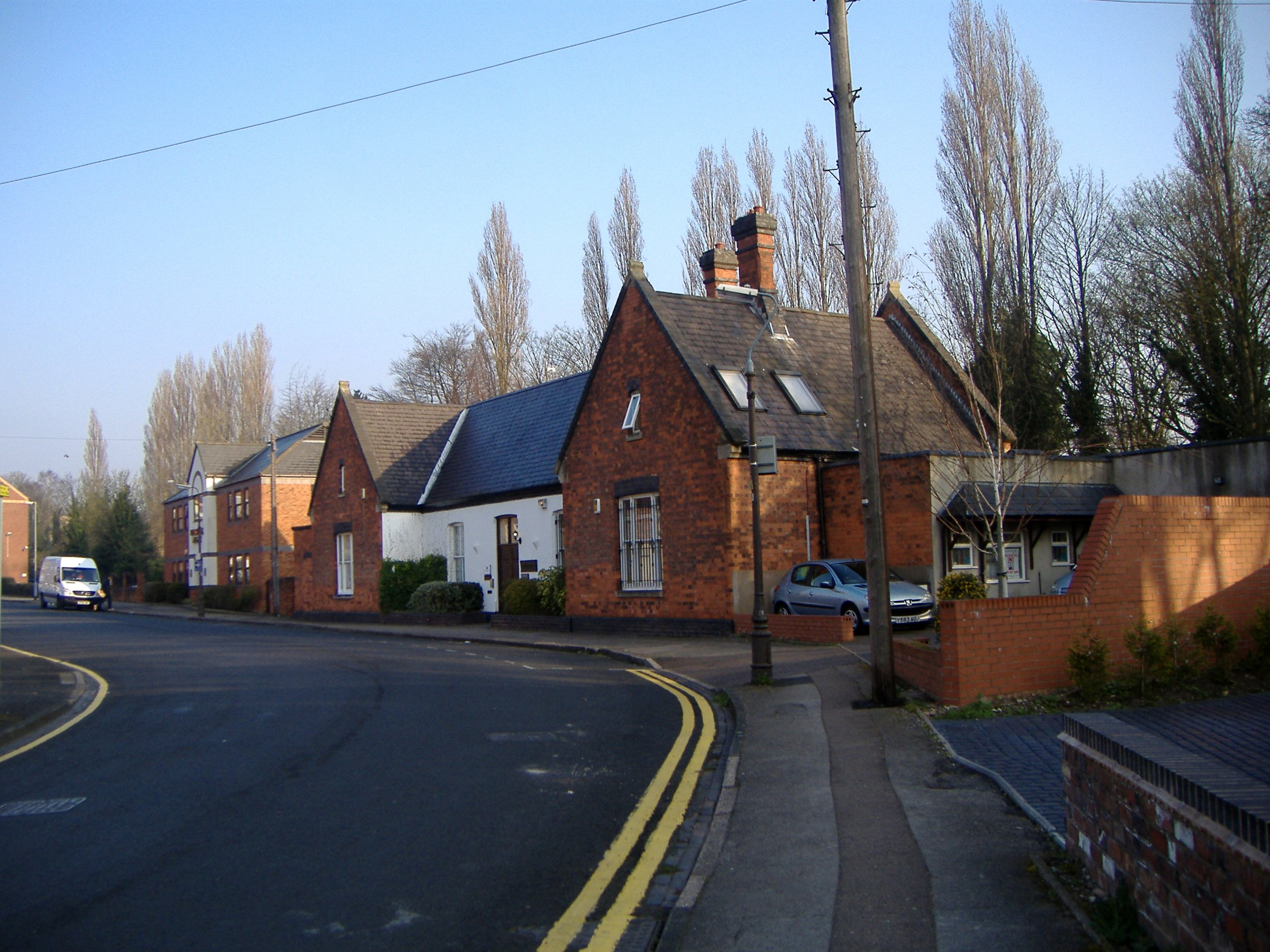
The currently disused Sutton Town railway station, which was opened in 1879 and closed in 1924, on Midland Drive. The station has been converted into offices.

In February 2008 it was announced that Birmingham City Council, Network Rail and Centro were launching a feasibility study to assess the possibility of re-opening the line to passenger services. In January 2015 the line was put on hold for reopening to passenger trains.

In March 2020, a bid was made to the Restoring Your Railway fund to get funds for a feasibility study into reinstating the line. This bid was unsuccessful.

In February 2021 it was announced that land had been purchased in Aldridge near the site of its former railway station as part of plans led by Mayor of the West Midlands Andy Street and Aldridge-Brownhills MP Wendy Morton to reopen at least part of the line.

Under plans submitted to the DfT, new open access operator Wrexham, Shropshire and Midlands Railway (WSMR) would use the line to access Coleshill Parkway on their service between Wrexham and London. This service would replace the Avanti service withdrawn in June 2024.
