= Laurence Nowell =

English antiquarian

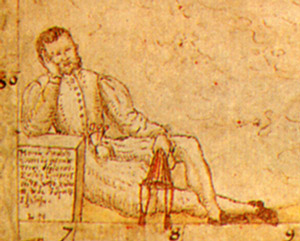
Nowell's self-portrait with an empty purse, from the lower left corner of the pocket map he prepared for William Cecil

Laurence (or Lawrence) Nowell (1530 – c. 1570) was an English antiquarian, cartographer and pioneering scholar of the Old English language and literature.

== Life ==
Laurence Nowell was born in 1530 in Whalley, Lancashire, the second son of Alexander Nowell of Read Hall and Grace Catterall of Great Mitton, Lancashire. He may have started school at Whalley Abbey and sometime later may have attended Westminster School, where his cousin Alexander Nowell was a master from 1543 on, until in 1549 he attended Christ Church, Oxford, where he received an M.A. in 1552. He travelled to Paris, in 1553, then to Rouen, Antwerp, Louvain, Geneva, Venice, Padua and Rome by 1557/58. Another round of extensive travelling ensued, this time around England, Ireland and perhaps Wales, in the company of William Lambarde, during and/or after which he gathered information on Old English manuscripts and English place-names.

By 1563, he was living in the London house of his patron, Sir William Cecil. Nowell had been made the tutor of Cecil's ward, Edward de Vere, the seventeenth Earl of Oxford.

Nowell devoted much effort in the 1560s to a large-scale atlas of Anglo-Saxon Britain, though he never completed the work. For Cecil, he made the first accurate cartographic survey of the east coast of Ireland, as well as presenting him, in 1563/64, with a small, accurate pocket-sized map of Britain, entitled A General Description of England and Ireland with the Costes Adioyning which Cecil supposedly always carried with him.

Nowell also collected and transcribed Old English documents and compiled the first Old English dictionary, the Vocabularium Saxonicum. In 1563, he came into possession of the only extant manuscript of Beowulf. The manuscript is bound in what is still known as the Nowell Codex (Cotton Vitellius A. xv). He also studied the Exeter Book, annotating folios 9r and 10r amongst others.

In 1568 Lambarde, with Nowell's encouragement, published a collection of Anglo-Saxon laws, Archaionomia, which was printed by John Day. In the introduction he acknowledges Nowell's contribution. This publication included a woodcut map depicting the seven kingdoms of Anglo-Saxon England, which is thought to be the first map of any sort ("Lambardes map") to have been designed, printed and published in England, and which is very likely to have been the work of Nowell.

Nowell, probably realising that he was not going to be given the preferment he sought from Cecil, decided to visit the Continent to study (and possibly to become a diplomat) in 1568, and died there between 1570 and 1572. His books and manuscripts passed into the possession of William Lambarde.

Shannon makes the claim that Nowell had "a butterfly mind", and fell into the scholar's trap of rarely finishing a project or publishing anything. Despite this, he also makes the claim that "Nowell was a pioneer in the Anglo-Saxon language, in place-name studies, and in map-making, and that he can be claimed with justification to have single-handedly invented the idea of historical cartography."

== Identification ==
Two 16th-century English cousins, one an antiquarian and the other a churchman, were named Laurence Nowell. Their biographies were confused by Anthony Wood in his Historia et antiquitates Universitatis Oxoniensis (1674) and Athenae Oxonienses (1691), and the error persisted through later studies, including the Dictionary of National Biography (1895), and into the twentieth century. In 1974, however, Retha Warnicke's analysis of a 1571 court case made it clear that there were two different Laurence Nowells, and their biographies have since been partially disentangled. A Laurence Nowell appointed master of Sutton Coldfield grammar school in 1546 was almost certainly the churchman; while a Laurence Nowell who sat in parliament for the borough of Knaresborough in 1559 has been tentatively identified, but without any firm evidence, as the antiquary.

== Sources ==
- Berkhout, Carl T. (1985). "The pedigree of Laurence Nowell the antiquary". English Language Notes. 23 (2): 15–26.
- Berkhout, Carl T. (1998). "Laurence Nowell (1530–ca.1570)". In Damico, Helen (ed.). Medieval Scholarship: biographical studies on the formation of a discipline: Vol. 2: Literature and Philology. New York: Garland. pp. 3–17. ISBN 0815328907.
- Black, Pamela M. (1982). "Some new light on the career of Laurence Nowell the antiquary". Antiquaries Journal. 62: 116–123.
- Brackmann, Rebecca (2012). The Elizabethan Invention of Anglo-Saxon England: Laurence Nowell, William Lambarde, and the study of Old English. Woodbridge: D.S. Brewer. ISBN 9781843843184.
- Flower, Robin (1935). "Laurence Nowell and the discovery of England in Tudor times". Proceedings of the British Academy. 21: 47–73.
- Grant, Raymond (1996). Laurence Nowell, William Lambarde and the Laws of the Anglo-Saxons. Amsterdam: Rodopi. ISBN 9042000767.
- Hahn, Thomas (1983). "The identity of the antiquary Laurence Nowell". English Language Notes. 20 (3/4): 10–18.
- Harris, Oliver D. (2022). "The Laurence Nowell enigma: the enquiries of Anthony Wood". Notes and Queries. 69 (3): 234–238.
- Hill, David (2004). "Laurence Nowell, Cartographer, Linguist, Archivist and Spy, and his Anglo-Saxon Atlas of 1563." Paper read before the Society of Antiquaries of London, 12 February 2004.
- Lazarus, Micha (2024). "Laurence Nowell, schoolmaster of Sutton Coldfield". Notes and Queries. 71 (1): 25–29.
- McConica, James, ed. (1986). The History of the University of Oxford, Vol. III: The Collegiate University. Oxford: Clarendon Press.
- Shannon, William D. (2014). "Laurence Nowell of Read Hall, Lancashire (c.1530-c.1569): lexicographer, toponoymist, cartographer, enigma". In Stringer, Keith J. (ed.). North-West England from the Romans to the Tudors: essays in memory of John Macnair Todd. Extra series. Vol. 41. Carlisle: Cumberland and Westmorland Antiquarian and Archaeological Society. pp. xviii, 201–33, 288. ISBN 9781873124659.
- Warnicke, Retha (1974). "Note on a Court of Requests case of 1571". English Language Notes. 11: 250–56.
- Warnicke, Retha (2008) [2004]. "Nowell, Laurence (1530–c.1570)". Oxford Dictionary of National Biography (online ed.). Oxford University Press. doi:10.1093/ref:odnb/69731. (Subscription, Wikipedia Library access or UK public library membership required.)
