= St James' Church, Birmingham =

St James' Church, Birmingham may refer to:

- St James' Church, Edgbaston
- St James' Church, Handsworth
- St James' Church, Mere Green
