= Roughley =

Ward in Sutton Coldfield, Birmingham, England

Coordinates: 52.5946°N 1.8017°W

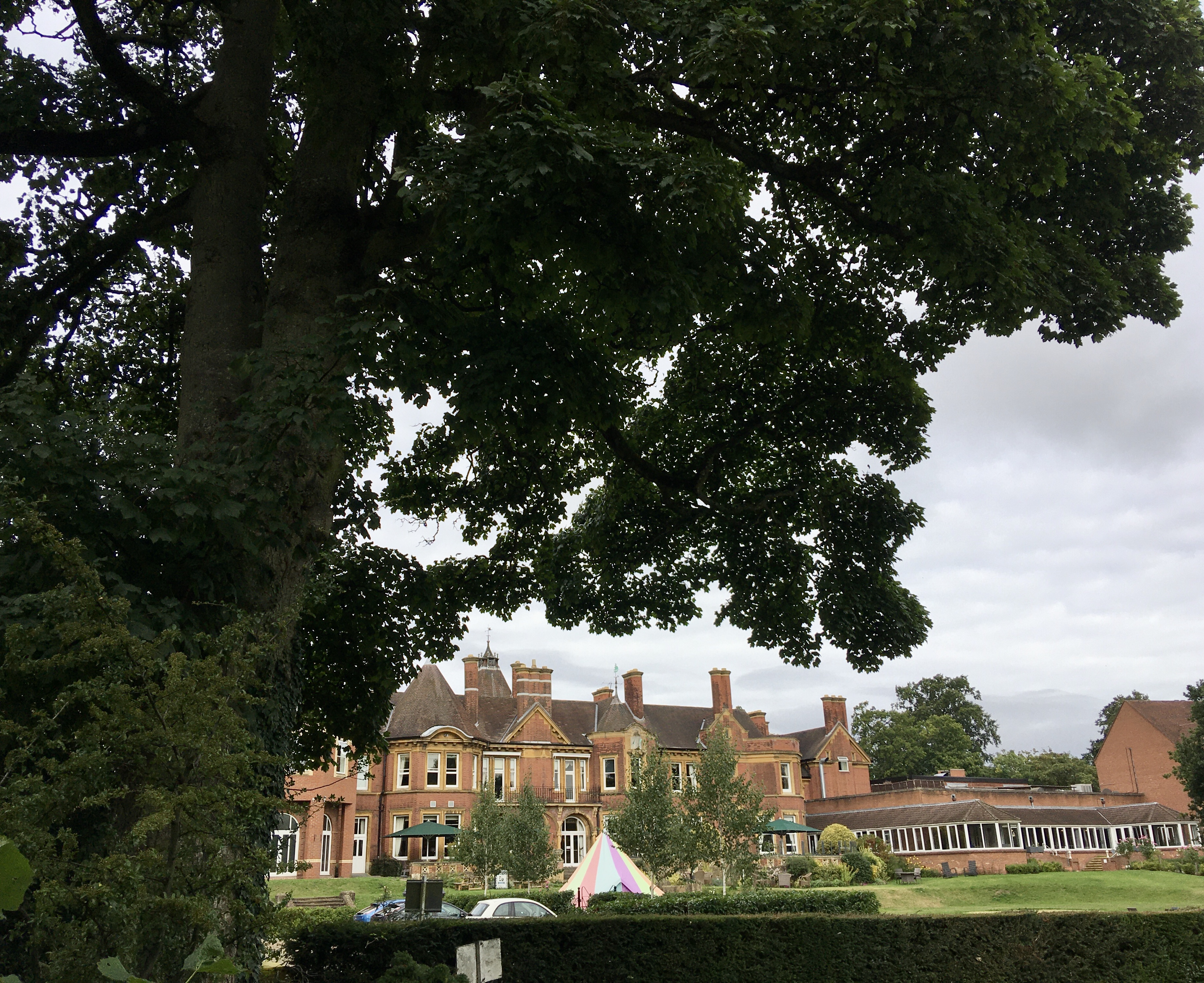
- Moor Hall, located in Roughley Ward

- Location within the West Midlands
- Population: 11,959 (2021 Census)
- OS grid reference: SP125990
- Civil parish: Sutton Coldfield
- Metropolitan borough: Birmingham
- Metropolitan county: West Midlands
- Region: West Midlands
- Country: England
- Sovereign state: United Kingdom
- Post town: SUTTON COLDFIELD
- Postcode district: B75
- Dialling code: 0121
- Police: West Midlands
- Fire: West Midlands
- Ambulance: West Midlands
- UK Parliament: Sutton Coldfield

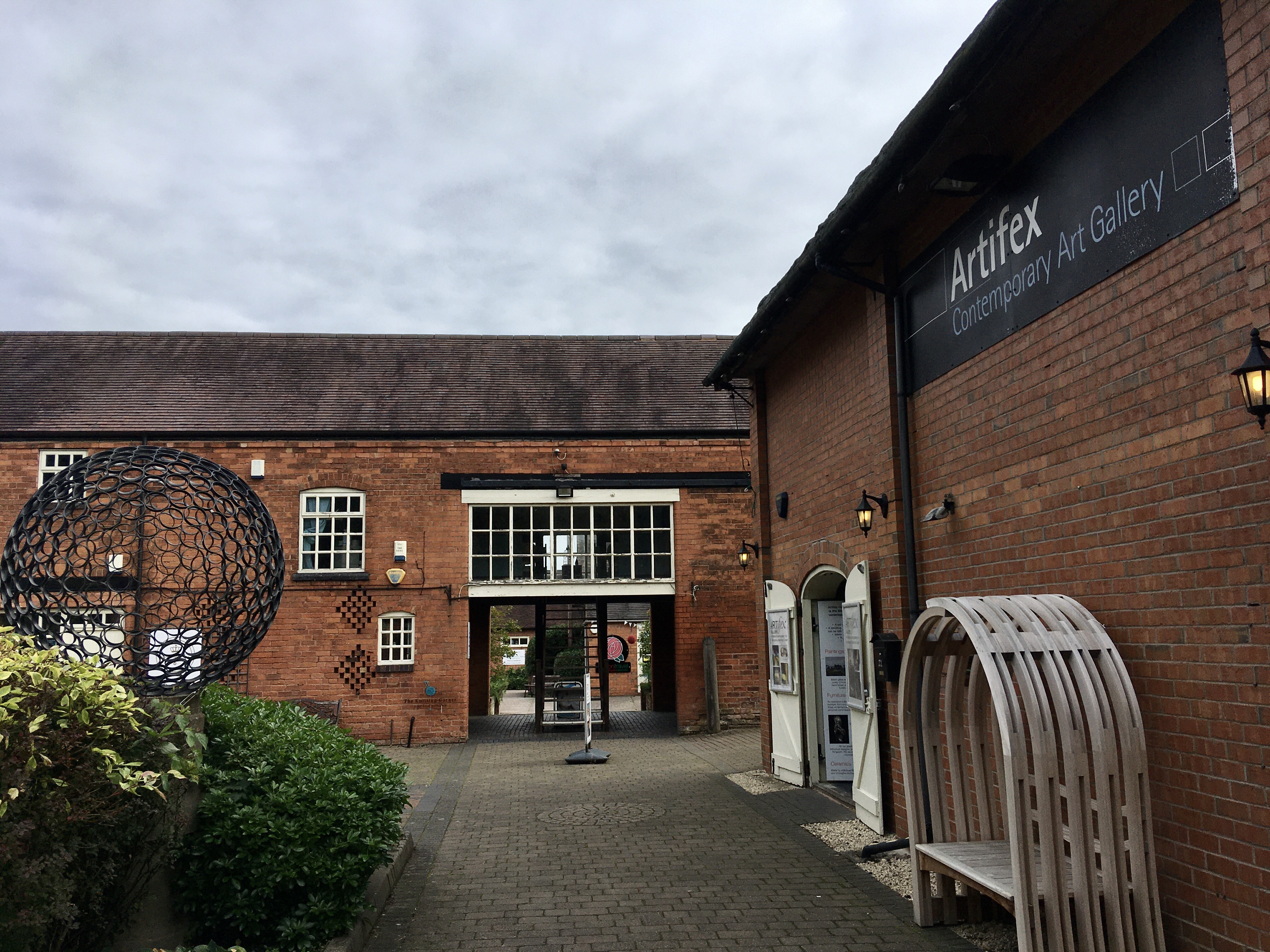
Mitchell Centre with independent shops, bistro and art gallery, in Roughley, Sutton Coldfield.

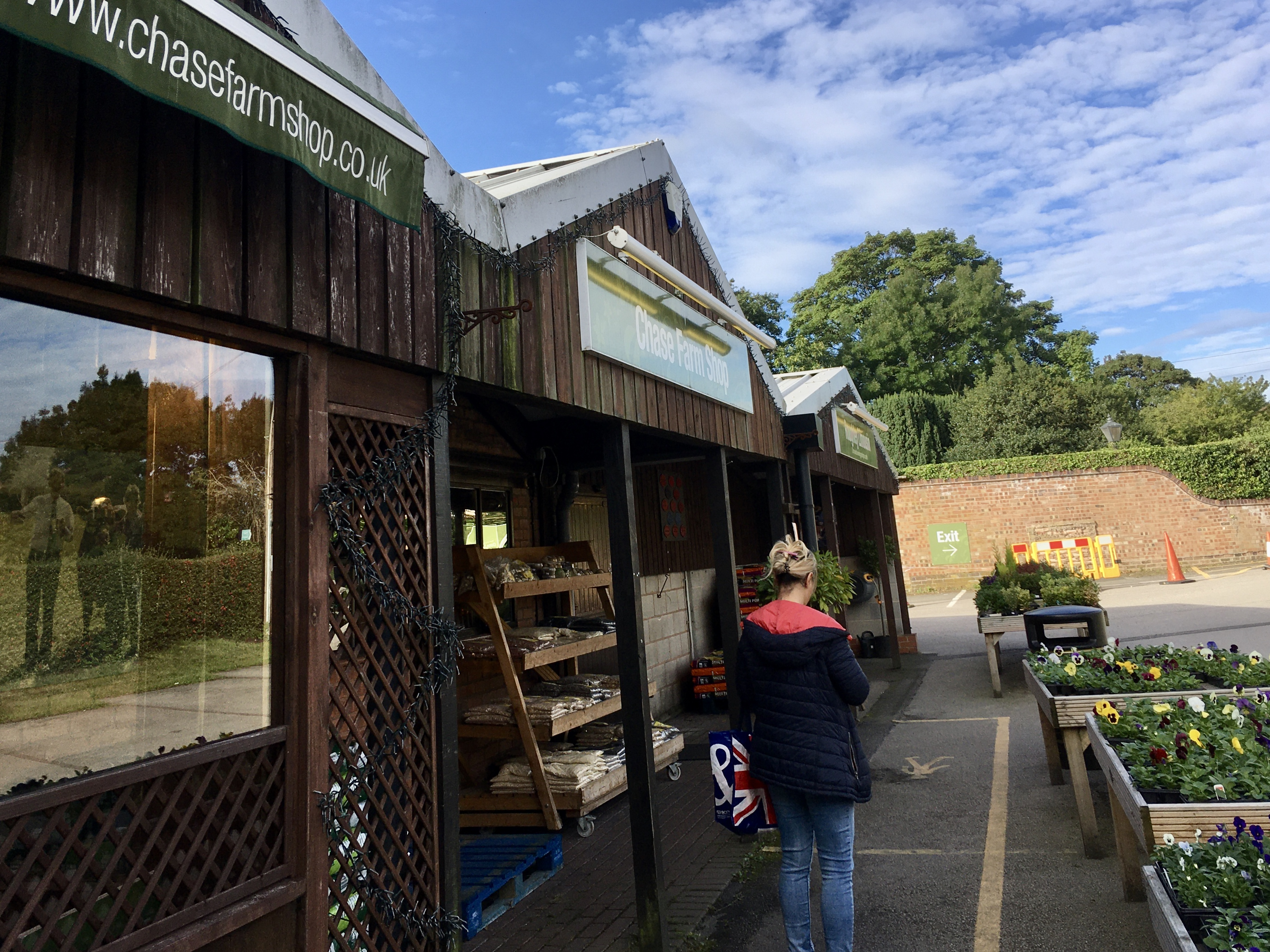
Chase Farm, Roughley, with a shop, cafe, and play facilities. Livestock includes the award-winning Roughley Limousin herd, goats and chickens. A family business linked to the renowned butcher and farmer, Walter Smith

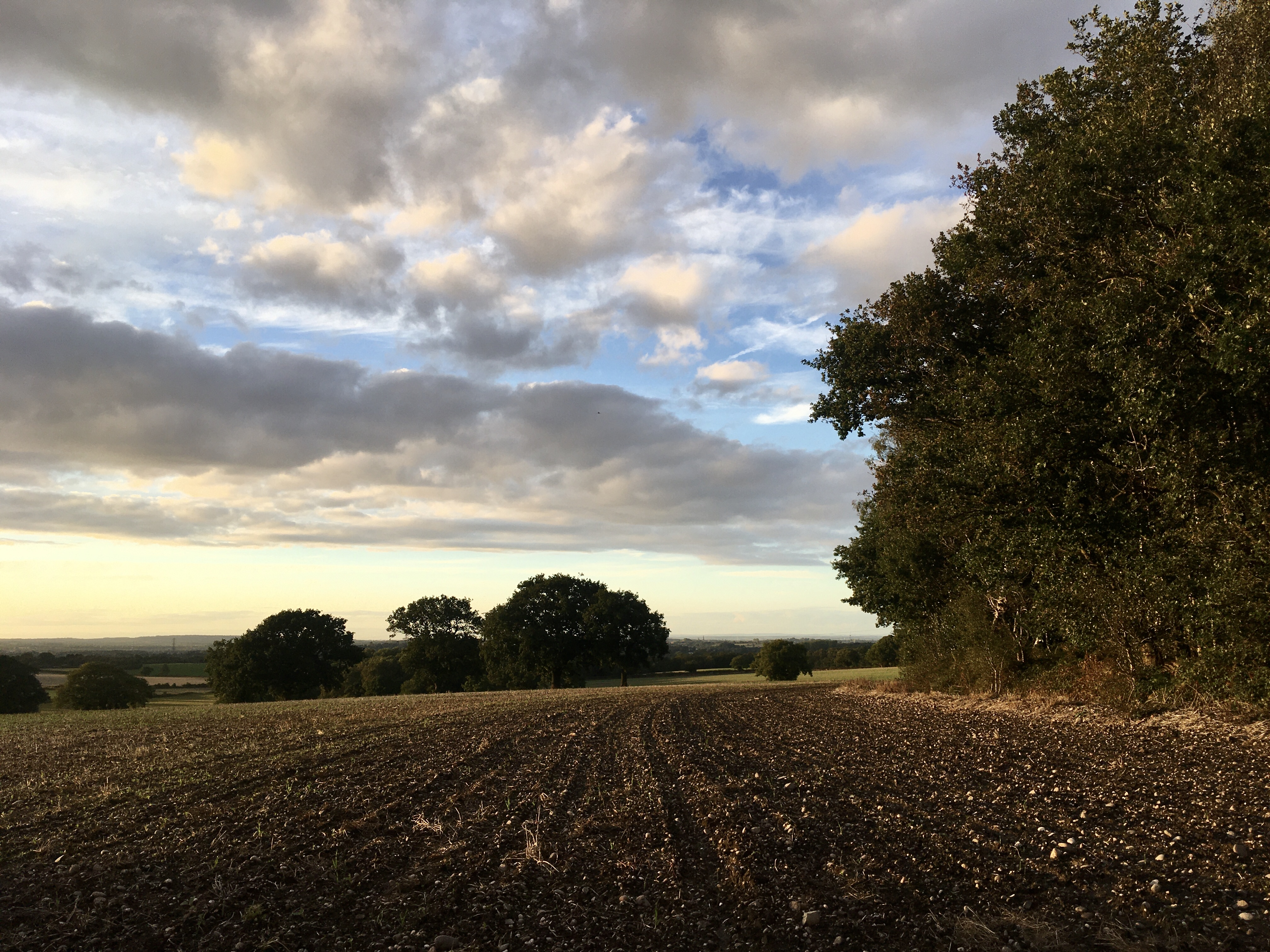
Looking towards Lichfield from Hillwood Road, Roughley.

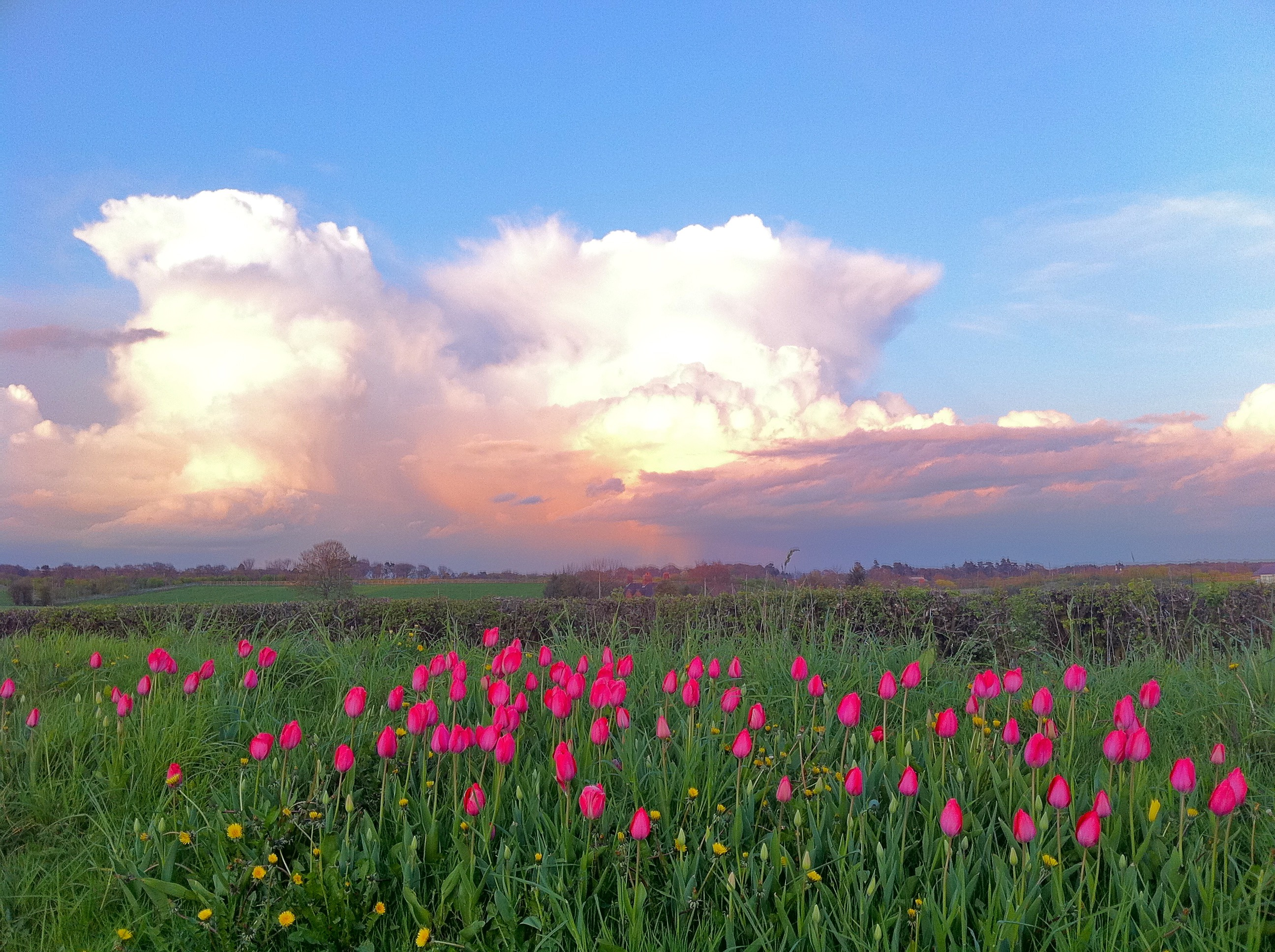
Dramatic sky over the fields of Roughley, Sutton Coldfield.

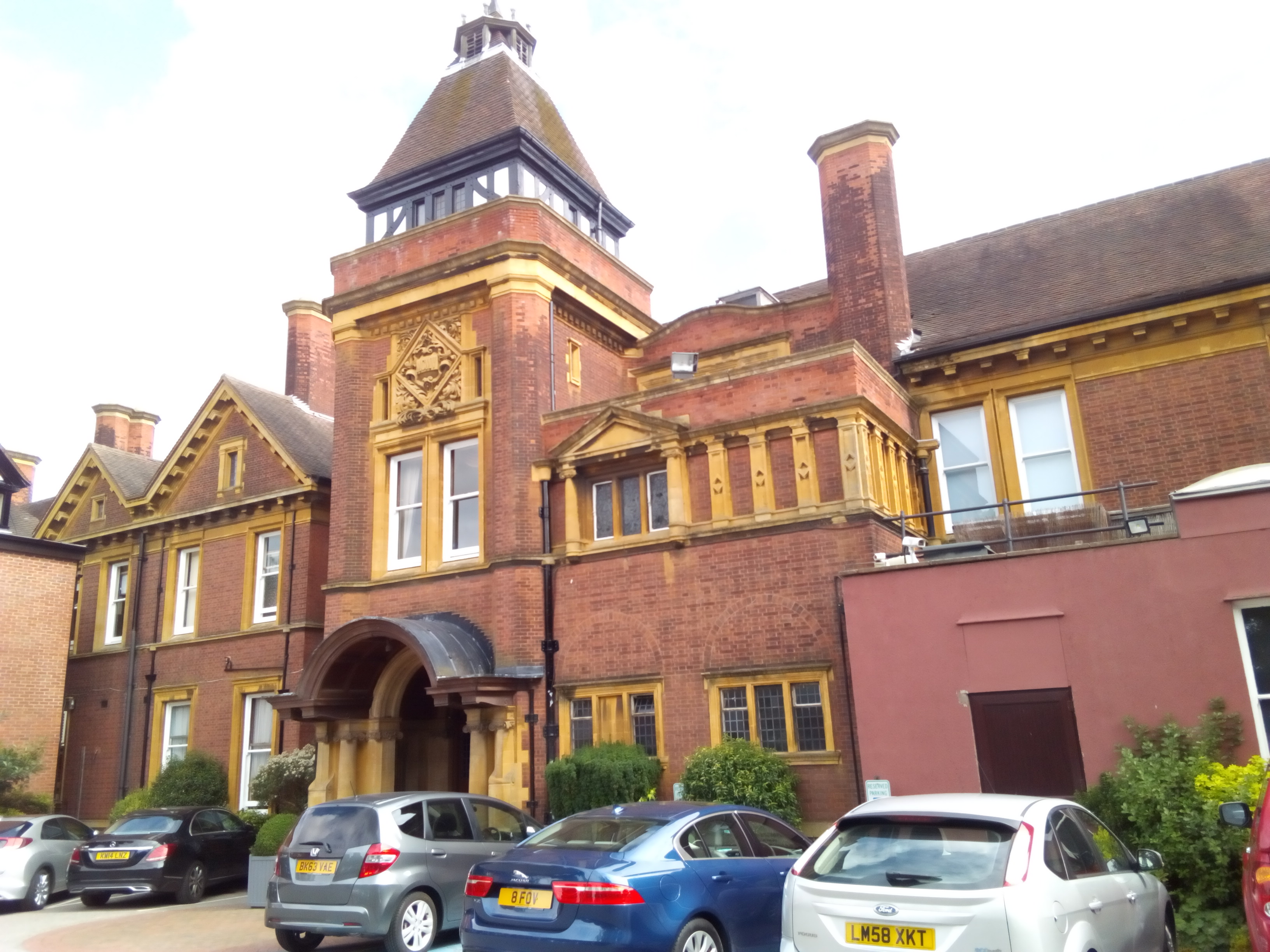
Moor Hall, Sutton Coldfield, within Roughley Ward, on the site of the former mansion built by Bishop Vesey in the sixteenth century for his own occupation.

Roughley is an affluent semi-rural residential area of Sutton Coldfield, Birmingham, in the West Midlands, England, located approximately 8 miles north-east of Birmingham city centre. Formerly a part of the wider Sutton Four Oaks ward, following changes to Birmingham City Council ward boundaries in 2018, it became a ward of its own called Sutton Roughley. It is the most northerly part of the administrative area covered by the Royal Sutton Coldfield Town Council and the City of Birmingham.

Over half of Roughley Ward is attractive Green Belt countryside, including arable and dairy farms, historic field boundaries survive with mature hedgerows and woodlands. Several public footpaths provide access to the countryside and the one linking Hillwood Road and Dale Farm provides distant views of Lichfield Cathedral and on a clear day the Pennine Hills.

Roughley was historically part of the county of Warwickshire, and has been part of the metropolitan borough of Birmingham and the West Midlands since 1974. It includes parts of the old parishes of Hill and Canwell, and before May 2018 most of the area was within Four Oaks Ward, before being formed as a ward of its own. Roughley is one of the most affluent areas of Birmingham, with the Sutton Roughley Ward ranked as the least deprived of the 69 wards of Birmingham in the 2019 Index of Deprivation data. The ward also had the highest employment rate out of the city's 69 wards.

Local facilities within Roughley include the Mitchell Centre with independent shops, an art gallery, and bistro, all in premises converted from agricultural buildings, and nearby is the Chase Farm Shop with links to the farmer and butcher, Walter Smith.

Roughley Ward includes the Moor Hall Estate, containing Moor Hall Farm House, (listed grade II*), dating from the late fourteenth century, which was the birthplace of John Vesey, Bishop of Exeter (born circa 1462), who became the great benefactor of Sutton Coldfield through his connections with King Henry VIII. The estate also includes Moor Hall Hotel upon the site of the former mansion built by John Vesey for his own occupation, and there is also a golf course and exclusive housing.

John Vesey built 51 stone houses for the people of Sutton Coldfield in the sixteenth century and surviving houses within Roughley Ward include Vesey Grange (grade II* listed), on Weeford Road, and Vesey Cottage, (grade II* listed), upon the land of Wheatmoor Farm, accessed off Withyhill Road.

Other notable buildings include Ashfurlong Hall, (grade II* listed), Tamworth Road, a manor house dating mainly from the late eighteenth century, but incorporating earlier sixteenth century buildings.

Roughley Ward includes the Harvest Fields development, built by Barratt Homes and Crest Nicholson at the start of the twenty-first century, with several hundred homes arranged around a small park containing a community centre and nursery school, together with an access to Little Sutton Primary School.

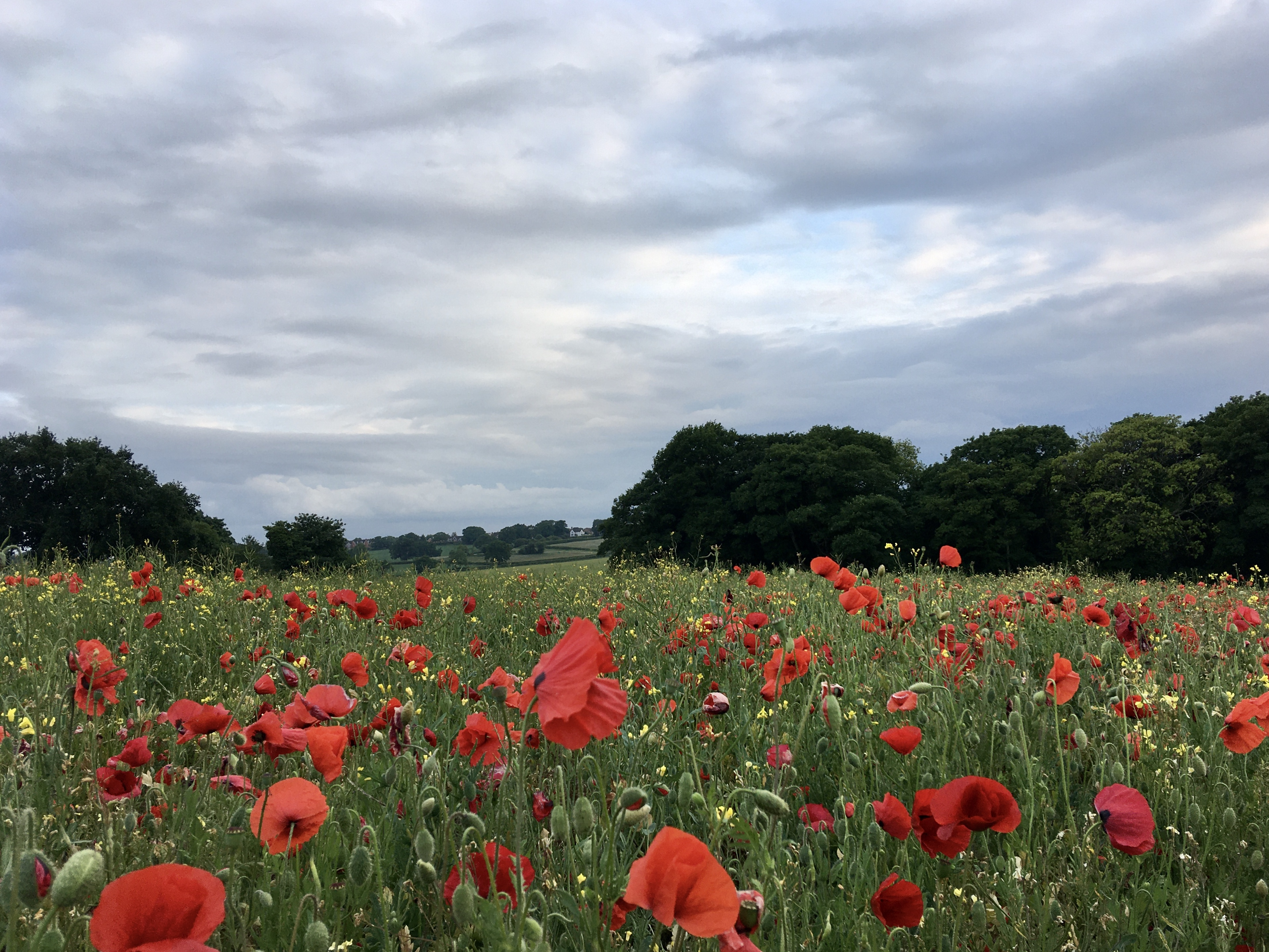
Poppy fields near Wheatmoor Farm, within the ward of Roughley, Sutton Coldfield

== Transport ==
The X5 bus route goes from Roughley-Birmingham every 30 minutes Mon - Sat daytime and every hour evenings and Sundays. The 78A, operating hourly Mon-Sat daytime between Sutton Coldfield, Mere Green and Kingstanding, stops at Little Sutton Road, which is within walking distance of Roughley. These services are operated by National Express West Midlands.

Four Oaks railway train station is approximately one mile from the Harvest Fields development in Roughley.

The M6 Toll Road and A38 run along the Eastern boundary of Roughley Ward.
