= Sutton Trinity (ward) =

Coordinates: 52.5619°N 1.8063°W

- Ward
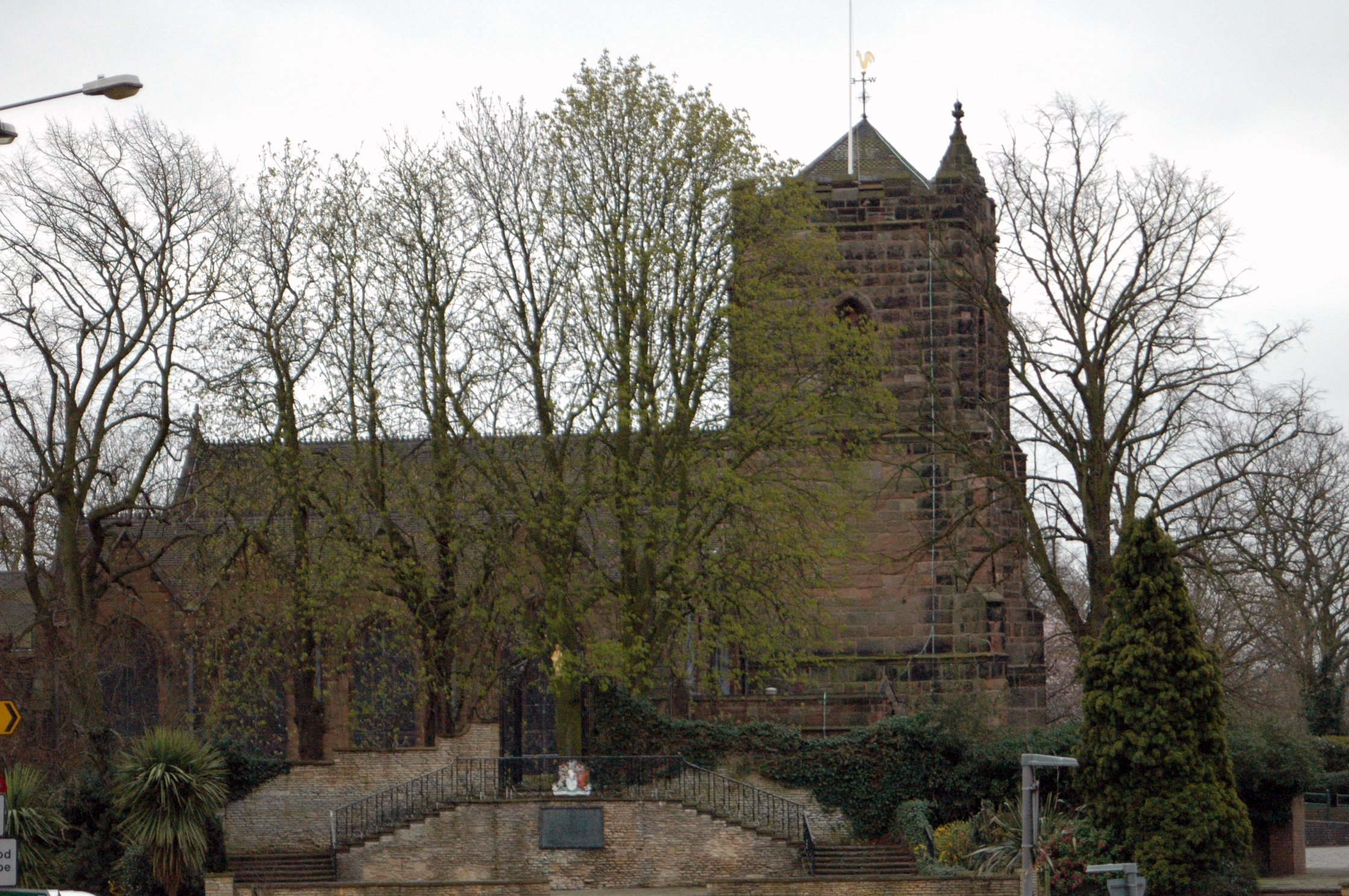
- Holy Trinity Church, north of Sutton town centre, from which the ward receives its name.

- Location within the West Midlands
- Area: 4.60 sq mi (11.9 km^{2})
- Population: 25,267 (2011.Ward)
  - Density: 5,493/sq mi (2,121/km^{2})
- OS grid reference: SP121958
- Metropolitan borough: Birmingham
- Metropolitan county: West Midlands
- Region: West Midlands
- Country: England
- Sovereign state: United Kingdom
- Post town: SUTTON COLDFIELD
- Postcode district: B72, B75
- Dialling code: 0121
- Police: West Midlands
- Fire: West Midlands
- Ambulance: West Midlands
- UK Parliament: Sutton Coldfield

Sutton Trinity is one of the 40 electoral wards in Birmingham, England. It is named after Holy Trinity Church, the town's parish church.

Sutton Trinity is one of four wards comprising the Parliamentary Constituency and formal district of Sutton Coldfield, Birmingham. It was created on 10 June 2004, following a Boundary Commission review of the city. It covers Sutton town centre and includes the neighbourhoods of Tudor Hill, Maney, New Hall Manor, Falcon Lodge, Whitehouse Common, Withy Hill, Little Sutton and Reddicap Heath.

== Population ==
It covers an area of 4.60 square miles (11.9 km^{2}). According to the 2001 population census, there were 23,394 people living in 9,887 households in Sutton Trinity and 5.1% (1,183) of the ward's population consists of ethnic minorities compared with 29.6% for Birmingham in general.

== Local politics ==
Sutton Trinity, like all of Sutton Coldfield is dominated by the Conservative Party and is represented by three Conservative councillors: David Allan, David Pears and Keith Ward. Sutton Trinity has adopted a Ward Support Officer.

== Infrastructure ==
=== Schools and colleges ===
Bishop Vesey's Grammar School for boys and Sutton Coldfield Grammar School for Girls are located within the ward. Sutton Coldfield College, located next to Bishop Vesey's Grammar School, is a college of further education. A separate building owned by Sutton College, located opposite Holy Trinity Church, is in use as the media centre. Sutton Coldfield Library is located in Sutton Town Centre in the Rose Centre.

=== Medical ===
Good Hope Hospital on the Rectory Road is the main hospital for the whole town.

=== Transport ===
Sutton Coldfield railway station on the Cross-City Line serves the town centre. There are a number of bus services operated by National Express West Midlands that stop at the Parade in Sutton town centre.

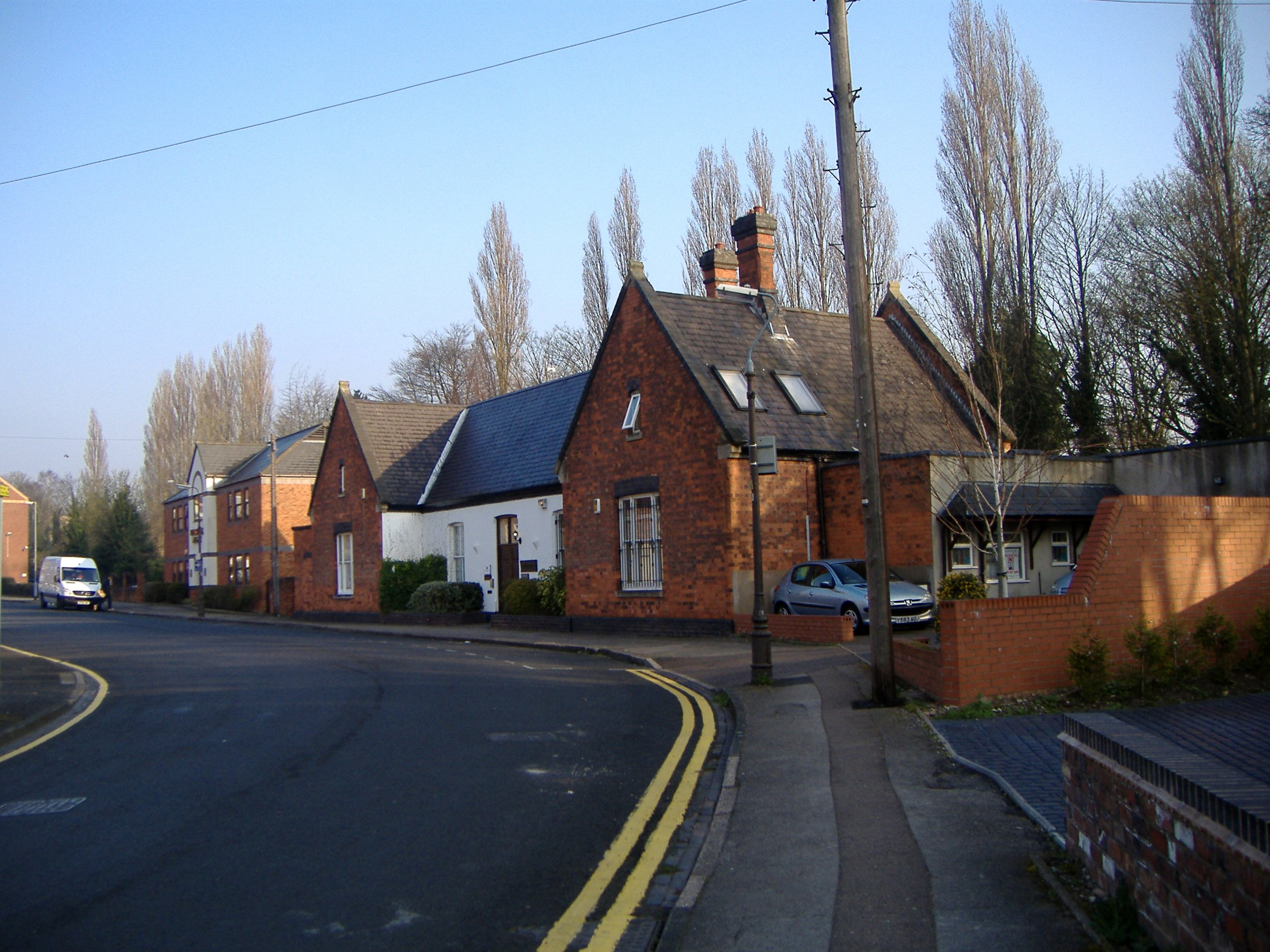
Sutton Town railway station on Midland Drive.

From 1879 until 1924, Sutton Coldfield was served by the Sutton Town railway station, as well as the LNWR-owned Sutton Coldfield railway station. It was forced to shut as a result of low passenger figures. The buildings still remain but as office buildings.

== Sport ==
The town is served by the Wyndley Leisure Centre, which is the largest leisure centre in Birmingham. It is located on the edge of Sutton Park and is used by local football teams for training.
