= The Northern Boys =

British hip hop group

- Origin: Sutton Coldfield, England
- Genres: British hip-hop; comedy hip-hop; rap rock; hardcore hip-hop; horrorcore
- Years active: 2022–present
- Label: Sindhuworld
- Members: Norman Pain; Patrick Karneigh Jr.; Kevin

The Northern Boys are an English hip-hop group formed by Liverpool-born rappers Norman Pain and Patrick Karneigh Jr. in Sutton Coldfield in 2022. Pain and Karneigh are the group's only songwriters and performers, but they are considered a trio as they are always accompanied by a dancer known only as Kevin. (Note: Known mononymously in promotional material with no last name publicly given.) They are known for creating the group in their 70s, Pain's gravelly voice, their distinctive lyrical style and northern accents, and performing dark and vulgar comedy hip-hop songs about taboo topics.

== Career ==
The Northern Boys were put together in 2022 by the London-based music collective Sindhuworld, which itself began as a corner shop whose Instagram page went viral for its musings on everyday life. Karneigh and Pain reportedly met while working as teachers at Bishop Vesey's Grammar School in Sutton Coldfield, though both are originally from Liverpool, which inspired the group's name as Liverpool is in Northwest England whereas Sutton Coldfield is in the West Midlands. Prior to forming the Northern Boys, both had solo music careers and had released music via Sindhuworld, as well as making guest appearances on Pete & Bas tracks as part of the Snooker Team collective.

On 15 September 2022, The Northern Boys released the music video for their debut single "Party Time" (titled onscreen as "Northern Boy") on YouTube. The music video, filmed locally in Sutton Park, gained over 400,000 views on YouTube and 2 million on TikTok within a week. The song's highly vulgar lyrics were rapped over the instrumental to Estelle's song "American Boy". Kevin had suggested that they choose a dance beat for the song rather than a more typical hip hop track so that he could dance to it. Reception of the song was largely positive. Entertainment.ie described the song as "one of the darkest yet funniest songs we've heard in a long time" and praised the music video as a "work of art". Vulture called "Party Time" a "certified banger" with "disarmingly frank, funny lyrics about sex, drugs, partying, and the crippling mental health issues stemming from repressed white English masculinity".

The Northern Boys' next song "Nobody Likes Me" sampled "Acceptable in the 80s" by Calvin Harris and was released in October 2022. Them magazine reported favorably on its TikTok popularity from LGBTQ+ users, who appreciated one of Pain's lyrics that described a positive sexual encounter with a trans man. GRM Daily, which praised The Northern Boys as "some of rap's unlikeliest heroes", said that the song "slaps". The song was later pulled from streaming services due to the unauthorised sampling of "Acceptable in the 80s", but the music video remains available on YouTube. A review from The White Pube highlighted the distinctly English themes of anger and embarrassment in the group's work: "I can't think of anything more deeply English to represent us [at Eurovision]. I want art that admits there's a badness growing over us plebs like the mould in the beige houses we rent from jobless kings and queens."

On 23 March 2023, the group released "Give It to Me". The single made a more in-depth exploration of LGBTQ+ themes in its music video and was described by GRM Daily as "fun, cheeky, and will have you bopping along". The music video for their song "Sexy Train" was filmed at Euston railway station and was released on YouTube on 6 July 2023. This was followed four months later by "F the World", which saw the Northern Boys explore an "anarchistic and punk-influenced sound" and included footage of their live performances in the song's music video. "F the World" received some attention in the rock music community, with Ultimate Guitar listing it at No. 13 on their "20 Best Songs of 2023" list and writing, "With a stream-of-consciousness lyrical style and a provocative attitude, the trio made waves online, exploring controversial topics in their songs and even taking on a punk edge on 'F the World'."

The Northern Boys' only single of 2024, "Robot Man", was released on 11 January; the music video features the band dressed in poorly-made robot costumes while making double entendres about cybersex. On Christmas Day that year, they released the first episode of their podcast, “The Northern Boys Podcast”.

== Artistry ==
The Northern Boys have described their writing process as "bang[ing] out ideas in drunken stupors" that results in a distinctive stream-of-consciousness lyrical style. The White Pube has described the band's depiction of class, gender, and race as a key part of their appeal. Kevin, the third member of the group, does not appear on vocals but is always featured in the band's music videos as a dancer.

== Discography ==
=== Singles ===
- "Party Time" (2022)
- "Nobody Likes Me" (2022)
- "Give It to Me" (2023)
- "Sexy Train" (2023)
- "F the World" (2023)
- "Robot Man" (2024)
- "Crack" (2025)
- "Better Off" (2026)
- "Baddest In Town" (2026)

=== Other appearances ===
- Pete & Bas feat. The Snooker Team – "Window Frame Cypher" (2020)
- Pete & Bas feat. The Snooker Team – "Window Frame Cypher Pt. II" (2022)
- Pete & Bas – "Mugshot Freestyle (The Northern Boys Remix)" (2024)
