= St James' Church, Mere Green =

St James’ Church
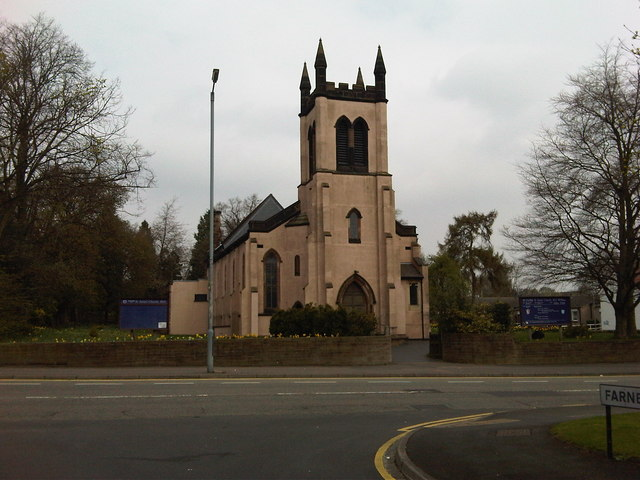
- St James’ Church
- St James’ Church
- 52°35′16.47″N 1°49′26.03″W
- OS grid reference: SP 12029 98936
- Location: Mere Green, Sutton Coldfield
- Country: England
- Denomination: Church of England

History
- Dedication: St James
- Consecrated: 14 December 1835

Architecture
- Heritage designation: Grade II listed
- Architect: Daniel Rollinson Hill
- Groundbreaking: 1834
- Completed: 1835

Administration
- Diocese: Anglican Diocese of Birmingham
- Archdeaconry: Aston
- Deanery: Sutton Coldfield
- Parish: Hill

St James’ Church is a Grade II listed Church of England parish church in Mere Green, Sutton Coldfield, England.

== History ==
It was founded as a daughter church of Holy Trinity Church, Sutton Coldfield. It was built to the designs of the architect Daniel Rollinson Hill and consecrated on 14 December 1835.

An unfortunate incident happened on Good Friday in 1850 when the congregation were overcome by fumes from the stoves used for warming the church.

The church became a parish in its own right in 1853 when land was assigned from Holy Trinity Church, Sutton Coldfield.

Part of the parish was taken to form a new parish of All Saints' Church, Four Oaks in 1890.

In 1908 the chancel had been replaced with a new one by the architect Charles Edward Bateman, who also provided transepts, an organ loft and new vestries. The intention was to rebuild the rest of the church to match, but the scheme was never brought to conclusion.

== Organ ==
The church contained an organ by Forster and Andrews. The opening recital was given on 7 June 1853. A specification of the organ can be found on the National Pipe Organ Register.
