= Laurence Nowell (priest) =

English churchman, dean of Lichfield

Laurence (or Lawrence) Nowell (c. 1516–1576) was an English churchman, who became Archdeacon of Derby and then Dean of Lichfield.

== Life ==
Laurence Nowell was the third son of John Nowell of Read Hall, Read, Lancashire, by his second wife Elizabeth Kay of Rochdale. He was the younger brother of Alexander Nowell (later Dean of St Paul's) and of Robert Nowell (later Attorney of the Court of Wards and Liveries); and a first cousin of his namesake, Laurence Nowell (1530–c. 1570), an antiquarian. He entered Brasenose College, Oxford, in 1536 and received his M.A. in 1544. He was almost certainly the Laurence Nowell appointed master at the grammar school at Sutton Coldfield in Warwickshire in 1546, who, following a dispute with the town's corporation, left the post in 1550, and who in November 1550 was ordained a deacon by Nicholas Ridley, Bishop of London. Having strong Protestant views, Nowell fled England when Queen Mary took the throne, eventually joining his brother Alexander in Frankfurt.

Nowell returned to England on the accession of Elizabeth in 1558. That year he became Archdeacon of Derby. In March 1560, he became Dean of Lichfield. He drew up a will dated 17 October 1576, and was dead by 22 November. He is believed to have been buried at Weston, Derbyshire.

== Identification ==
Two 16th-century English cousins, one a churchman and the other an antiquary, were named Laurence Nowell. Their biographies were confused by Anthony Wood in his Historia et antiquitates Universitatis Oxoniensis (1674) and Athenae Oxonienses (1691), and the error persisted through later studies, including the Dictionary of National Biography (1895), and into the twentieth century. In 1974, however, Retha Warnicke's analysis of a 1571 court case made it clear that there were two different Laurence Nowells, and their biographies have since been partially disentangled.
