= Dan Hemingway =

English rugby union player

- Born: Daniel Philip Hemingway; 3 June 1989 (age 37) Sutton Coldfield, West Midlands, England
- Height: 1.96 m (6 ft 5 in)
- Weight: 107 kg (16 st 12 lb)

Rugby union career
Youth career
- Lichfield
Senior career
Years	Team	Apps	(Points)
- Leicester Tigers
–	Nottingham (loan)		
–	Leeds Carnegie		

Daniel Philip Hemingway (born 3 June 1989) is a former rugby union player. After spending time on loan at Nottingham from the Leicester Tigers, Dan will leave Leeds Carnegie at the end of the 2012–13 season.

His position is usually at blindside flanker, but he has also played at No. 8 and occasionally at lock.

Educated at Bishop Vesey's Grammar School in Sutton Coldfield, Hemingway previously played for Lichfield before joining the Leicester Academy in 2006. He made his first team debut in the 2008–09 Guinness Premiership.

He was part of the Leicester Tigers team to beat a South Africa XV at Welford Road as well as scoring a try in a defeat to the Classic All Blacks.

Dan played for Nottingham on loan for two seasons with dual registration, playing for both Nottingham and Leicester Tigers. This gave him plenty of experience, playing in both the Championship and for the Tigers too. He also played in the British Irish Cup and Championship Play Offs for Nottingham during his time there.

Dan joined Leeds Carnegie before the 2011–12 season on a two-year contract, making his debut on the opening day of the Championship season against London Welsh. He became a regular in the team throughout the season making 22 appearances in total.

A shattered patella during his second season at Leeds lead to Dan being forced to retire from playing in 2013 despite an attempted return to play with Cambridge Rugby Club.
