= Warrens Bakery =

Food manufacturer and retailer in the United Kingdom

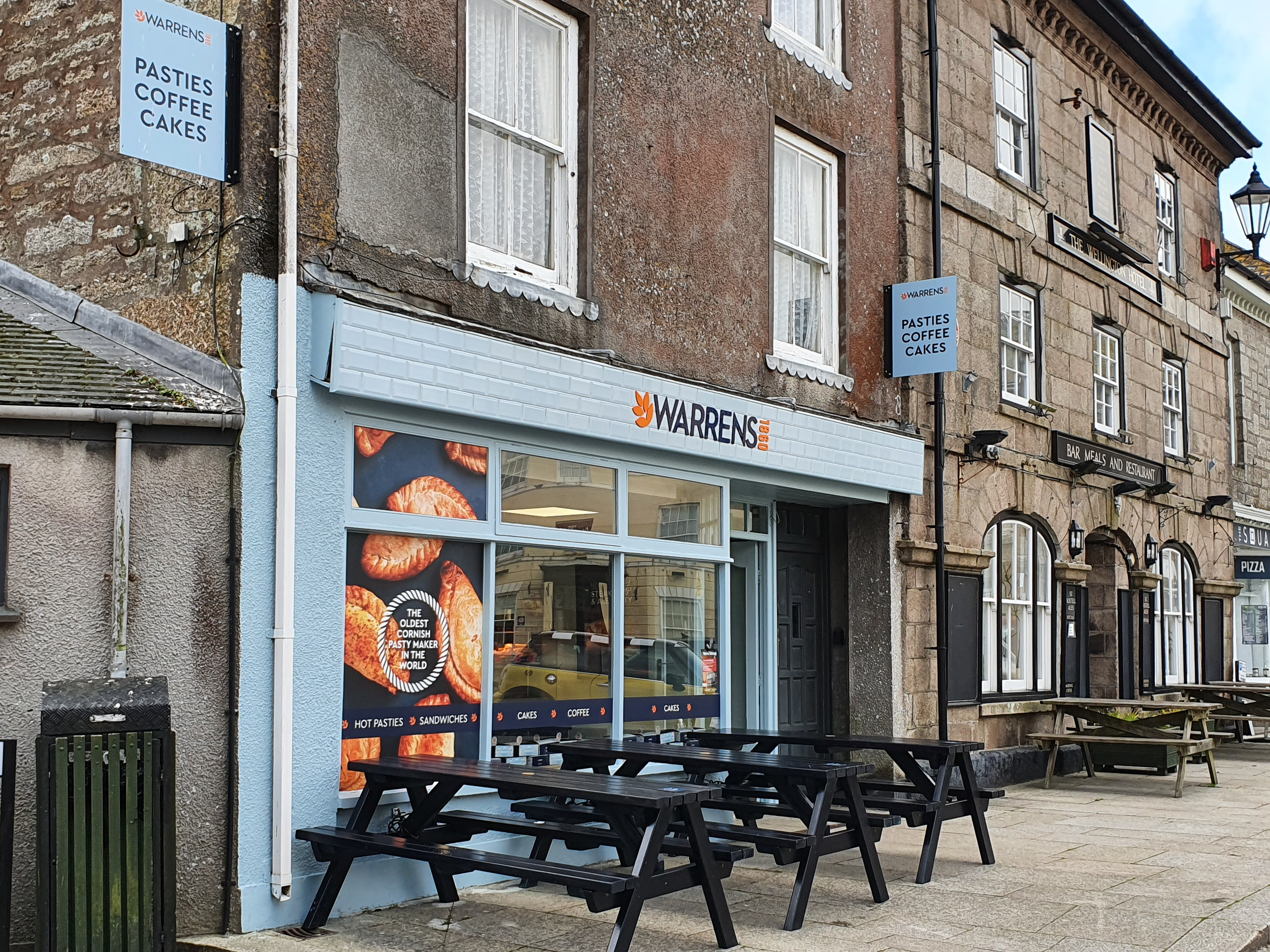
Warrens Bakery, St Just, May 2021

Warrens Bakery is a company based in Cornwall in the United Kingdom, which claims to be Britain's oldest Cornish pasty maker, having been established in St Just in 1860. The company produces baked goods which are sold through its chain of shops and through wholesale channels. In December 2019, Warrens Bakery Limited agreed a company voluntary arrangement with its suppliers and landlords.

== History ==
Previously a family-owned business, in 2012 it became a limited company having attracted outside investors including current chairman Mark Sullivan, following a period in which "competition from rival companies had affected the business". Between March and October 2012, the business closed five stores and a wholesale unit, and made 12 members of staff redundant.

In January 2015, the bakery received £1.6 million in funding from Santander UK's Breakthrough Programme, in order to finance the refurbishment and rebranding of existing shops and the expansion of its retail activities. The company obtained a loan of £250,000 from Cornwall Council, to be repaid by April 2021.

In the year to 30 June 2018, despite an increase in turnover, the company made a before-tax loss of £915,000 which was attributed to the trading environment, increases in ingredient costs and the start-up costs of several new retail stores. Net current liabilities were £1.5m and there were 574 employees.

Further redundancies followed in 2019. In July, 66 production and distribution jobs were put at risk at the St Just and Plymouth sites. In November, the company announced the closure of the St Just site – occupied since the 1970s – and 20 stores, including reversal of an expansion into Wiltshire. By the end of the year, the workforce had fallen to around 350. The shop in Mere Green in the West Midlands, which had opened in 2017 and was the only shop outside the South West, also closed in 2019.

Following a meeting of creditors in December 2019, the company entered a company voluntary arrangement – a type of insolvency.

== Structure and operations ==
As of January 2020, Warrens is the largest chain of bakeries in South West England, with 44 shops, mostly in Cornwall, Devon and Somerset. It also sells products online and through other retailers via its wholesale brand, Simply Cornish.

Since a reorganisation in June 2016, the company has been a subsidiary of Provenance Brands Limited, alongside Cornish Sea Salt Company Limited. Provenance also owns Warrens Bakery Franchise Limited, which manages franchised outlets and in 2018 was said to have "several hundred stores in the pipeline".

== Controversy ==
The chain describes itself as the "oldest Cornish pasty maker in the world", claiming that it has "served the public proudly since 1860". This claim was challenged as misleading in a case brought to the Advertising Standards Authority (ASA). In December 2014, the ASA ruled in favour of Warrens. While documents provided by the bakery "were not sufficient to confirm, with absolute certainty, that a bakery owned by William Harvey had been established at 8 Queen Street in 1860", according to the ASA they did prove "that the shop had been in existence since 1873".
