= Moor Hall =

Coordinates: 52°34′57.40″N 1°48′41.04″W

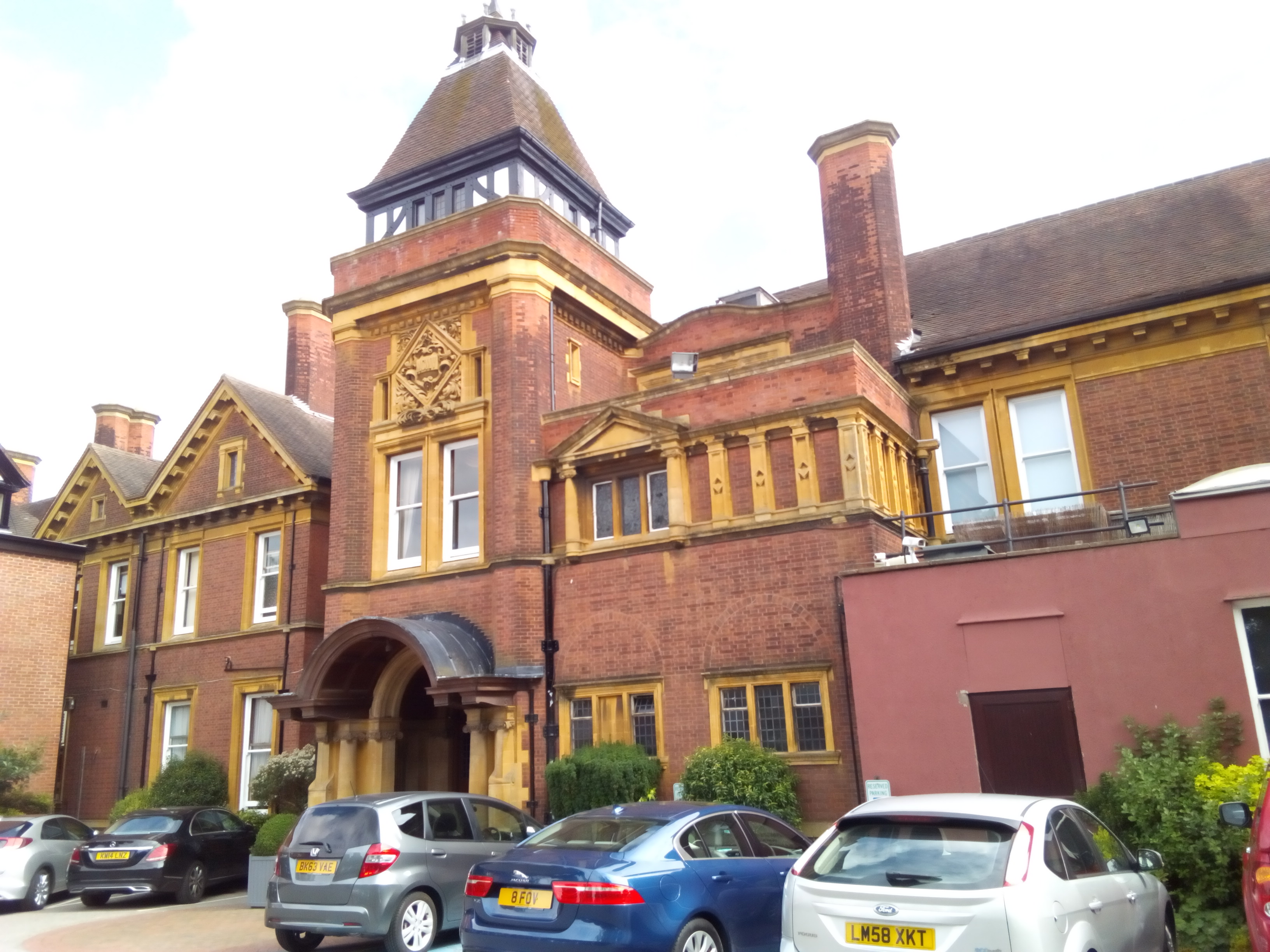
- The house in August 2016
- Interactive map of the Moor Hall area
- Alternative names: Moor Hall Hotel & Spa

General information
- Status: In use
- Type: House (now hotel)
- Architectural style: Arts & Crafts
- Location: Sutton Coldfield, Birmingham, England
- Construction started: 1905
- Renovated: 1930, etc

The Moor Hall is a 1905 house, built for Colonel Edward Ansell of Ansells Brewery, in Sutton Coldfield, Birmingham, England. It has been used as a hotel since 1930 and subsequently extended. It is on the site of a former 15th century building. It gives its name to a suburb of the town, situated between the district of Roughley and Sutton town centre.

== The old house ==
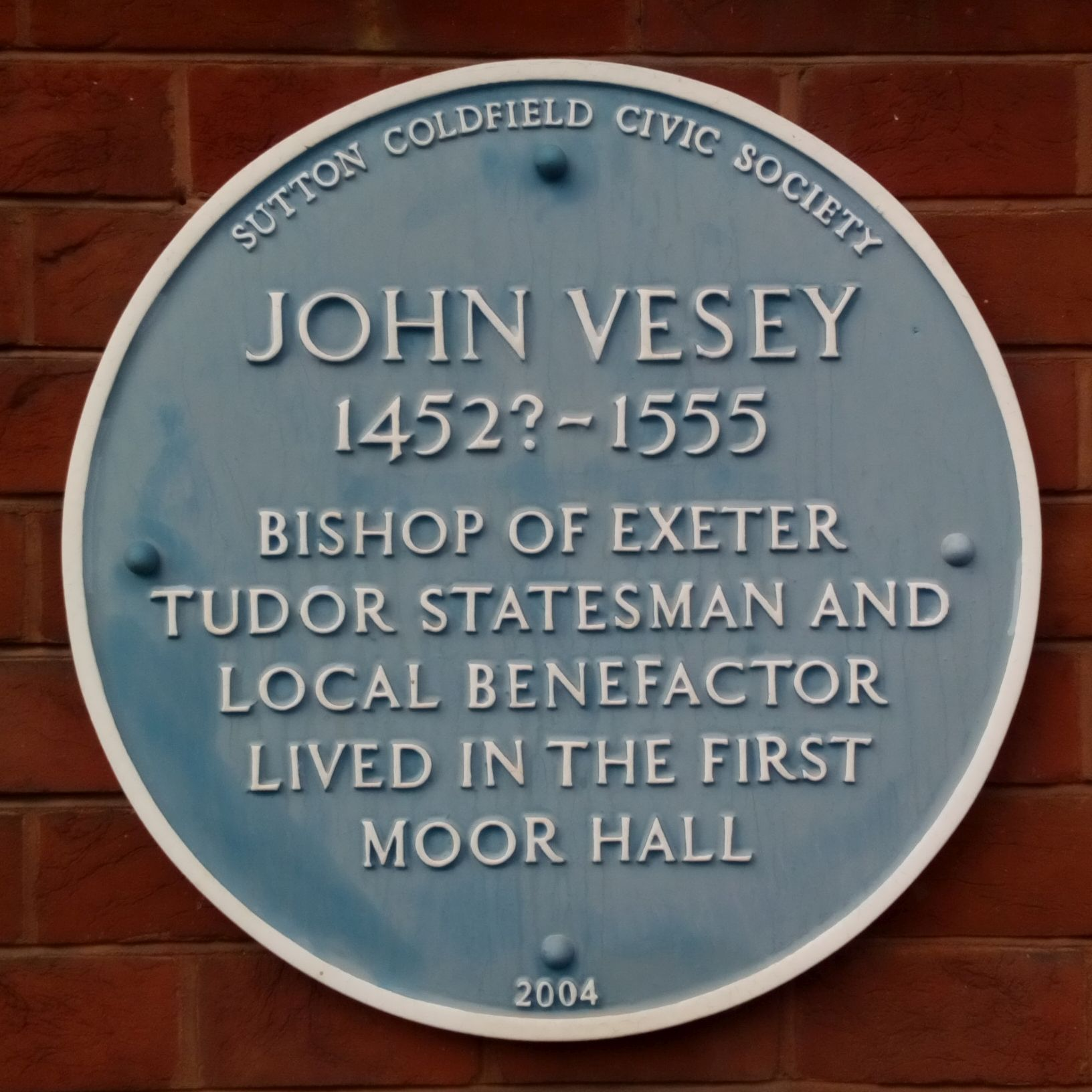
Blue plaque commemorating John Vesey

First records of a hall on the site date back to the 15th century when it was owned by a Roger Harwell.

In 1527, Bishop John Vesey bought 40 acres (160,000 m^{2}) of land for £1500 in Sutton Coldfield called Moor Crofts and Heath Yards close to the farm in which he had been born and raised. Built in brick, it was a substantial mansion for his own occupation. When he was not in London on Court duties or in Exeter on church duties, he lived at Moor Hall. It is said he employed 140 scarlet liveried servants. He frequently entertained Henry VIII, which is why, it is thought, Sutton Coldfield was awarded its royal charter.

In 1551, he retired on a pension of £485 a year at the age of about 88 but lived only a further four years. When Vesey died in 1555, Moor Hall fell into the possession his nephew, John Harman.

The 1671 Valuation of Sutton Coldfield shows the property in the possession of John Addyes with a value of £61 a year. The Addyes family remained in occupation until 1762. At this time the property was said to comprise twenty rooms on three floors but was described in 1762 by an 'Impartial Hand' as:

a very poor pile of building, without prospect or indeed any one beauty to recommend it to a man of taste... the timber is said to be as valuable as the land

After the mid-19th century, the house saw a series of tenants.

A former cock pit or bear pit, in the grounds, are Grade II listed.

== 1905 Building ==
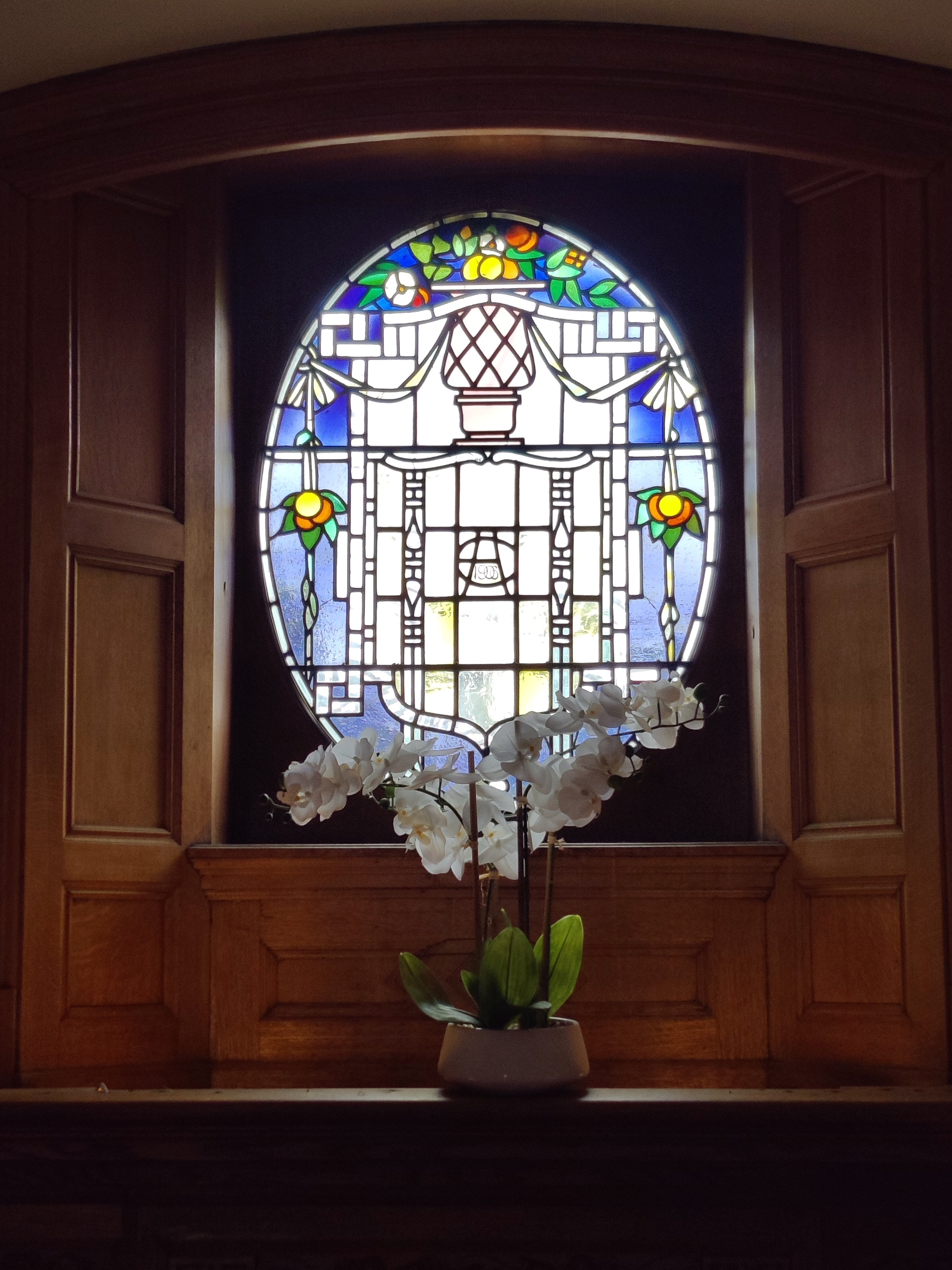
Stained glass window in the former main hall (now a bar), with the initials "EA" and the date "1906"

In 1903, Colonel Edward Ansell of Ansells Brewery bought the house. He demolished it and, in 1905, constructed an entirely new modern mansion for his own occupation on the site. All of the wood carvings and stone work were created on site, and architects from all over the country came to admire the workmanship. The fireplace in the lounge bar has MCMV (1905) carved in the mantel and over the main entrance. A stained glass window says 1906. The Ansells lived in the new house until 1930 when the whole estate was auctioned off.

== Use as a hotel ==
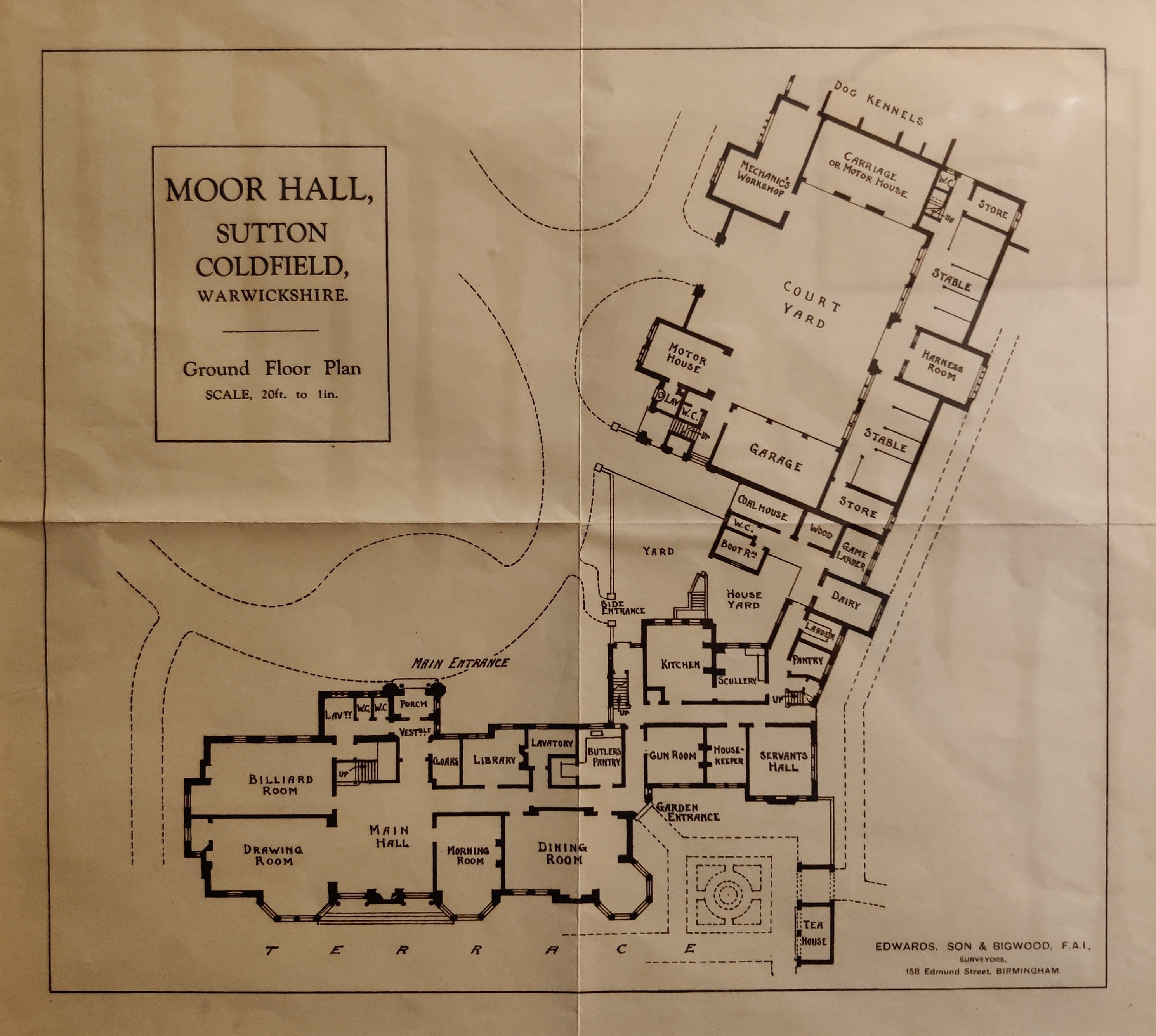
Plan of the ground floor of Moor Hall at the time of its 1930 sale by auction

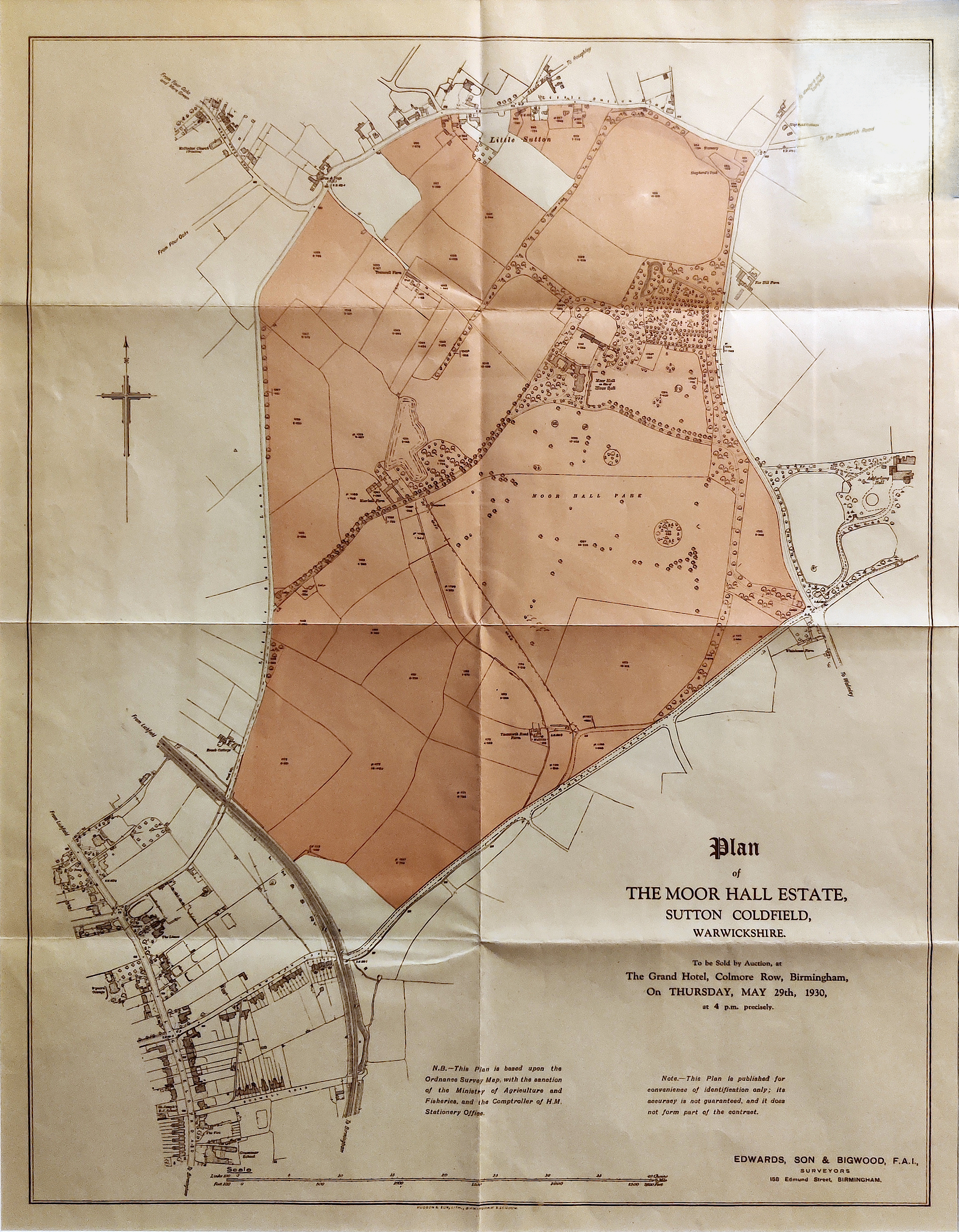
Plan of the estate at the time of its 1930 sale by auction

The house and grounds were sold for £35,000 to a local builder Robert Streather who converted the 1905 mansion into a hotel, created a golf course on the park and in exchange was granted permission to develop the remaining land with upmarket residential properties. It was said to be the sort of place where:

aged, retired gentlemen sat most of the day buried in the Times and scowling at the slightest movement or noise from their fellows

The 1905 house is still discernible as part of the much altered and extended hotel.

It was 1961 when Michael Webb (1930-2024) bought the property and gradually developed the 17 bedroom guesthouse into the present 4 star hotel with 83 bedrooms, 8 conference rooms, 2 restaurants and leisure centre and spa. It is now owned by the Webb family. They currently own Moor Hall hotel, The George Hotel in Lichfield, The Gables near Bristol and Broads Travel in Sutton Coldfield and Lichfield.

The Hotel is now part of the Webb Hotels and Travel group, while the golf course is privately owned.

A blue plaque on the rear of the building, erected by the Sutton Coldfield Civic Society, commemorates John Vesey.
