= Holy Trinity Church, Sutton Coldfield =

Holy Trinity Parish Church
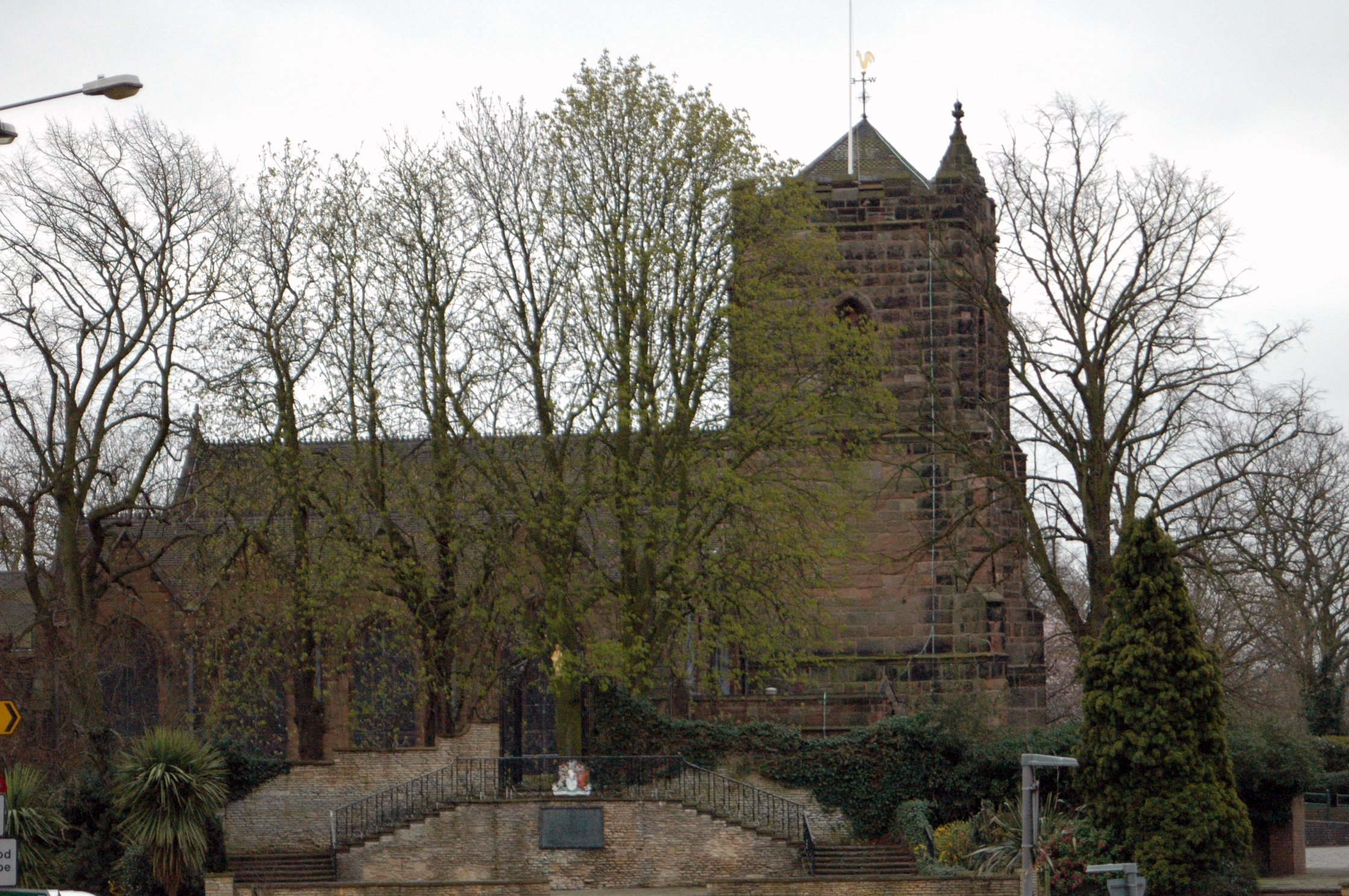
- The church in April 2007
- Holy Trinity Parish Church
- 52.563854°N 1.820148°W
- OS grid reference: SP 12190 96280
- Location: Sutton Coldfield, Birmingham
- Country: England
- Denomination: Church of England
- Website: www.htsc.org.uk

History
- Founded: 15th century or before

Architecture
- Heritage designation: Grade I listed
- Designated: 18 October 1949

Holy Trinity Parish Church is the parish church of Sutton Coldfield, West Midlands, England. It is Grade I listed and gives its name to the ward in which it stands, Sutton Trinity.

== History ==
The first church on the site is thought to have been built in the 13th century, associated with the nearby Sutton Coldfield manor. The earliest part of the current building, the west tower, dates from the late 15th century. In the 1530s, Bishop John Vesey extended the church with two side aisles and added an organ. In the 18th century, galleries, pews and bells were added to the church.

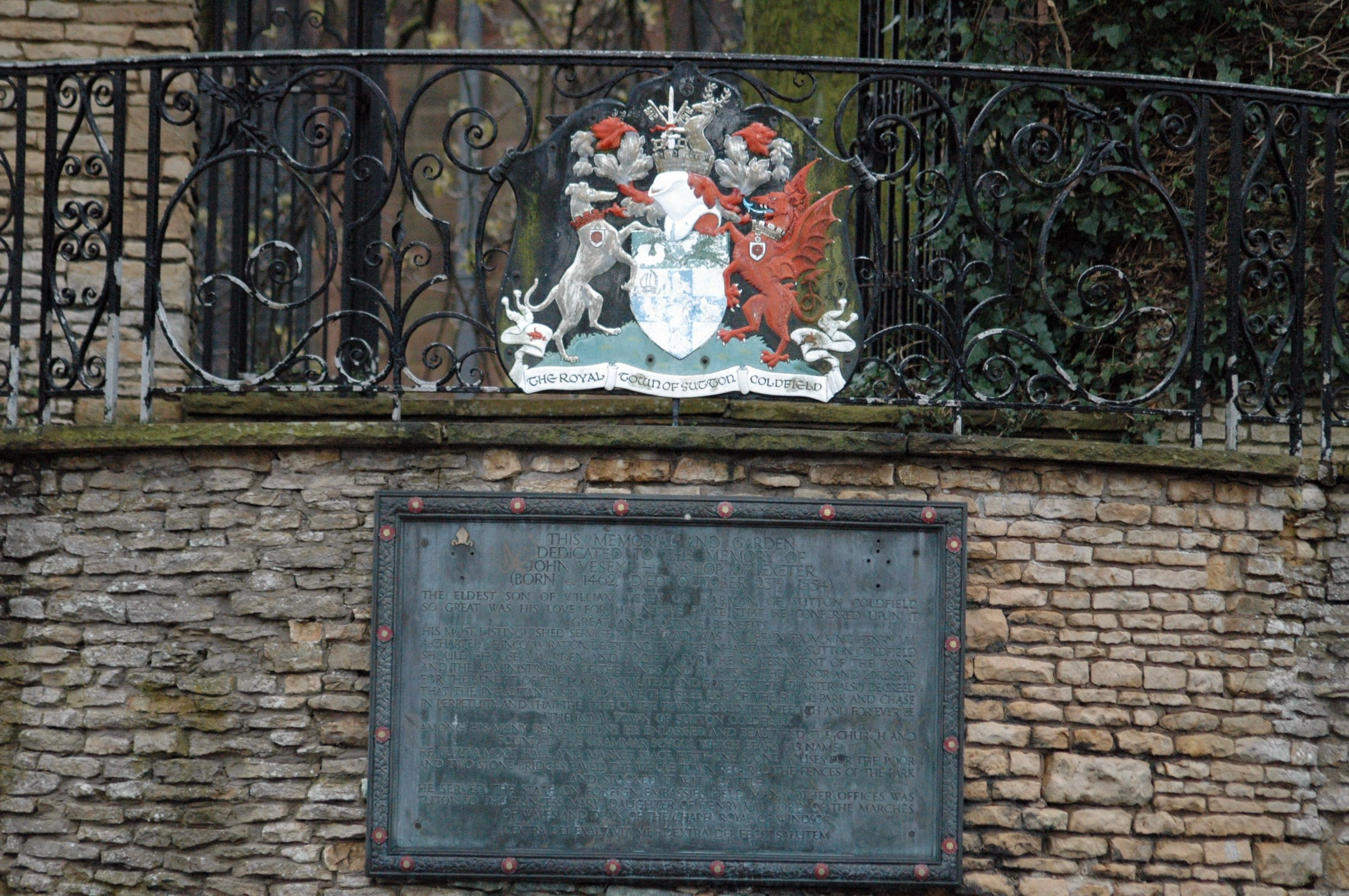
Memorial dedicated to Bishop John Vesey, in Vesey Gardens, located to the side of Holy Trinity Church

Inside the church are the tomb of Bishop Vesey, as well as a font, acquired in the 19th century from the Church of St Lawrence, Over Winacre, Nottinghamshire. The ornate, early 17th-century screens and panelling, fitted in 1875, were removed from the choir and organ casing of Worcester Cathedral in 1864.

In 1835 the church built a chapel near Mere Green which later became St James' Church, Hill. In 1853 part of the parish was taken to form a new parish for St James' Church.

== Clergy ==
Rector John Riland (1736 or 1737–1822) wrote "The Rights of God, occasioned by Mr. Paine's 'Rights of Man,' and his other publications; by way of brief answer to them". A second edition was published in 1797.

== Organ ==
Bishop Vesey gave an organ in the 1530s to be installed in the South Chapel. Little is known of its fate, but it probably disappeared during the English Civil War. A new organ was given by the curate in 1761. An organ of 8 speaking stops was installed in 1829 by Henry Bryceson. This was replaced in 1865 with a 2 manual and pedal instrument by Gray and Davison which later was sold to St Peter’s Church, Irthlingborough, Northamptonshire. On 3 April 1900 a new instrument by Robert Hope-Jones at a cost of £1,500 was opened which was then updated by Hill, Norman and Beard in 1921. In 1950 a new organ was installed at a cost of £6000 by Hill, Norman and Beard.

=== Organists ===
- John Alcock (senior) 1761-1786 (also organist at Lichfield Cathedral, and then Church of St Editha, Tamworth)
- Mr Clark from 1786
- Mr. Cull
- John George Lampert ca. 1860
- Miss Alice Brentnall ca. 1870 - 1890
- George Halford 1890 - 1891 (afterwards organist at St Mary's Church, Handsworth)
- William Eardley 1891 - 1929
- Harold Gray 1931 - 1981
- Donald Francis Alldrick 1981 - 1992
- Simon Lumby 1992 - 1996

== Bells ==
The church tower contains a peal of 8 bells, the third and fourth dating from 1795 by Thomas Mears and the rest from 1884 by John Taylor and Co of Loughborough. The tenor has weight of 1,189 kilograms (2,621 lb).

== Today ==
Formerly in the mediaeval Diocese of Lichfield, the church now operates within the Diocese of Birmingham.

The "Friends of Holy Trinity Parish Church" was established in September 2013 to raise funds for the church. The inaugural Patron was Andrew Mitchell MP. Their first scheduled event in November 2013 was the Royal Town Gala Concert, hosted by Don Maclean.
