= Pete & Bas =

British grime duo

- Origin: London, England
- Genres: British hip hop; UK drill; grime
- Years active: 2017–present
- Label: Sindhuworld
- Members: Peter Leslie Bowditch; Basil Bellgrave
- Website: peteandbas.com

Pete & Bas (/ˈpiːt ən ˈbæz/) are a British hip hop duo based in London, formed in 2017. The duo consists of two rap artists, Peter (Pete) Bowditch and Basil (Bas) Bellgrave, who are both in their 70s. They are notable for songs such as "The Old Estate", "Dents in a Peugeot", and their debut single, "Shut Ya Mouth”.

They released their first single in 2017 with "Shut Ya Mouth". Pete discovered his enjoyment for hip hop after his granddaughter played rap music on his car radio. He shared this with Bas, and they decided it would be fun to release it on YouTube. "Shut Ya Mouth" was an immediate success and went viral, prompting them to begin creating new music. They have also performed successfully in gigs and concert tours across major European cities and have over a million followers on Instagram.

The duo have collaborated with several notable artists. Their single "The Old Estate" features rapper M24, and includes a video filmed on an estate in Rotherhithe, and at The Den, the Millwall football stadium. After releasing a song named after the singer T-Pain, he joined Pete & Bas on a remix version in 2024. Pete & Bas have also collaborated with Norman Pain and Patrick Karneigh, Jr. of the Northern Boys.

Their first album Mugshot was released on 22 November 2024.

In 2026, they attracted significant attention after Bowditch passed out on stage while being suspended from a harness. The band's management released a statement on social media, stating that Bowditch was recovering from the incident.

The duo have also collaborated on a radio advert for Jaffa Cakes that is played on the Greatest Hits Radio.

Their song 'Sindhu Sesh' made the EA Sports UFC 6 videogame.

== Discography ==
=== Albums ===
- Mugshot (2024)

=== Mixtapes ===
- Quick Little Mixtape (2021)

=== Singles ===
Year	Title
2017	"Shut Ya Mouth"
2018	"Do One"
2018	"Burning"
2019	"Keys & Bags" (featuring Patrick Karneigh Jr.)
2019	"Dents in a Peugeot"
2019	"Quick Little Freestyle"
2019	"Pint and a Fag"
2020	"Window Frame Cypher" (featuring the Snooker Team)
2020	"Lightwork Freestyle"
2020	"The Old Estate" (featuring M24)
2021	"Golf" (featuring Norman Pain)
2021	"Speeding"
2021	"Plugged In" (with Fumez the Engineer)
2021	"Bermondsey"
2021	"You Know It's Christmas"
2022	"Mr Worldwide"
2022	"Browns"
2022	"Shuffle"
2022	"Window Frame Cypher Part 2" (featuring the Snooker Team)
2022	"Sindhu Sesh"
2022	"Move It"
2023	"Quick 1-2"
2023	”Gangster Shit”
2023	"Top of the World"
2023	"Longthorne Shotgun"
2023	"Stepped into the Building"
2024	"Gentlemen"
2024	"Get Low"
2024	"Bish Bash Bosh"
2024	"T-Pain"
2024	"T-Pain Remix" (featuring T-Pain)
2024	"Action Man"
2025	"South EastEnders"
2025	"Chunky Chips"
2025	"Stay Shining"
2025	"Encore"
2026	"Call Me Back" (with Ragga Twins & Krucial)
2026	“Fresh Home”
2026	“Top Down”
2026	“Oldschool Gangsta”
2026	“Too Slick”

==== As featured artists ====
Year	Title	Artist
2025	"Jeremy Kyle"	Big Tobz (featuring Pete & Bas and Ambush Buzzworl)
2024	"Baddest"	Vibe Chemistry (featuring Pete & Bas, Jaykae, Azza x Grima and P Money)
2021	"The Coldest Link Up 2.0"	Tweeko X Sebz (featuring Double Lz, Onefour, S Wavey, TS, J.B2, Zone2 and Pete & Bas)
2026	"Kin (I'm Outside)"	Prof (featuring Pete & Bas and JonRay)
