= Mere Green, Birmingham =

Commercial centre in Four Oaks, Sutton Coldfield, England

Coordinates: 52.587589°N 1.830125°W

Mere Green is a small commercial centre in Four Oaks, Sutton Coldfield, England.

== Facilities ==
Mere Green includes a mixture of independent shops, bars and restaurants and some national chain stores located around the junction of Lichfield Road, Belwell Lane, Hill Village Road and Mere Green Road.

Supermarkets include Marks and Spencer, Sainsbury's, Lidl and Aldi. There are several pubs in the area including the Mare Pool (Wetherspoons), Renato Lounge, Old School House (now closed) and the Fox and Dogs. Mere Green was also home to Flints which was a bar that was very popular in the 1970s and 1980s. It underwent various changes in ownership and name before resorting back to its original name in 2018. By 2022 it had ceased trading and in 2024 (along with the adjacent former Waitrose building) it was demolished to make way for the construction of an Aldi store. Aldi opened in October 2024.

Mere Green Library and Community Centre offers classes in such subjects as yoga and art, free internet access and facilities for tennis and lawn green bowls as well as hosting reading groups for adults and children and occasional exhibitions.

The area made the news in 1983 when Italian Renato Pagliari, then co-owner of the La Gondola restaurant in Mere Green, scored a No 1 hit single in the UK as one half of the singing duo 'Renée and Renato' with the song 'Save Your Love'. The restaurant no longer exists.

== Redevelopment ==
Plans were outlined for a major redevelopment of the Mere Green shopping area, which would involve the demolition of many of the smaller shops. The scheme, led by Spring Urban, was approved in August 2007. The development was however delayed by the recession and again when Spring Urban's parent company, Castlemore Securities, went into administration in February 2009.

Work finally began on the £15 million "Mulberry Walk" scheme in September 2015.

The first new store on the development that opened was Boots, which opened on 17 August 2016. Warrens Bakery moved in in February 2017, making the development home to their first store outside the West Country. This store closed in 2019.

== Public Transport ==
Bus is the main public transport to and from Mere Green. Most services are operated by National Express West Midlands (NXWM) with service 78 operated by Diamond Bus and service 604 operated by Claribel Coaches. Service 604 will be operated by National Express from 25th April 2022. Until 2019, Midland Classic operated service X12 between Sutton Coldfield and Burton-upon-Trent which partly replaced the former Stevensons (later Arriva Midlands) service 112. Routes include:

- 6 Walsall - Sutton Coldfield
- 78 Queslett - Sutton Coldfield. Part replaced by 78 (see below).
- 604 Kingstanding - Mere Green This service has now been replaced by service 78A operating between Kingstanding and Sutton Coldfield, also replacing part of the 78.
- X3 Birmingham - Hill Hook. This service was extended to serve Lichfield in 2019 partially replacing Midland Classic service X12.
- X5 Birmingham - Roughley

Mere Green centre is approximately 2/3 of a mile from Four Oaks railway station on the Cross-City Line which provides a frequent rail service to Redditch and Bromsgrove via Birmingham New Street and to Lichfield.
