= John Vesey (bishop) =

Bishop of Exeter from 1519 until 1554

The Right Reverend John Vesey
- Bishop of Exeter
- Church: Roman Catholic
- Appointed: 31 August 1519; 28 September 1553
- Term ended: 14 August 1551; 23 October 1554
- Predecessor: Hugh Oldham; Myles Coverdale
- Successor: Myles Coverdale; James Turberville

Orders
- Consecration: 6 November 1519 by William Warham

Personal details
- Died: 23 October 1554
- Buried: Holy Trinity Church
- Coat of arms

Arms of John Vesey, Bishop of Exeter: Argent, on a cross sable a buck's head cabossed couped between four doves of the first on a chief azure a cross flory between two roses or

Arms of John Vesey, Bishop of Exeter, between Renaissance-candelabra stylised initials "JH", with bishop's mitre above. 16th c. stained glass window "in a small church in Devon"

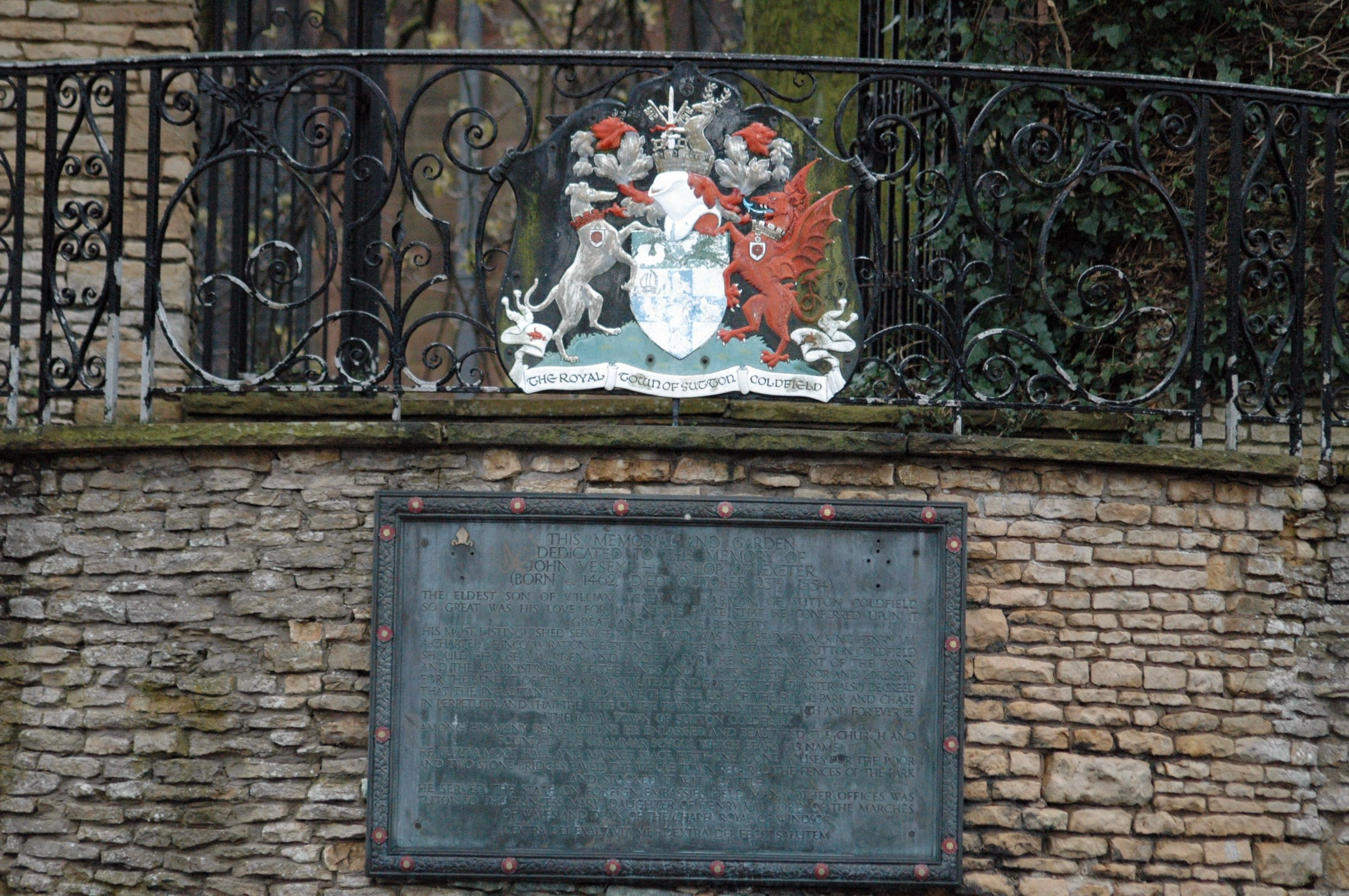
Memorial dedicated to Veysey in Veysey Gardens, located to the side of Holy Trinity Church in Sutton Coldfield where he is buried. The arms of Sutton Coldfield are based on his arms

John Vesey or Veysey (c. 1462 – 23 October 1554) was Bishop of Exeter from 1519 until his death in 1554, having been briefly deposed 1551–3 by King Edward VI for his opposition to the Reformation.

== Origins ==
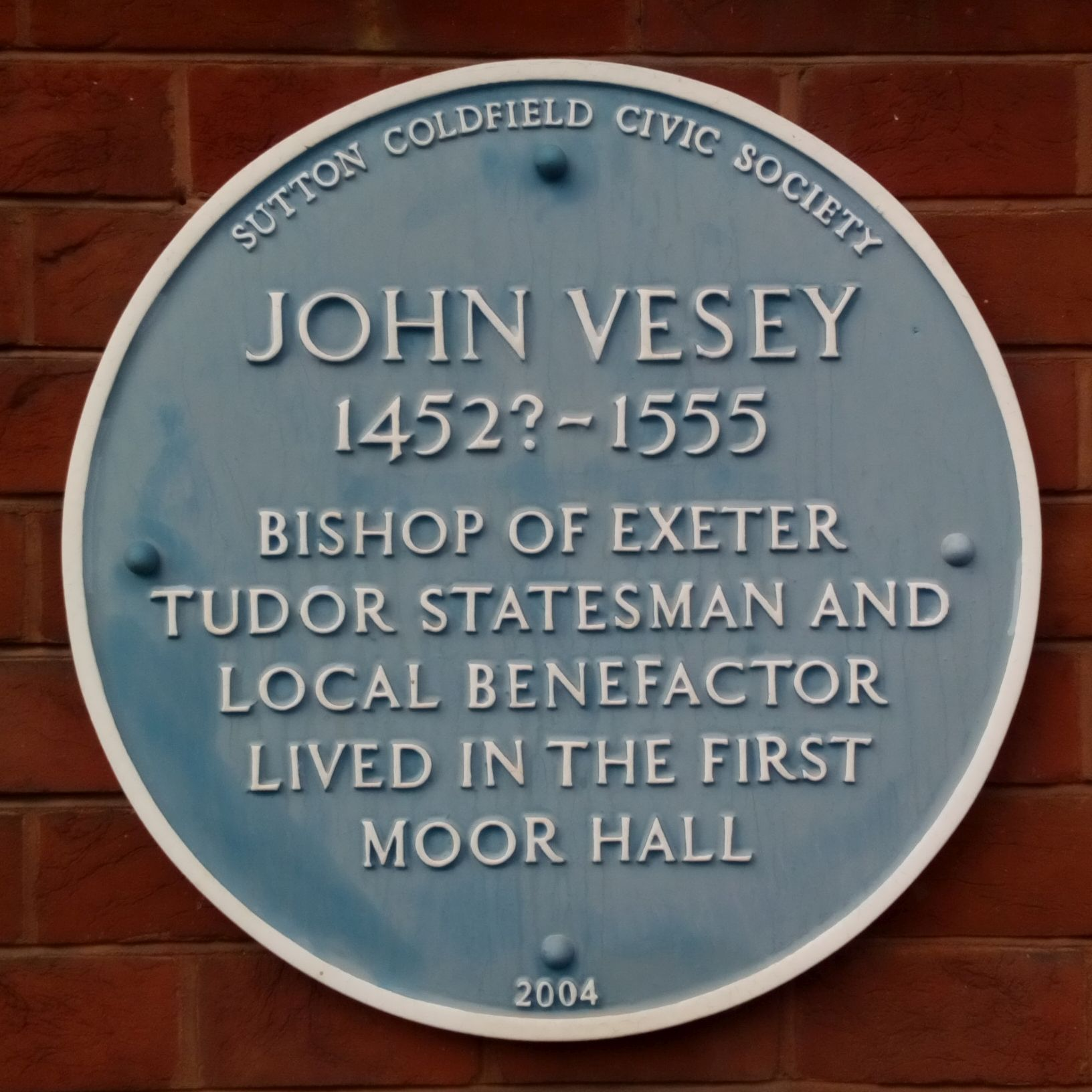
Blue plaque at Moor Hall, Sutton Coldfield, in memory of Bishop Vesey

He was born (as "John Harman"), probably in about 1462, the son of William Harman, Esquire, of Moor Hall in the manor of Sutton Coldfield in Warwickshire, a minor member of the county gentry, who bore arms of: Argent, on a cross sable a buck's head cabossed couped between four doves of the field. He is believed to have adopted the surname "Vesey" in lieu of his patronymic after his tutor of that name. His mother was Joan Squier, daughter and heiress of Henry Squier of Handsworth in Staffordshire.

== Career ==
He received his education at Magdalen College, Oxford, where he gained a doctorate in canon and civil law. After ordination he was appointed Rector of St Mary's Church, Chester. In 1527 he founded a grammar school for boys in Sutton Coldfield, which survives today as Bishop Vesey's Grammar School.

Vesey became a friend of Thomas Wolsey who was also educated at Magdalen College. From some unknown date until 1508 Vesey served as Archdeacon of Barnstaple in North Devon. In 1509 Wolsey became a Canon of Windsor and Chaplain to King Henry VIII. Vesey was appointed a Canon of Exeter Cathedral in Devon. Vesey became the Bishop of Exeter in 1519 and the King awarded him the temporalities of the See of Exeter, worth about £1,500 a year. He was consecrated a bishop on 6 November 1519 by William Warham, Archbishop of Canterbury, assisted by John Fisher, Bishop of Rochester, and Thomas Halsey, Suffragan Bishop of York and Bishop of Leighlin.

In 1527 he acquired a 40 acre plot of land close to his birthplace on which he built a grand house (as of 2013 named Moor Hall (after his father's home), where he occasionally lived, today the site of Moor Hall Hotel.

The town of his birth benefited greatly from his wealth. The township of Sutton Coldfield had fallen on hard times and Vesey took it on himself to restore the fortunes of the town and its inhabitants. He prevailed upon the King to grant a Royal Charter of incorporation for the town in 1528; this entrusted the government of the town to a warden and to 24 local inhabitants known together as the "Warden and Society of the Royal Town of Sutton Coldfield".

Vesey is credited by the historian James Norris Brewer with rebuilding the aisles of Holy Trinity Church, Sutton Coldfield, reviving the markets and building a marketplace, paving the town, building two stone bridges, founding and endowing a free grammar school (Bishop Vesey's Grammar School), and building 51 stone houses, at least four of which survive.

Vesey survived the fall of Wolsey in 1529 and prospered reasonably until 1551 at age 89, when his opposition to the Reformation caught up with him and he was deprived by King Edward VI of his bishopric and its temporalities in exchange for a pension of £485 a year. He was restored to the See of Exeter when the Roman Catholic Queen Mary came to the throne in 1553. His coat of arms as bishop was his paternal arms differenced by the addition of a chief, namely: Argent, on a cross sable a buck's head cabossed between four doves of the first on a chief azure a cross flory between two roses or.

Sutton Coldfield was granted the Royal Tudor Rose by King Henry VIII in thanks for being aided by a young woman who shot dead, with an arrow, a wild boar which was charging at the King in 1528. He asked for the person responsible to come forward and a young woman from Sutton Coldfield came out of the trees. Vesey, a close friend of the King, was present at the incident. They also returned dispossessed land to the young woman's family.

== Death, burial & succession ==
He died on 23 October 1554 and was buried at Holy Trinity Church, Sutton Coldfield, in which survives his monument, comprising his recumbent effigy on a chest tomb. It is nowadays visited as part of an annual ceremony by the school he founded.

His heir was his nephew John Harman (fl.1557/9), the son of his brother Hugh Harman (d.1528) of Moor Hall, who appears to have sold Moor Hall to John Richardson (d.1584).

== In Literature ==
Vesey's life was the subject of various works by Alderman John Willmott: the play Pageant in 1928 (written for the 400th anniversary of Sutton Coldfield's royal charter), Vesey in 1935 (written for the silver jubilee of George V and starring Wilmott himself as Vesey), and a 1948 historical fiction book called Tales of a Bishop and a Royal Town (published by Green & Welburn Ltd of Birmingham in 1948). Wilmott served as a governor of Bishop Vesey Grammar School and, like Vesey, would also have a secondary school in the town named after him.

== Sources ==
- George Oliver, The Lives of the Bishops of Exeter, 1861.
- Fryer, Geoffrey R.D. (1997), John Veysey and His World: A Biography of Bishop Veysey (c.1465–1554) of Sutton Coldfield: published by the author. ISBN 0-9682625-0-3.

Religious titles
Preceded by Hugh Oldham	Bishop of Exeter; 1519–1551	Succeeded by Myles Coverdale
Preceded by Myles Coverdale	Bishop of Exeter; 1553–1554	Succeeded by James Turberville
