= Bishop Vesey's Grammar School =

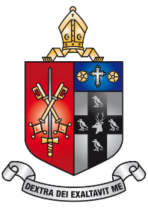

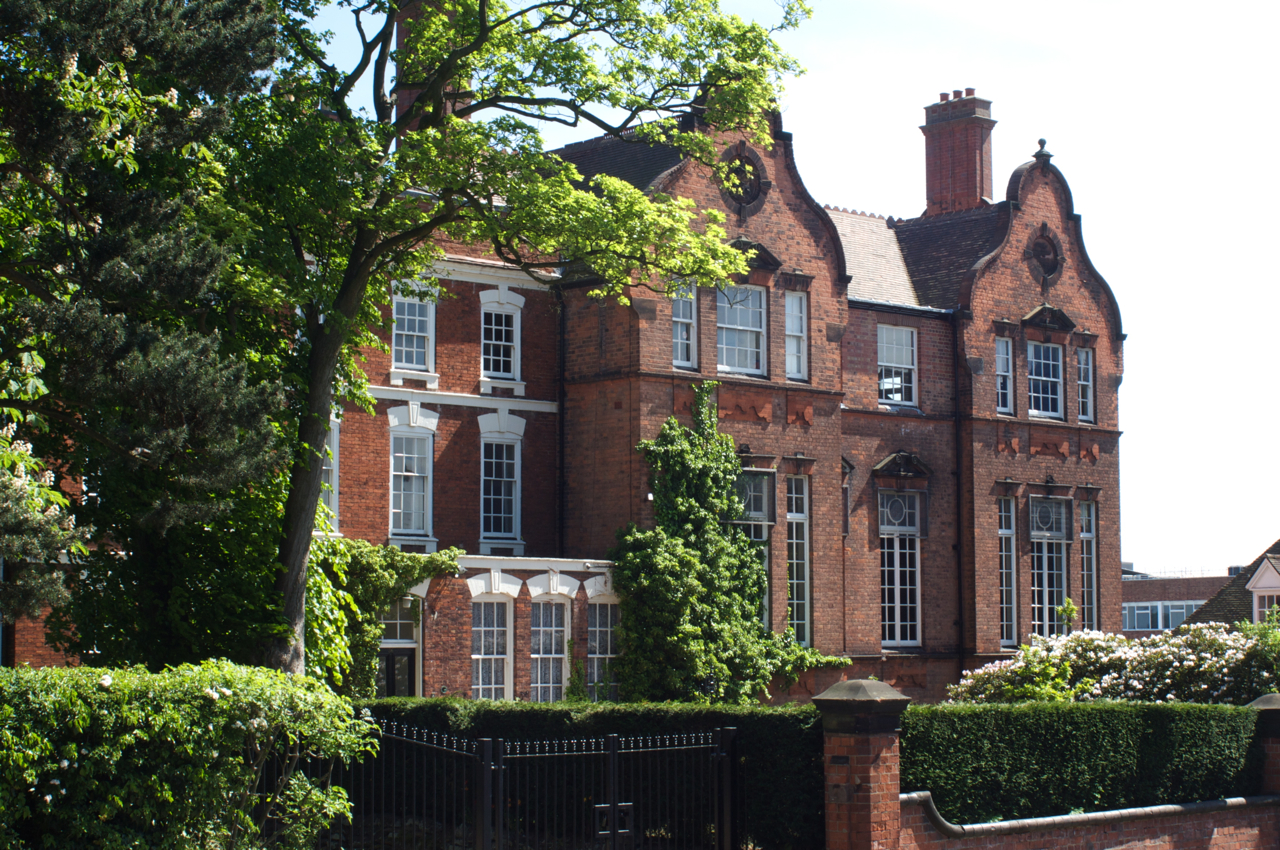

Location
- Lichfield Road/ Boswell Road; Sutton Coldfield, West Midlands, B74 2NH; England; 52.569°N 1.821°W

Information
- Type: Grammar school; Academy
- Mottoes: Dextra Dei Exaltavit Me (The right hand of God exalts me); Inspiration and Excellence
- Religious affiliation: Church of England
- Established: 1527; 499 years ago
- Founder: John Vesey, Bishop of Exeter
- Local authority: Birmingham
- Specialist: Languages
- Department for Education URN: 137988 Tables
- Ofsted: Reports
- Chairman of the Governors: Mark Maybury
- Head Teacher: Dominic Robson BA (Hons) NPQH
- Staff: Approx. 110
- Gender: Boys; Co-educational (16+)
- Age: 11 to 18
- Enrolment: 1025
- Houses: Blue, Gold, Red, White, Purple, Emerald
- Colour
- Publication: Mitre
- Alumni: Old Veseyans
- Website: http://www.bvgs.co.uk

Bishop Vesey's Grammar School (BVGS) is a selective state grammar school with academy status in Sutton Coldfield, West Midlands, England. Founded in 1527, it is one of the oldest schools in Britain, the oldest state school in the West Midlands and the third oldest school in the West Midlands after two independent schools, Bablake School and Wolverhampton Grammar School. The school had boarders until 1969 but is now a day school only.

The school was founded in 1527 by the Bishop of Exeter John Vesey (formerly John Harman) who was a friend of Henry VIII and tutor of his elder daughter Queen Mary I, and it currently has approximately 1025 pupils. The current headteacher is Dominic Robson, who was appointed to the position in September 2012. In 2004 BVGS became a Language College and, in 2007, the school gained Training School status. Former Assistant Headteacher Steve Baugh served as head of the Training School and Continuing Professional Development. The school also houses a co-educational sixth form college. It is situated on the A5127, next to Birmingham Metropolitan College (former Sutton Coldfield College) and the Cross-City Line.

== History ==
=== 16th century ===
The first foundation deed set up by Bishop John Vesey in 1527 provided an endowment from property income of £7 a year and twenty-one people were appointed Trustees to manage the school and pay a fit and proper person to teach Grammar and Rhetoric. Many of the trustees were related to Vesey including his brother Hugh Harman and his brother-in-law William Gibbons, among others. William Gibbons was appointed as the first warden under the Charter of Incorporation, yet no schoolmaster was ever appointed by the trustees of the deed at this time. Because Vesey was not living in Sutton at the time, he did not oversee the trustees duties and obligations. There is no evidence the original trustees carried out their duties of the school.

By 22 August 1540, a second deed was established by Vesey providing for the endowed properties to be held by the Warden and Society of Sutton. The deed states that the schoolmaster must be a layman. Between 1527 and 1540 many developments had occurred in relation to the English Reformation and this stipulation highlighted Vesey's intent to retain Catholic tradition at the time. John Savage was appointed as the first headmaster in 1540. Tuition was free, with traditional, academic subjects such as logic, rhetoric and grammar being taught to the local boys. Until 1544, St Mary's Hall was used as a schoolroom, and then a school was built close to the church on Blind Lane, behind where the Masonic Buildings (the former Town Hall) are located.

On 5 October 1546, John Savage died, and Lawrence Nowell of Brasenose College, Oxford was appointed as his successor. The Corporation started court proceedings to remove him from office due to neglect of the school, presumably because Nowell prioritised his research work. The course decided that he could not be dismissed "except if any notable crime could be proved against him". Nowell won the case, but still agreed to resign the post in early 1548. The Corporation paid him a gratuity of £10 of which Vesey contributed a third to encourage him to leave. Nowell was a supporter of the Reformation which increased the will to remove him from the position.

When Vesey died in 1554, for eighty years after his death the trustees disregarded their obligations for personal gain. School land was leased to friends and family members at low rents which prevented schoolmasters from receiving enough income to maintain the school.

=== 17th century ===
In 1617 Robert Blakesley exhibited a bill against the Warden and Society of Sutton. A commission was established and found that lands with an annual value of £67 had been taken by former wardens and as little as £10 annually was given to the headmaster. The commission advised the Corporation that proceedings should be made to recover the school land but because Blakesley did not live in Sutton the Court settled against Blakesley. The Corporation did not take action to improve the school's finances.

Complaints relating to the diligence of the Trustees and the Corporation came before the Chancery Court which ordered in 1636 that control be transferred to a new board of fourteen Trustees.

=== 20th century ===
In November 1981, 13-year-old John Haddon was abducted on his way to school from nearby Sutton Park and subsequently murdered. His body was found near Fenny Drayton. Two males, Paul Corrigan aged 30 and 15-year-old Derek McInnes, were charged with his murder in December 1981.

In the 1990s, the rugby pitch at the Tamworth Road end of the playing fields was sold for residential development, to fund various projects such as the "Randon Design Centre". The Randon Design Centre was constructed in 1990 at a cost of £1.5 million. The block houses the art and design and technology departments and was designed by Birmingham-based Associated Architects. The library, which was located on the site of the Randon Design Centre, was moved into an extension constructed on the main school building.

== Sports ==
In April 2008, Isaac of Bath Rugby and the Samoa national rugby union team announced he was to retire and take up the head of rugby position at Bishop Vesey's Grammar School.

== Head teachers ==
Although founded in 1527, the first headmaster was not appointed until 1540, when a new foundation deed specified that the schoolmaster must be a layman.

- John Savage (1540–1546)
- Lawrence Nowell (1546–1549)
- John Heath (?–?)
- John Michael (?–?)
- John Savage (?–1639)
- William Hill (1639–1647)
- John Elley (1647–1659)
- William Chancy (1659–1687)
- William Sandars (1687–1724)
- Paul Lowe (1724–1764)
- William Webb (1764–1817)
- Charles Barker (1817–1842)
- James Eccleston (1842–1849)
- Josiah Wright (1849–1863)
- Albert Smith (1863–1902)
- Herbert Jerrard (1902–1926)
- Richard William Wright (1926–1929)
- Abel Sylvanus Jones (1929–1947)
- Geoffrey John Cross (1947–1965)
- Arthur John Johnson (1965–1974)
- James Philip Nelson (acting, 1974–1975)
- Reginald John Harvey (1975–1988)
- Marie Elaine Clarke (1989–2002)
- David John Iddon (2003–2012)
- Dominic Robson (2012–)

== Notable former faculty ==
- Norman Pain, member of The Northern Boys
- Patrick Karneigh Jr., member of The Northern Boys

== Notable former pupils ==
- Scott Adkins, actor
- Richard Baker, CEO of Alliance Boots from 2004 to 2007
- Prof Maurice Beresford, archaeologist and historian, Professor of Economic History from 1959 to 1985 at the University of Leeds
- Keith Bradley, politician and life peer
- Michael C. Brewer, conductor
- Bill Buckley, radio and TV presenter [BVGS 1970–1977]
- Robert Burton (1577–1640), author of The Anatomy of Melancholy
- Hamish Carter (born 1998), gymnast
- Stuart Cheshire, Engineer at Apple and pioneer of Zeroconf networking in the form of Bonjour [BVGS 1980–1986]
- Philip Cox, CEO since 2003 of International Power
- Graham Crabb, musician, Pop Will Eat Itself
- Cat Deeley, model and TV presenter
- John English, theatre director and founder of the Midlands Arts Centre
- Vernon Harrison, President of the Royal Photographic Society 1974–1976, and photography researcher
- Dan Hemingway, Leicester Tigers rugby player.
- Dan Hicks archaeologist and anthropologist
- Sir Julian King, diplomat and civil servant European Commissioner for the Security Union 2016-2019 and Ambassador to Ireland 2009-2011
- John Leese, journalist, editor of the Evening Standard 1986–1991
- Ken Miles, racing car driver
- John Mogg, Baron Mogg, civil servant
- John Pritchett, golfer
- Sir Peter Ricketts KCMG, Permanent Under Secretary of the Foreign and Commonwealth Office 2006–2010, and Ambassador to France from 2012 [BVGS 1964–1971]
- Peter Robbins, rugby player, Coventry and England 1956–1962
- Stephen Roberts, historian
- Cyril Stanley Smith, metallurgist and historian of science
- Showell Styles, novelist and explorer
- Francis Willughby, ornithologist and ichthyologist
