= List of places in West Midlands (county) =

Some of the larger settlements of the West Midlands. Bold indicates city status.

This is a list of cities, towns, villages and other settlements in the ceremonial county of West Midlands, England (not the West Midlands region).

== A ==
Acocks Green, Adderley Park, Aldridge, Aldersley, All Saints, Allesley, Allesley Green, Allesley Park, Alum Rock, Alumwell, Amblecote, Ashmore Park, Ashted, Aston, Aston Cross, Aston Triangle, Austin Village

== B ==
Ball Hill, Balsall Common, Balsall Heath, Balti Triangle, Barr Beacon, Barston, Bartley Green, Bearwood, Beech Lanes, Beechdale, Bell Green, Bentley, Bentley Heath, Berkswell, Bickenhill, Billesley, Bilston, Binley, Birches Green, Birchfield, Birmingham, Birmingham Chinatown, Birmingham City Centre, Bishopgate Green, Blackheath, Black Country, Blakenall Heath, Blakenhall, Blossomfield, Bloxwich, Boldmere, Bordesley, Bordesley Green, Bournbrook, Bournville, Bradley, Bradmore, Brandhall, Brandwood End, Brierley Hill, Brindleyplace, Bromford, Bromley, Brownhills, Brownhills West, Browns Green, Buckland End, Buckpool, Bushbury

== C ==
Caldmore, California, Camp Hill, Canley, Cannon Park, Castle Bromwich, Castle Vale, Castlecroft, Catherine-de-Barnes, Causeway Green, Chad Valley, Chadwick End, Chapel Ash, Chapelfields, Charlemont with Grove Vale, Chelmsley Wood, Cheswick Green, Cheylesmore, Chinese Quarter, Chuckery, Churchfield, Claregate, Clayhanger, Coal Pool, Cofton Common, Compton, Convention Quarter, Copt Heath, Coseley, Cotteridge, Coundon, Courthouse Green, Coventry, Cradley, Cradley Heath

== D ==
Darlaston, Deritend, Dickens Heath, Digbeth, Doe Bank, Dorridge, Driffold, Druids Heath, Duddeston, Dudley, Dudley Town Centre, Dunstall Hill

== E ==
Earlsdon, Earlswood, Eastern Green, Eastside, Edgbaston, Edgwick, Elmdon, Elmdon Heath, Erdington, Ernesford Grange, Ettingshall

== F ==
Falcon Lodge, Fallings Park, Finchfield, Finham, Five Ways, Foleshill, Fordbridge, Fordhouses, Four Oaks, Fox Hollies, Fox & Goose

== G ==
Garretts Green, Gas Street Basin, Gay Village, Gib Heath, Gibbet Hill, Gilbertstone, Goldthorn Park, Gornal, Gornal Wood, Gosta Green, Graiseley, Gravelly Hill, Great Barr, Great Bridge, Greet, Gun Quarter

== H ==
Hall Green, Halesowen, Hampton in Arden, Hamstead, Handsworth, Handsworth Wood, Harborne, Harden, Hawbush, Hawkesley, Hay Mills, Heath Town, High Heath, Highter's Heath, Highgate (Birmingham), Highgate (Walsall), Hill Hook, Hillfields, Hockley, Hockley Heath, Hodge Hill, Holbrooks, Horseley Fields, Horseley Heath, Hurst Green

== I ==
Illey, Illshaw Heath, Irish Quarter

== J ==
Jewellery Quarter

== K ==
Kates Hill, Keresley, Kings Heath, Kings Norton, Kingshurst, Kingstanding, Kingswinford, Kitts Green, Knowle

== L ==
Ladywood, Lanesfield, Langley Green, Lea Hall, Leamore, Lee Bank, Little Bloxwich, Little Bromwich, Longbridge, Longford, Low Hill, Lozells, Lye, Lyndon, Lyndon Green

== M ==
Maney, Marston Green, Masshouse, Maypole, Mere Green, Meriden, Merridale, Merry Hill, Minworth, Monmore Green, Moseley, Mount Nod, Moxley

== N ==
Nechells, New Frankley, New Oscott, Newbridge, Newtown, New Town Row Northfield

== O ==
Oakham, Ocker Hill, Old Hill, Old Oscott, Oldswinford, Oldbury, Olton, Oscott

== P ==
Palfrey, Park Hall, Park Village, Pedmore, Pelham, Pelsall, Penn, Penn Fields, Pensnett, Pendeford, Perry Barr, Perry Beeches, Perry Common, Pheasey, Pleck, Portobello, Princes End, Pype Hayes

== Q ==
Quarry Bank, Queslett, Quinton

== R ==
Radford, Ramshorn, Rednal, Ridgacre, Roughley, Rowley Regis, Rushall, Russells Hall Estate, Ryecroft

== S ==
Saltley, Sandwell, Sarehole, Sedgley, Selly Oak, Selly Park, Shard End, Sheldon, Shelfield, Shelsley Walsh, Shenley, Shenley Green, Shire Oak, Shirley, Short Heath, Signal Hayes, Silhill, Small Heath, Smethwick, Smithfield, Smith's Wood, Soho, Solihull, Solihull Lodge, Southside, South Yardley, Sparkbrook, Sparkhill, Spon End, Springfield, Stechford, Stirchley, Stockland Green, Stoke, Stoke Heath, Stoke Aldermoor, Stourbridge,Streetly, Sutton Coldfield

== T ==
Temple Balsall, Tettenhall, Tettenhall Wood, The Delves, Thimble End, Tidbury Green, Tile Hill, Tipton, Tividale, Tower Hill, Turves Green, Tutbury, Tyburn, Tyseley

== U ==
Upper Gornal

== V ==
Vauxhall

== W ==
Wake Green, Wall Heath, Walmley, Walsall, Walsall Town Centre, Walsall Wood, Walsgrave-On-Sowe, Ward End, Warley, Warstock, Washwood Heath, Wednesbury, Wednesfield, Weoley Castle, West Bromwich, West Heath, Westside, Westwood Heath, Whitehouse Common, Whitley, Whitlock's End, Whitmore Reans, Whoberley, Wightwick, Willenhall (Coventry), Willenhall (West Midlands), Winson Green, Withymoor Village, Witton, Wollaston, Wollescote, Wolverhampton, Wolverhampton City Centre, Wood End (Coventry), Wood End (Wolverhampton), Woodgate, Woodsetton, Wordsley, Wren's Nest, Wyken, Wylde Green

== Y ==
Yardley, Yardley Wood, Yew Tree

== See also ==
- List of places in England
