= List of areas in Birmingham =

This is a list of the constituent towns, villages and areas of Birmingham (both the city and the metropolitan borough) in England.

Between 1889 and 1995, the city boundaries were expanded to include many places which were once towns or villages in their own right, many of which still retain a distinctive character. The most recent of these additions are Sutton Coldfield, a borough in its own right until 1974, and New Frankley, transferred from Bromsgrove in 1995.

- Acocks Green
- Alum Rock
- Ashted
- Aston
- Aston Cross
- Austin Village
- Balsall Heath
- Balti Triangle
- Bartley Green
- Beech Lanes
- Billesley
- Birches Green
- Birchfield
- Birmingham Chinatown
- Birmingham City Centre
- Boldmere
- Bordesley
- Bordesley Green
- Bournbrook
- Bournville
- Brandwood End
- Brindleyplace
- Bromford
- Browns Green
- Buckland End
- California
- Camp Hill
- Castle Vale
- Chad Valley
- Churchfield
- Cofton Common
- Cotteridge
- Deritend
- Digbeth
- Doe Bank
- Driffold
- Druids Heath
- Duddeston
- Eastside
- Edgbaston
- Erdington
- Falcon Lodge
- Five Ways
- Four Oaks
- Fox Hollies
- Frankley
- Garretts Green
- Gib Heath
- Gilbertstone
- Glebe Farm
- Gosta Green
- Gravelly Hill
- Great Barr
- Greet
- Grimstock Hill
- Gun Quarter
- Hall Green
- Hamstead
- Handsworth
- Handsworth Wood
- Harborne
- Harts Green
- Haslucks Green
- Hawkesley
- Hay Mills
- High Heath
- Highgate
- Highter's Heath
- Hill Hook
- Hill Wood
- Hockley
- Hodge Hill
- Jewellery Quarter
- Kents Moat
- Kings Heath
- Kings Norton
- Kingstanding
- Kitts Green
- Ladywood
- Lea Hall
- Lee Bank
- Ley Hill
- Lifford
- Little Bromwich
- Lodge Hill
- Longbridge
- Lozells
- Lyndon Green
- Maney
- Maypole
- Minworth
- Mere Green
- Moor Green
- Moseley
- Nechells
- New Frankley
- New Oscott
- Newtown
- Northfield
- Old Oscott
- Over Green
- Peddimore
- Park Hall
- Pelham
- Perry Barr
- Perry Beeches
- Perry Common
- Pheasey
- Pype Hayes
- Queslett
- Quinton
- Reddicap Heath
- Rednal
- Ridgacre
- Rotton Park
- Roughley
- Rubery
- Saltley
- Sarehole
- Selly Oak
- Selly Park
- Shard End
- Sheldon
- Shenley Fields
- Shenley Green
- Short Heath
- Showell Green
- Small Heath
- Smithfield
- Soho
- Solihull
- Southside
- South Yardley
- South Woodgate
- Sparkbrook
- Sparkhill
- Springfield
- Spring Vale
- Stechford
- Stirchley
- Stockfield
- Stockland Green
- Streetly
- Sutton Coldfield
- The Leverrets
- Theatreland
- Thimble End
- Tile Cross
- Tower Hill
- Tudor Hill
- Turves Green
- Tyburn
- Tyseley
- Vauxhall
- Wake Green
- Walker's Heath
- Walmley
- Ward End
- Warstock
- Washwood Heath
- Wells Green
- Weoley Hill
- Weoley Castle
- West Heath
- Westside
- Wiggins Hill
- Whitehouse Common
- Winson Green
- Witton
- Woodcock Hill
- Woodgate
- Wylde Green
- Yardley
- Yardley Wood
