= B postcode area =

Postcode area within the United Kingdom

Birmingham
- Postcode area
- Location within the United Kingdom
- Coordinates: 52.463°N 1.889°W
- Sovereign state: United Kingdom
- Postcode area: B
- Postcode area name: Birmingham
- Post towns: 15
- Postcode districts: 79
- Postcode sectors: 268
- Postcodes (live): 41,397
- Postcodes (total): 61,202
- Statistics as at May 2020

The B postcode area, also known as the Birmingham postcode area, is a group of 79 postcode districts in central England, within 15 post towns. These include all of Birmingham, West Bromwich, Smethwick, Solihull, Halesowen, Cradley Heath, Oldbury and Rowley Regis), plus north-east Worcestershire (including Bromsgrove and Redditch), north and west Warwickshire (including Alcester, Studley and Henley-in-Arden), and part of south-east Staffordshire (including Tamworth) and a very small part of Leicestershire. It is the most populated postcode area in the United Kingdom, with a population of over 1.9 million. Towns that have the B post code are not part of the Birmingham area despite sharing the same postal code.

== Coverage ==
The approximate coverage of the postcode districts:

=== B1-B48: Birmingham post town ===
Postcode district	Post town	Coverage	Local authority area(s)
B1	BIRMINGHAM	Birmingham City Centre, Broad Street (east), Jewellery Quarter	Birmingham
B2	BIRMINGHAM	Birmingham City Centre, New Street	Birmingham
B3	BIRMINGHAM	Birmingham City Centre, Newhall Street	Birmingham
B4	BIRMINGHAM	Birmingham City Centre, Corporation Street (north), Aston University	Birmingham
B5	BIRMINGHAM	Digbeth, Highgate, Lee Bank, Edgbaston	Birmingham
B6	BIRMINGHAM	Aston, Birchfield, Witton	Birmingham
B7	BIRMINGHAM	Nechells, Vauxhall, Ashted, Duddeston	Birmingham
B8	BIRMINGHAM	Washwood Heath, Ward End, Saltley, Alum Rock, Pelham	Birmingham
B9	BIRMINGHAM	Bordesley Green, Bordesley, Small Heath	Birmingham
B10	BIRMINGHAM	Small Heath, Hay Mills	Birmingham
B11	BIRMINGHAM	Sparkhill, Sparkbrook, Tyseley, Greet	Birmingham
B12	BIRMINGHAM	Balsall Heath, Sparkbrook, Highgate, Deritend	Birmingham
B13	BIRMINGHAM	Moseley, Billesley, Moor Green	Birmingham
B14	BIRMINGHAM	Kings Heath, Yardley Wood, Druids Heath, Highter's Heath, Warstock, Maypole	Birmingham
B15	BIRMINGHAM	Edgbaston, Westside	Birmingham
B16	BIRMINGHAM	Ladywood, Edgbaston, Rotton Park	Birmingham
B17	BIRMINGHAM	Harborne, Edgbaston, Moor Pool	Birmingham
B18	BIRMINGHAM	Winson Green, Hockley, Soho	Birmingham
B19	BIRMINGHAM	Lozells and East Handsworth, Lozells, Newtown, Birchfield, Gib Hill, Hockley	Birmingham
B20	BIRMINGHAM	Handsworth Wood, Handsworth, Birchfield, Browns Green	Birmingham
B21	BIRMINGHAM	Handsworth	Birmingham
B23	BIRMINGHAM	Erdington, Stockland Green, Short Heath, Perry Common, Gravelly Hill, Upper Witton, Short Heath	Birmingham
B24	BIRMINGHAM	Erdington, Wylde Green, Tyburn, Bromford, Gravelly Hill	Birmingham
B25	BIRMINGHAM	Yardley, Hay Mills	Birmingham
B26	BIRMINGHAM	Sheldon, Yardley, Birmingham Airport, Gilbertstone, Lyndon Green, Elmdon	Birmingham, Solihull
B27	BIRMINGHAM	Acocks Green	Birmingham
B28	BIRMINGHAM	Hall Green, Haslucks Green, Yardley Wood	Birmingham
B29	BIRMINGHAM	Selly Oak, Bournbrook, Selly Park, Weoley Castle, Shenley Green, California, Moor Green	Birmingham
B30	BIRMINGHAM	Bournville, Cotteridge, Stirchley, Kings Norton	Birmingham
B31	BIRMINGHAM	Northfield, Longbridge, West Heath, Shenley Green, Frankley, Bartley Green	Birmingham
B32	BIRMINGHAM	Woodgate, Bartley Green, Quinton, California, Frankley, Frankley Green	Birmingham
B33	BIRMINGHAM	Kitts Green, Stechford, Lea Hall, Garretts Green, Lyndon Green	Birmingham
B34	BIRMINGHAM	Shard End, Buckland End	Birmingham
B35	BIRMINGHAM	Castle Vale	Birmingham
B36	BIRMINGHAM	Castle Bromwich, Smith's Wood, Bromford, Hodge Hill, Washwood Heath	Birmingham, Solihull
B37	BIRMINGHAM	Chelmsley Wood, Marston Green, Kingshurst, Fordbridge	Solihull
B38	BIRMINGHAM	Kings Norton, Hawkesley, Headley Heath, Forhill	Birmingham
B40	BIRMINGHAM	National Exhibition Centre, Birmingham Airport, Resorts World, Marston Green, Bickenhill	Solihull
B42	BIRMINGHAM	Perry Barr, Great Barr, Hamstead	Birmingham
B43	BIRMINGHAM	Great Barr, Hamstead, Pheasey, Newton	Birmingham, Sandwell, Walsall
B44	BIRMINGHAM	Perry Barr, Kingstanding, Great Barr, Old Oscott, Queslett	Birmingham
B45	BIRMINGHAM	Rednal, New Frankley, Rubery, Cofton Hackett, Barnt Green, Lickey, Longbridge, Northfield, Apes Dale	Birmingham, Bromsgrove
B46	BIRMINGHAM	Coleshill, Water Orton, Shustoke, Nether Whitacre, Blyth End, Furnace End, Duke End, Maxstoke, Lea Marston, Castle Vale	North Warwickshire
B47	BIRMINGHAM	Hollywood, Wythall	Bromsgrove
B48	BIRMINGHAM	Alvechurch, Cobley Hill, Rowney Green, Portway, Weatheroak Hill, Lea End, Arrowfield Top, Barnt Green	Bromsgrove
B99	BIRMINGHAM		non-geographic

=== B49-61; B80-B98: South and east of Birmingham ===
Postcode district	Post town	Coverage	Local authority area(s)
B49	ALCESTER	Alcester, Shelfield, Shelfield Green, Aston Cantlow, Great Alne, Walcote, Upton, Temple Grafton, Wixford, Wood Bevington, Weethley, Cookhill, New End, Coughton, Kings Coughton, Arrow, Kinwarton	Stratford-on-Avon
B50	ALCESTER	Bidford-on-Avon, Broom, Wixford, Temple Grafton, Barton, Bickmarsh	Stratford-on-Avon
B60	BROMSGROVE	Bromsgrove, Stoke Prior, Charford	Bromsgrove
B61	BROMSGROVE	Bromsgrove, Dodford, Catshill, Bournheath, Fairfield	Bromsgrove
B80	STUDLEY	Studley, Green Lane, Mappleborough Green, Outhill, Morton Bagot, Spernall	Stratford-on-Avon
B90	SOLIHULL	Shirley, Solihull Lodge, Major's Green, Dickens Heath, Cheswick Green, Shelly Green, Blossomfield, Hollywood	Solihull, Bromsgrove
B91	SOLIHULL	Solihull, Blossomfield, Worlds End, Catherine-de-Barnes	Solihull
B92	SOLIHULL	Olton, Elmdon, Bickenhill, Hampton-in-Arden, Barston	Solihull
B93	SOLIHULL	Baddesley Clinton, Bentley Heath, Dorridge, Knowle, Tilehouse Green, Oldwich Lane, Chadwick End	Solihull
B94	SOLIHULL	Hockley Heath, Earlswood, Trap's Green, Aspley Heath, Wood End, Portway	Solihull, Warwick, Stratford-on-Avon
B95	HENLEY-IN-ARDEN	Henley-in-Arden, Wooton Wawen, Beaudesert, Finwood, High Cross, Preston Green, Langley, Edstone, Aston Cantlow, Oldberrow, Gorcott Hill, Ullenhall, Buckley Green	Stratford-on-Avon
B96	REDDITCH	Feckenham, Astwood Bank, Bradley Green, Sambourne, Edgiock, New End, Holberrow Green, Stock Green	Redditch
B97	REDDITCH	Redditch, Callow Hill, Webheath, Ham Green, Elcocks Brook, Crumpfield, Hewell Grange, Tardebigge, Lower Bentley	Redditch
B98	REDDITCH	Redditch, Beoley, Aspley Heath, Trap's Green, Gorcott Hill, Mappleborough Green	Redditch

=== B62-B71: The Black Country ===
Postcode district	Post town	Coverage	Local authority area(s)
B62	HALESOWEN	Halesowen, Romsley, Hunnington, Quinton	Dudley, Bromsgrove, Birmingham
B63	HALESOWEN	Halesowen, Hayley Green, Hasbury, Cradley	Dudley, Bromsgrove
B64	CRADLEY HEATH	Cradley Heath, Old Hill, Haden Cross	Sandwell
B65	ROWLEY REGIS	Rowley Regis, Blackheath, Coombeswood, Brades	Sandwell
B66	SMETHWICK	Smethwick, Bearwood, Warley, Rood End	Sandwell
B67	SMETHWICK	Smethwick, Bearwood, Londonderry, Rood End	Sandwell
B68	OLDBURY	Langley, Brandhall, Quinton, Londonderry, Causeway Green, Bristnall Fields, Rood End	Sandwell
B69	OLDBURY	Oldbury, Tividale, Brades, Langley, Oakham	Sandwell
B70	WEST BROMWICH	West Bromwich, Lyng, Swan Village, Golds Green, Balls Hill, Guns Village	Sandwell
B71	WEST BROMWICH	West Bromwich, Balls Hill, Stone Cross	Sandwell

=== B72-B79: North of Birmingham ===
Postcode district	Post town	Coverage	Local authority area(s)
B72	SUTTON COLDFIELD	Sutton Coldfield town centre, Maney, Wylde Green, The Parade, Driffold	Birmingham
B73	SUTTON COLDFIELD	Boldmere, Oscott, Wylde Green, The Parade, Driffold	Birmingham
B74	SUTTON COLDFIELD	Four Oaks, Little Aston, Streetly, Hill Hook, Mere Green, Hardwick	Birmingham, Lichfield, Walsall
B75	SUTTON COLDFIELD	Mere Green, Roughley, Moor Hall, Whitehouse Common, Falcon Lodge, Canwell Hall, Bassets Pole	Birmingham
B76	SUTTON COLDFIELD	Walmley, Minworth, Curdworth, Lea Marston, Wishaw, Bodymoor Heath	Birmingham, North Warwickshire
B77	TAMWORTH	Tamworth, Wilnecote, Amington, Belgrave, Glascote, Glascote Hill, Stonydelph, Hockley, Dosthill, Whateley	Tamworth, North Warwickshire
B78	TAMWORTH	Tamworth, Fazeley, Kingsbury, Polesworth, Hopwas, Dordon	Tamworth, Lichfield, North Warwickshire
B79	TAMWORTH	Tamworth, Warton, Hopwas, Comberford, Elford, Edingale, Harlaston, Haunton, Thorpe Constantine, Newton Regis, Shuttington, Alvecote, Borough Park, Lichfield Road Industrial Estate	Tamworth, North Warwickshire, North West Leicestershire, Lichfield

== Notes ==
- The B postcode area as a whole, is the largest by population.
- B1 1AA is Birmingham Head Post office; this is no longer in the B1 area, but retains the B1 code.
- B1 1BB is Birmingham Council House

== Maps ==
B postcode area map, showing postcode districts in red and post towns in grey text, with links to nearby CV, DE, DY, ST, WR, WS and WV postcode areas.

Detailed map of postcode districts in central Birmingham

== Former scheme ==
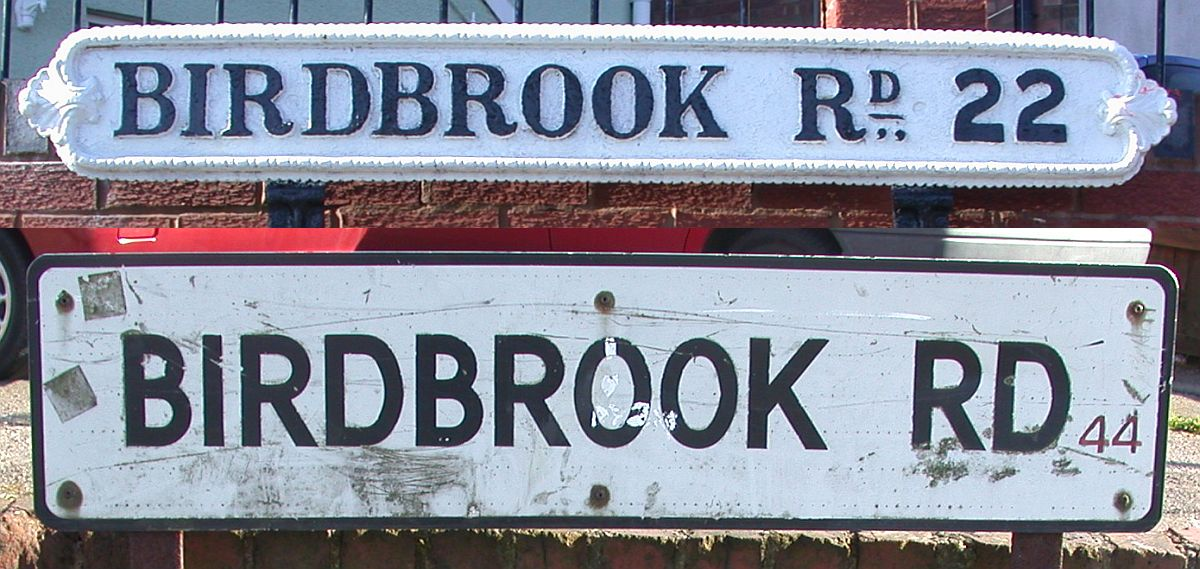
Street name signs on Birdbrook Road, Great Barr, Birmingham, showing old "Birmingham 22" (top) and modern "B44" postcodes.

Before the introduction of postcodes in the 1960s, Birmingham along with other major cities were divided into numbered postal districts. With a few exceptions these were directly incorporated into the outcode (the first part of the postcode).

For example, Great Barr was formerly Birmingham 22 (now B43 and 44) and Smethwick was formerly Smethwick 40 and 41 (now B66 and 67).

== See also ==
- List of postcode areas in the United Kingdom
- Postcode Address File
