= Spernall =

Village in Warwickshire, England

Coordinates: 52.258°N 1.875°W

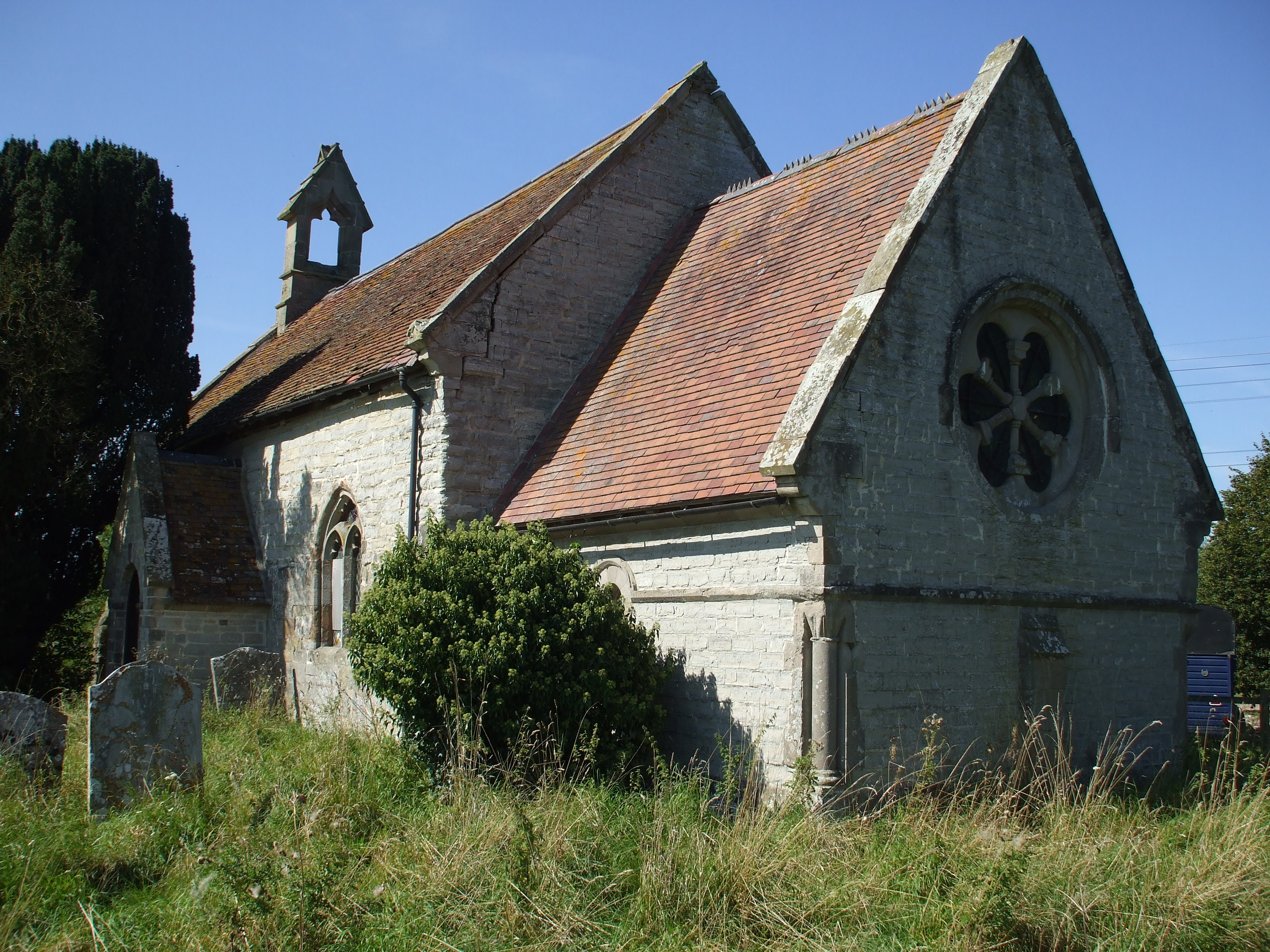
- St Leonard's Church

- Location within Warwickshire
- Population: 153 (2001 Census)
- OS grid reference: SP086621
  - London: 113 miles
- Civil parish: Spernall
- District: Stratford-on-Avon
- Shire county: Warwickshire
- Region: West Midlands
- Country: England
- Sovereign state: United Kingdom
- Post town: STUDLEY
- Postcode district: B80
- Dialling code: 01527
- Police: Warwickshire
- Fire: Warwickshire
- Ambulance: West Midlands
- UK Parliament: Stratford-on-Avon

Spernall is a remote village 4 miles (6.4 km) north of Alcester in the parish of Oldberrow, Morton Bagot, and Spernall, in the Stratford-on-Avon District of Warwickshire, England. In the 2001 Census it had a population of 153. It is situated on the banks of the small River Arrow, the name meaning Spera's border. Early forms of the name are Spernore. and Spernoure in the 1327 Subsidy Roll. The village consists only of the church and rectory and a few scattered farms and cottages. At some time between 1195 and 1361 the parish was largely depopulated by pestilence, so that many of the villein tenements, which had hitherto accounted for almost the whole population, came into the hands of freemen. This may well refer to the Black Death; the priest at Spernall, Nicholas atte Yate, died in 1349 and there was another institution in 1351. In the 17th century the population seems to have mainly consisted of substantial farmers, for in 1625 it is described as a place with 'few or no poor at all in it and many wealthy inhabitants', and the Hearth Tax returns (1662–74) show the high average of about 2.5 hearths per house. By 1696, there were only two yeomen with an estate of £10 a year or more.

== History ==
The Domesday Book of 1086 records it as being part of the Land of William Bonvallett, stating Hugh holds 2 hides at Spernall from William. Land for 4 ploughs. In lordship 1; 4 villagers and 7 smallholders with 3 ploughs. A mill at 4s and 7 sticks of eels; meadow, 8 acres (32,000 m^{2}); woodland 3 furlongs long and 1 wide.

== Economy ==
Whilst mostly agricultural Spernall also contains a large water treatment works on the River Arrow. The Purity Brewing Co are located at The Brewery, Upper Spernall Farm, manufacturing their Pure Gold, Pure UBU and Mad Goose ales.

== Notable buildings ==
The Church of St Leonard is small stone building consisting of a chancel, rebuilt in 1844 when the church was restored, nave, south porch and a western bell turret containing one bell. The church has been closed since 1972, and is now owned by the Friends of Friendless Churches and tenanted. The survey of the clergy by the puritans in 1586 described the Rector Humphrey Style thus; "Humfrie Stile 'parson dumbe and unlearned a common alehousehaunter and of suspected life : Value xx markes by the yeare".

== Governance ==
Spernall is part of the Studley with Mappleborough Green ward of Stratford-on-Avon District Council and represented by Councillor Justin Kerridge, of the Conservative Party. Nationally it is part of Stratford-on-Avon parliamentary constituency, whose current MP following the 2010 election is Nadhim Zahawi Conservative. Prior to Brexit in 2020 it was part of the West Midlands electoral region of the European Parliament.
