= Gorcott Hill =

Hamlet in Warwickshire, England

Coordinates: 52.31458°N 1.86771°W

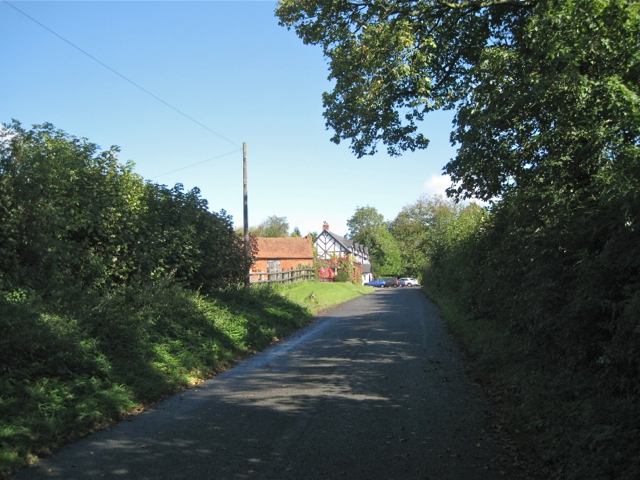
- Towards the Hollybush

- Location within Warwickshire
- OS grid reference: SP091685
- Civil parish: Tanworth-in-Arden
- District: Stratford-on-Avon
- Shire county: Warwickshire
- Region: West Midlands
- Country: England
- Sovereign state: United Kingdom
- Post town: REDDITCH
- Postcode district: B98
- Dialling code: 01527
- Police: Warwickshire
- Fire: Warwickshire
- Ambulance: West Midlands
- UK Parliament: Stratford-on-Avon

Gorcott Hill is a hamlet in the civil parish of Tanworth-in-Arden, in the Stratford-on-Avon district, in the county of Warwickshire, England. It is near the villages of Mappleborough Green & Studley, which are both in Warwickshire. Gorcott Hill is also near the large Worcestershire town of Redditch.
