= Eric Barber (cricketer) =

English cricketer

Personal information
- Full name: Eric George Barber
- Born: 22 July 1915; Bishopsgate Green, Warwickshire, England
- Died: 3 April 1995 (aged 79); Coventry, Warwickshire, England
- Batting: Right-handed

Domestic team information
- Years: Team
- 1936: Warwickshire

Career statistics
Competition	First-class
Matches	2
Runs scored	31
Batting average	10.33
100s/50s	–/–
Top score	13
Balls bowled	–
Wickets	–
Bowling average	–
5 wickets in innings	–
10 wickets in match	–
Best bowling	–
Catches/stumpings	2/–
- Source: Cricinfo, 25 December 2011

Eric George Barber (22 July 1915 – 30 April 1995) was an English cricketer. Barber was a right-handed batsman. He was born at Bishopsgate Green, Warwickshire.

Barber made two first-class appearances for Warwickshire against Derbyshire and Leicestershire in the 1936 County Championship. Against Derbyshire, Barber was dismissed for 13 in Warwickshire's first-innings by Leslie Townsend, with Warwickshire making 109 all out in response to Derbyshire's first-innings total of 318. Warwickshire were forced to follow-on in their second-innings, with Barber scoring 9 runs before he was again dismissed by Townsend. Warwickshire could only manage a total of 199, which gave Derbyshire victory by an innings and 10 runs. Against Leicestershire, Barber was dismissed by Ewart Astill for 9 runs in Warwickshire's first-innings total of 266, made in response to Leicestershire's first-innings total of 288. Leicestershire made 102/5 in their second-innings, with the match ending in a draw. These were his only major appearances for Warwickshire.

He died at Coventry, Warwickshire on 30 April 1995.
