= Morton Bagot =

Village in Warwickshire, England

Coordinates: 52.28118°N 1.83652°W

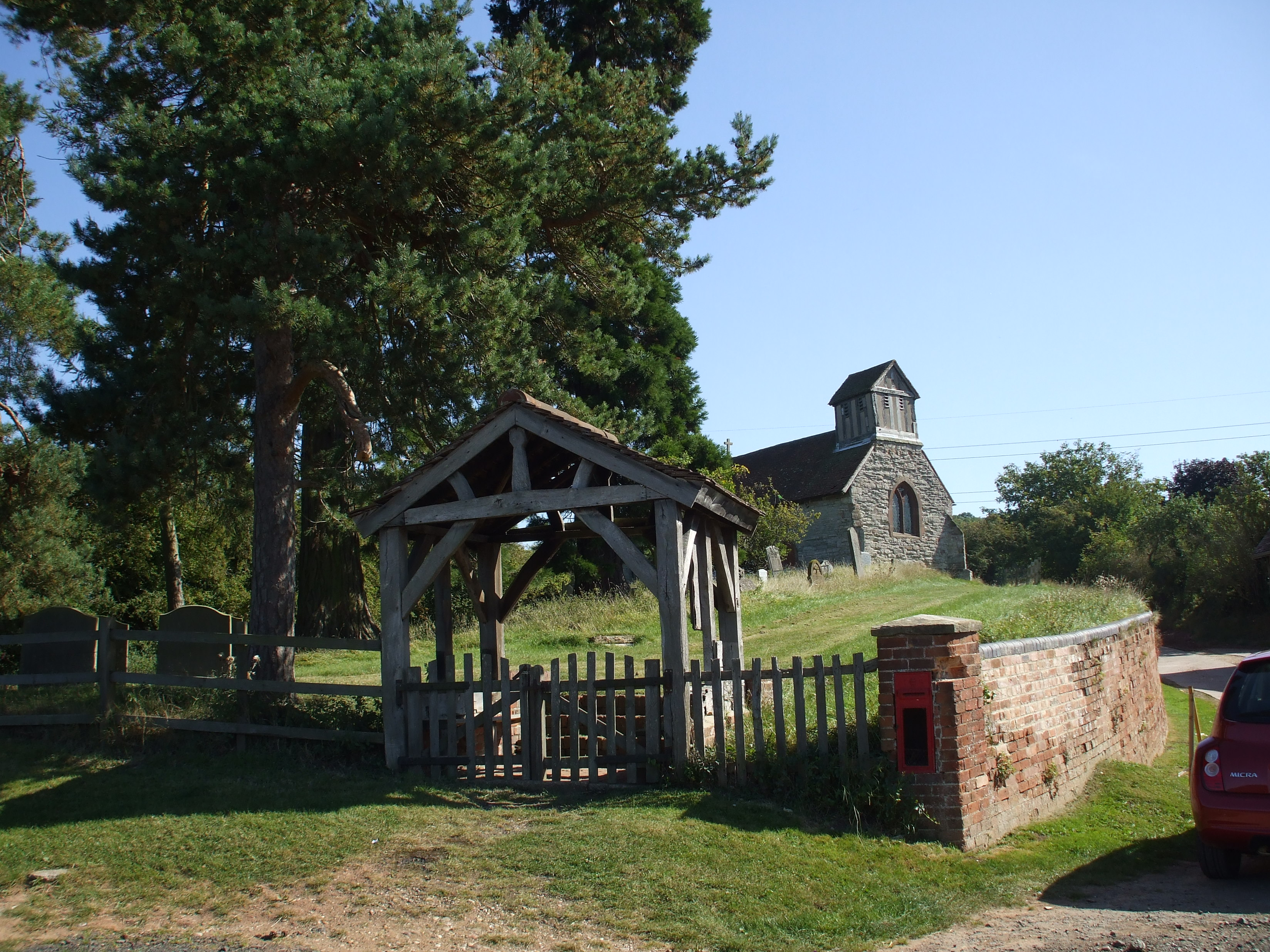
- Holy Trinity Church and Lych gate

- Location within Warwickshire
- Population: 153 (2001 Census)
- OS grid reference: SP11366460
- District: Stratford-on-Avon
- Shire county: Warwickshire
- Region: West Midlands
- Country: England
- Sovereign state: United Kingdom
- Post town: Studley
- Postcode district: B80
- Dialling code: 01527
- Police: Warwickshire
- Fire: Warwickshire
- Ambulance: West Midlands
- UK Parliament: Stratford-on-Avon

Morton Bagot is a small village in the Stratford-on-Avon District of Warwickshire, England. It lies about 1.5 miles (2 km) east of the Birmingham-Alcester road, the modern A435 and Roman road Ryknild Street, 6.5 miles (10 km) north of Alcester, 9.5 miles (15 km) from Stratford-upon-Avon and 12 miles from Warwick, across the valley of a small brook, flowing south-east to join the River Arrow.

A road from Oldberrow to Spernall runs north and south through the middle of the parish of Morton Bagot, Oldberrow and Spernall, past the church. The elevation varies from 200 feet (61 m) to 400 feet (120 m), the highest point being at Bannum's Wood. There is no main village and there has been considerable depopulation here since the 18th century. In the 2001 Census the whole parish had a population of 153.

== Etymology ==
The name "Morton Bagot" means the settlement of the moorland, the Bagot element coming from the name of the lords of the manor who added their name when they came into possession during the reign of Henry II.

== History ==
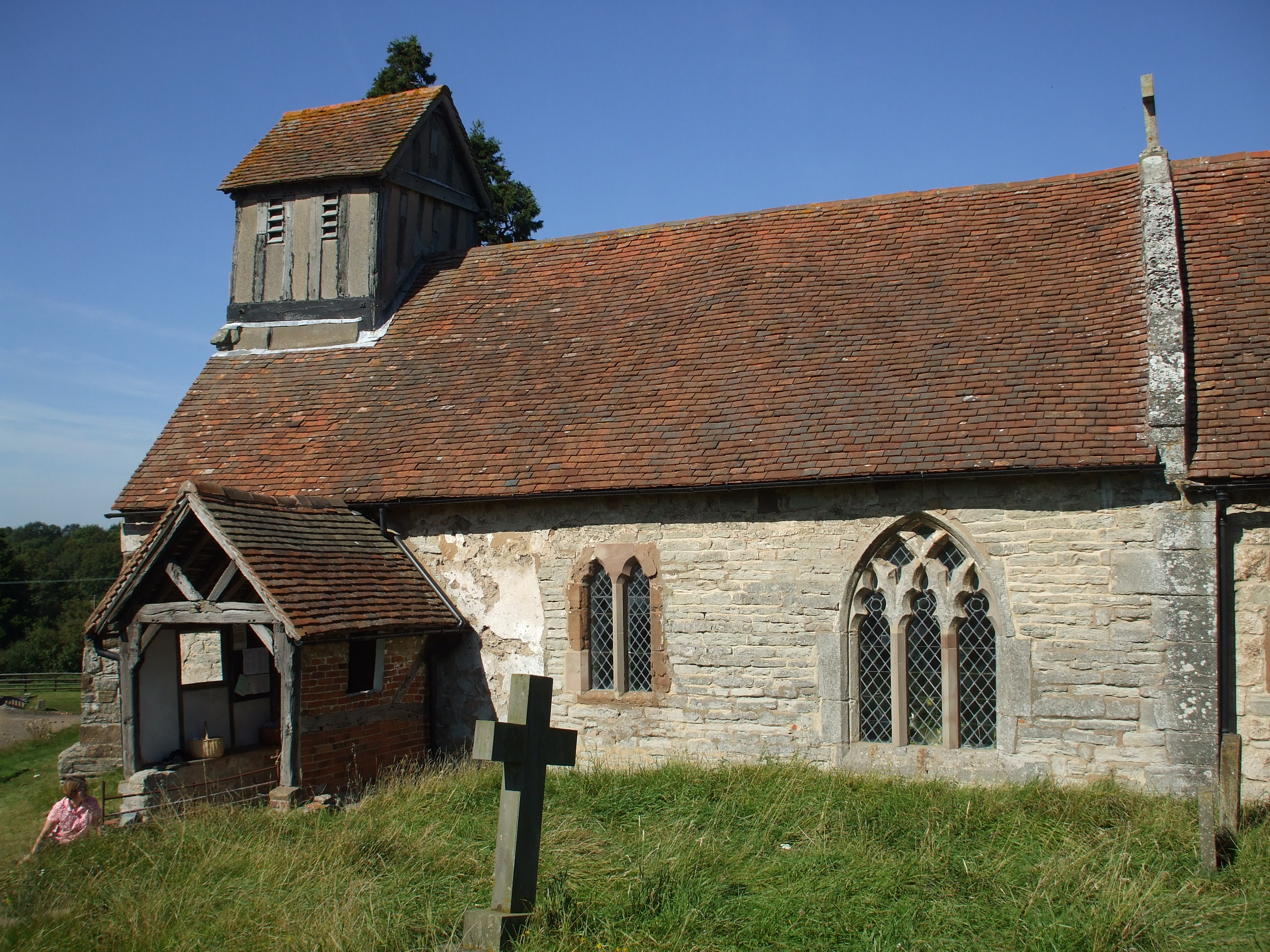
Holy Trinity Church

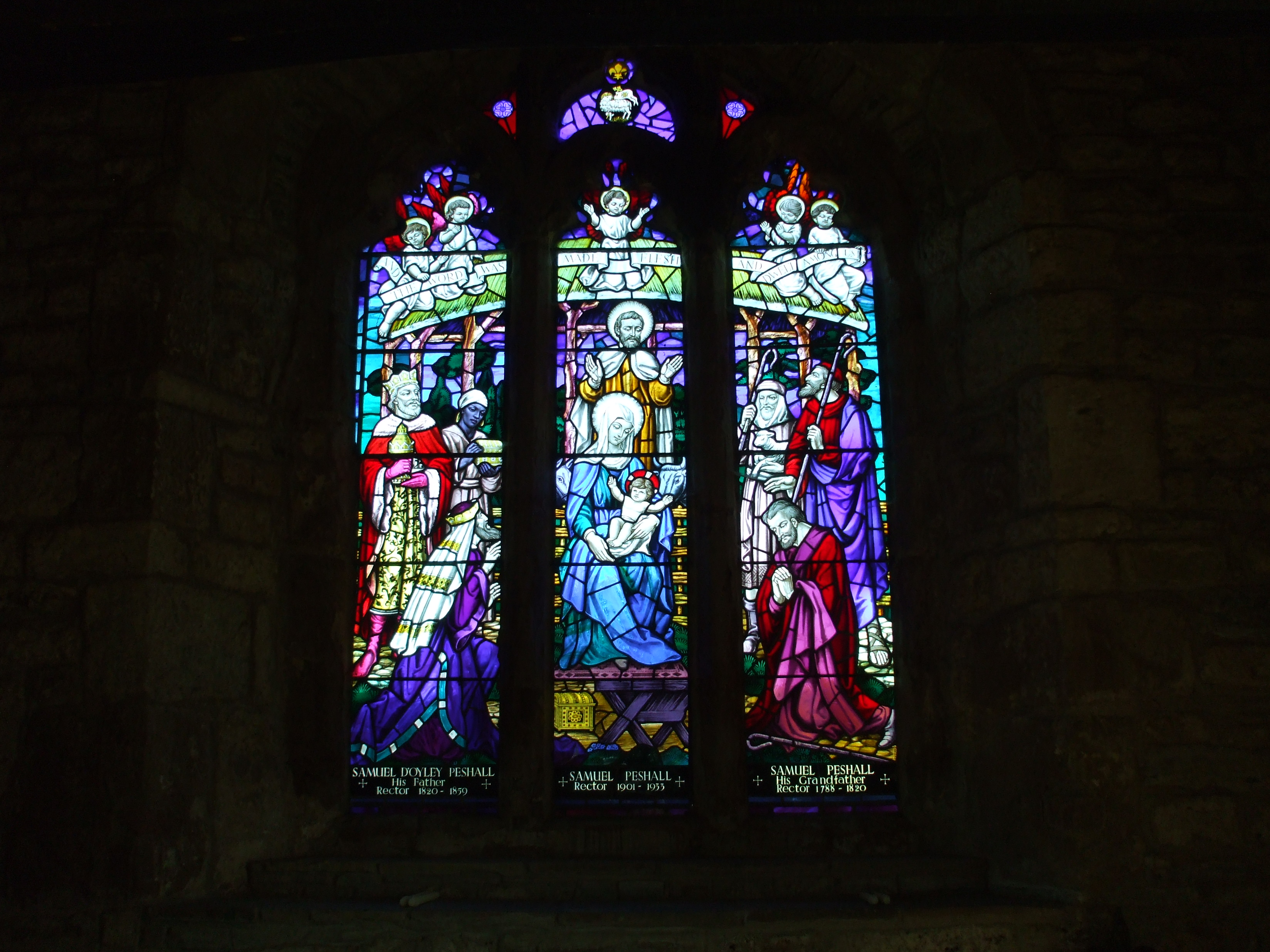
The East Window

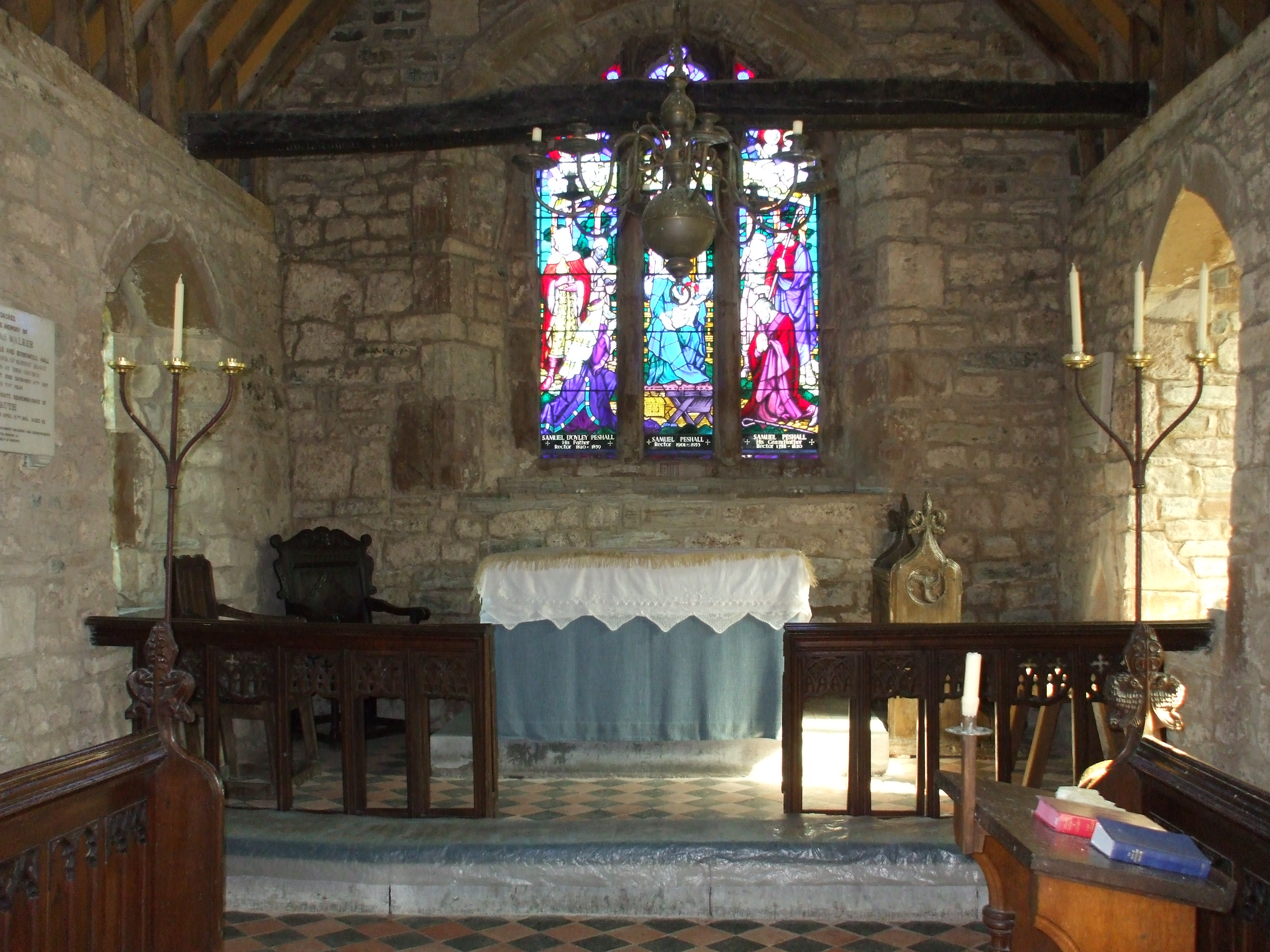
The Chancel

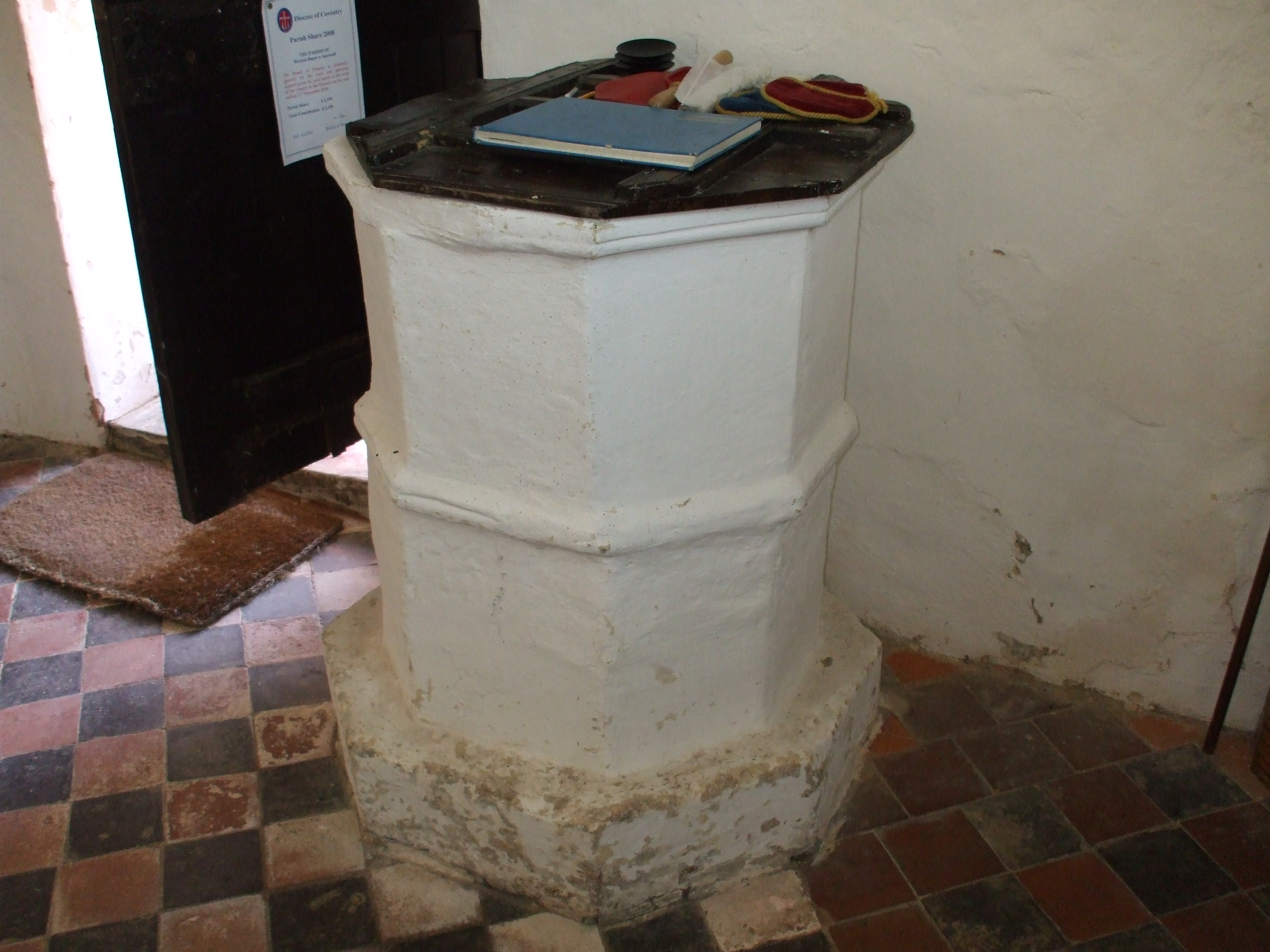
The Font

Morton Bagot is recorded in the Domesday Book as part of the land of Robert de Stafford as follows " in Ferncombe Hundred, Hugh holds 2 hides in Mortone (Bagot). Land for 4 ploughs. In lordship 1; 2 slaves; 5 villagers and 5 smallholders with 2 ploughs. Meadow, 3 furlongs long and 6 perches wide; woodland ½ league long 1 furlong wide. The value was 30s; now 50s. Grimulf held it freely." William Dugdale however states that it was part of the possessions of Waga of Wooton Wawen whose lands there were also given to de Stafford. Robert de Stafford was descended from the de Tonei family and had fought stoutly with William the Conqueror against Harold Godwinson as a result he had this and other lands bestowed on him. He made Stafford his principal seat, where he had a strong castle and assumed his surname from thence.

There were two principal manors, Morton, and Morton Bagot. The Bagots apparently held the manor of Morton until 1296, when William Bagot the younger conveyed it to Roger de Conyngesby and Joan his wife, with the reversion of land held for life by Henry Bagot. In 1303 Roger de Conyngesby was granted free warren in his demesne lands of Morton Bagot. In 1316 Morton Bagot, with the hamlets of Spernall, Offord, and others were recorded as being held by William Trussell, Roger de Conyngesby, and Thomas Durvassall. To a subsidy of 1327, John Trussell was assessed for land here at 4s. 5½d., Edmund Trussell at 3s. 4d., and John Conyngesby at 4s. 5½d. John Conyngesby, son of Roger, disputed with the Prior and Convent of Kenilworth the patronage of Morton Bagot church in 1333, and was a commissioner to administer the Statute of Labourers some twenty years later.

In 1365 William Conyngesby son of John Conyngesby of Morton Bagot occurs in connexion with lands in Ullenhall. William had no legitimate male hier and the manor passed through his sister to her granddaughter, Alice, the wife of Richard Archer, who in 1436 made a settlement of the manor and advowson on herself and her heirs. Alice died in 1461 without issue, and her cousin, Thomas Conyngesby, claimed the manor as heir. A dispute then arose with claims that Thomas was no cousin of Alice, since his great-grandfather Thomas was the bastard son of William, and that William had no such brother John, now claimed to be great-grandfather of Alice. Thomas evidently established his claim and so it continued in this family.

In 1536 the manor was conveyed from Humphrey Conyngesby to Richard Conyngesby for life, and then to Richard's eldest son, Humphrey, for life, with reversion to the sons of the elder Humphrey. The latter's son John died in 1567, and his son Humphrey, in 1593, conveyed the manor to Nicholas Conyngesby. The last member of the family to hold the manor seems to have been Thomas Coningsby, who in 1629 sold it to Richard Butler and William Gibbons. The subsequent descent is obscure. It seems to have passed from William Hichinson and Lettice his wife to John Tumbrell in 1676. Andrew Archer, (possibly a relation of the aforementioned Richard & Alice) occurs as lord of the manor in 1719 and 1721. Probably the estate subsequently became merged in the second manor. In 1805 The Times noted with some amusement that the local priest had dislocated his jaw when attempting a particularly loud Amen.

== Governance ==
Morton Bagot is part of the Sambourne ward of Stratford-on-Avon District Council and represented by Councillor Justin Kerridge, of the Conservative Party. Nationally it is part of Stratford-on-Avon parliamentary constituency, whose current MP following the 2010 general election is Nadhim Zahawi of the Conservative Party. Prior to Brexit in 2020, it was part of the West Midlands electoral region of the European Parliament.

== Notable buildings ==
The parish church of the Holy Trinity is a small building dating from the end of the 13th century, the list of Rectors begins in 1282 with Ralph Bagot. It stands on a mound with a steep bank to the south it is approached by way of a lych gate erected in 1936 by Canon Warren the then Rector, there are the remains of a post box set into an adjacent wall. The church consists of a chancel, nave, south porch and a small timbered bell-cote with old oak beams containing two bells, still rung today. These probably date to the early 16th century: the smaller, inscribed 'Sanctae Trinitas', is by an unknown founder; the other is inscribed with the name 'Maria' four times and has crosses, fleurs-de-lis, and king's heads as stops between them; it came from the Worcester foundry, probably by Nicholas Grene (died 1547).

In spite of Victorian restorations there remain some pre-Reformation features including window openings and a piscina with a plain ogee head and a very shallow basin cut off in front dating probably from the 14th century. The east wall may have been rebuilt and the west end of the nave extended in the 15th century, whilst the south porch, tiled roofs and bell-turret are of about 1600. The font is a plain octagonal stone, thickly colourwashed, with a moulding of the 13th century at the top and another at half height. It has a 16th-century flat wood cover with moulded cross-framing and pierced by two holes for the former staples. The Chancel contains two memorials, on the South side one to the Holyoake family, landowners in the 18th century, whilst the one on the North side is to Thomas Walker, of Studley Castle, Lord of the manor of Morton Bagot, who died in 1887.

There are a number of memorials in the church. The Nave contains an oak memorial to Lance Corporal, John Thomas Ross, 4th Battalion Royal Berkshire Regiment who died of wounds in France on 28 March 1918, aged 21. He is buried in Namps-Au-Val British cemetery, in the Department of the Somme, France. He was the son of Mrs. A. Ross, of Chuter Green, Morton Bagot. John Burman noted that the church was lit by candles and this is still true today giving Winter services a very individual spiritual feeling. Details and times of services can be found on the arden marches churches website . Behind the church there are earthworks which are believed to be the site of a castle or fortified manor house.

Traces of a moat near Church farm may perhaps mark the site of a building described in the 17th century as Lord Carington's Lodge House, which was then the largest house in the village but has now quite disappeared. When assessed for the hearth tax it had 7 hearths. The interior of the earthworks however, are occupied by a 17th-century timber framed barn that is contemporary with Church Farm. There is no surface evidence of an earlier building so the Victoria County History supposition that the earthworks were connected with Lodge House is questionable, but the position of moat close to the Church does implie a manorial origin. The size and depth of the earthworks suggests that this may be a small ring-motte. However, the barn standing on the site appears to be constructed out of earlier re-used material, so it is just possible that this could have been the site of Lodge House. The earthworks are a Scheduled Monument
