= Blossomfield =

Coordinates: 52.4104°N 1.7952°W

- Location within the West Midlands
- OS grid reference: SP134786
- Metropolitan borough: Solihull
- Metropolitan county: West Midlands
- Region: West Midlands
- Country: England
- Sovereign state: United Kingdom
- Post town: SOLIHULL
- Postcode district: B91
- Dialling code: 0121
- Police: West Midlands
- Fire: West Midlands
- Ambulance: West Midlands
- UK Parliament: Solihull

Blossomfield is a suburb of Solihull, West Midlands, England. It is the location of the main campus of Solihull College as well as Alderbrook School, Tudor Grange Academy and St Peter's Catholic School. It is situated around 1.5 miles south of Solihull town centre.
