= Holberrow Green =

Coordinates: 52.229762°N 1.966106°W

- Location within Worcestershire
- District: Wychavon
- Shire county: Worcestershire
- Region: West Midlands
- Country: England
- Sovereign state: United Kingdom
- Post town: Redditch
- Postcode district: B96
- Police: West Mercia
- Fire: Hereford and Worcester
- Ambulance: West Midlands

Holberrow Green is a village in Worcestershire, England.
