= Alderbrook School =

Coordinates: 52.406°N 1.797°W

Location
- Blossomfield Road; Solihull, West Midlands, B91 1SN; England

Information
- Type: Academy
- Motto: Ambition, Bravery, Kindness
- Established: 1974
- Local authority: Solihull
- Department for Education URN: 136994 Tables
- Ofsted: Reports
- Chair: David Evans
- Head teacher: Tom Beveridge
- Gender: Coeducational
- Age: 11 (Year 7) to 18 (Year 13)
- Enrollment: 1662
- Colours: Purple, Lime Green
- Website: https://www.alderbrookschool.co.uk/

Alderbrook School is a co-educational secondary school in Solihull, West Midlands. It shares grounds with the neighbouring schools of Tudor Grange Academy and St Peter's Catholic School.

== History ==
In 2004, David Miliband toured Alderbrook to promote the General National Vocational Qualifications (GNVQ).

The school was formed in 1974 from an amalgamation of Harold Malley Boys’ and Harold Cartwright Girls’ Grammar Schools. The school turned into an academy in August 2011.

It was announced during Summer 2014 that Alderbrook would open a Sixth Form, beginning to admit 16-18 students from September 2015. The first Year 12 cohort admitted 66 students.
