= Mappleborough Green =

Village in Warwickshire, England

Coordinates: 52.29°N 1.88°W

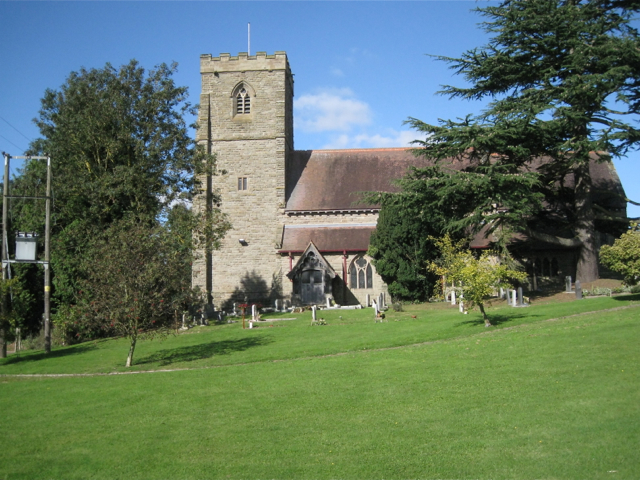

- Location within Warwickshire
- Population: 857 (2011)
- OS grid reference: SP079659
- Civil parish: Mappleborough Green
- District: Stratford-on-Avon
- Shire county: Warwickshire
- Region: West Midlands
- Country: England
- Sovereign state: United Kingdom
- Post town: STUDLEY
- Postcode district: B80
- Dialling code: 01527
- Police: Warwickshire
- Fire: Warwickshire
- Ambulance: West Midlands

Mappleborough Green is a small village and civil parish in Warwickshire, in the non-metropolitan district of Stratford-on-Avon. The village has a population of 540 and the civil parish 857.

Mappleborough Green lies on the extreme western edge of Warwickshire adjacent to Redditch and thus forming part of the county border with Worcestershire, and adjoins the parishes of Studley, Tanworth-in-Arden, Beoley, Morton Bagot and Oldberrow. The western edge of the parish is largely aligned with the A435 trunk road from Evesham to Birmingham.

== History ==
Although likely settled since around 1200CE, Mappleborough Green was part of the Studley estate until 1824. A church was built in the village in the Victorian era, financed by Sir William Jaffray Bart and remains in active use. A Wesleyan chapel in the village is no longer active. The civil parish was formed on 1 April 2004 from Studley.

== Business ==
Mappleborough Green is primarily rural. Local business includes farming and a concentration of garden centres. These and the parish's country pubs serve the much larger population of Redditch. The village also has a Chinese restaurant
