= Apes Dale =

Hamlet in Worcestershire, England

Coordinates: 52.3545°N 2.0189°W

- Location within Worcestershire
- OS grid reference: SO988729
- Civil parish: Lickey and Blackwell
- District: Bromsgrove
- Shire county: Worcestershire
- Region: West Midlands
- Country: England
- Sovereign state: United Kingdom
- Post town: Bromsgrove
- Postcode district: B60
- Police: West Mercia
- Fire: Hereford and Worcester
- Ambulance: West Midlands

Apes Dale is a hamlet situated in the parish of Lickey and Blackwell, in the Bromsgrove district of Worcestershire, England.
