= Studley High School =

- Studley High School Crest

Location
- Crooks Lane; Studley; Warwickshire, B80 7QX; England
- Coordinates: 52.2689°N 1.8981°W

Information
- Type: Academy
- Motto: Always Aiming Higher
- Local authority: Warwickshire
- Department for Education URN: 136786 Tables
- Ofsted: Reports
- Headteacher: Richard Eost
- Gender: Mixed
- Age: 11 to 16
- Enrolment: 795
- Colours: Maroon, Gold
- Website: www.studleyhighschool.org.uk

Studley High School is a mixed secondary school located in Studley in the English county of Warwickshire.

Previously a foundation school administered by Warwickshire County Council, Studley High School converted to academy status in June 2011. However the school continues to coordinate with Warwickshire County Council for admissions. The school offers GCSEs as programmes of study for pupils.
