= Tudor Hill =

Coordinates: 52.567808°N 1.831699°W

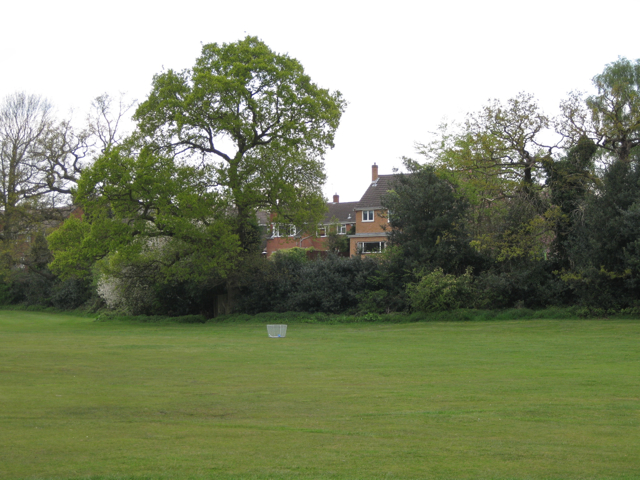

- Location within the West Midlands
- OS grid reference: SP116965
- Metropolitan borough: Birmingham
- Metropolitan county: West Midlands
- Region: West Midlands
- Country: England
- Sovereign state: United Kingdom
- Post town: SUTTON COLDFIELD
- Postcode district: B72 - B76
- Dialling code: 0121
- Police: West Midlands
- Fire: West Midlands
- Ambulance: West Midlands
- UK Parliament: Sutton Coldfield

Tudor Hill is a suburb of Sutton Coldfield, in the county of West Midlands, England.

The settlement lies on elevated land to the north-west of Sutton Coldfield, on the edge of Sutton Park, and is located approximately 0.5 miles (0.80 km) north-east the town centre.
