= Walcote, Warwickshire =

Village in Warwickshire, England

Coordinates: 52.22007°N 1.81552°W

Walcote is a village in Warwickshire, England, one mile south of the ancient Roman market town of Alcester. It consists of seventeen dwellings, ranging from a Victorian rectory to humble cottages.
