= Oldberrow =

Village in Warwickshire, England

Coordinates: 52.28°N 01.82°W

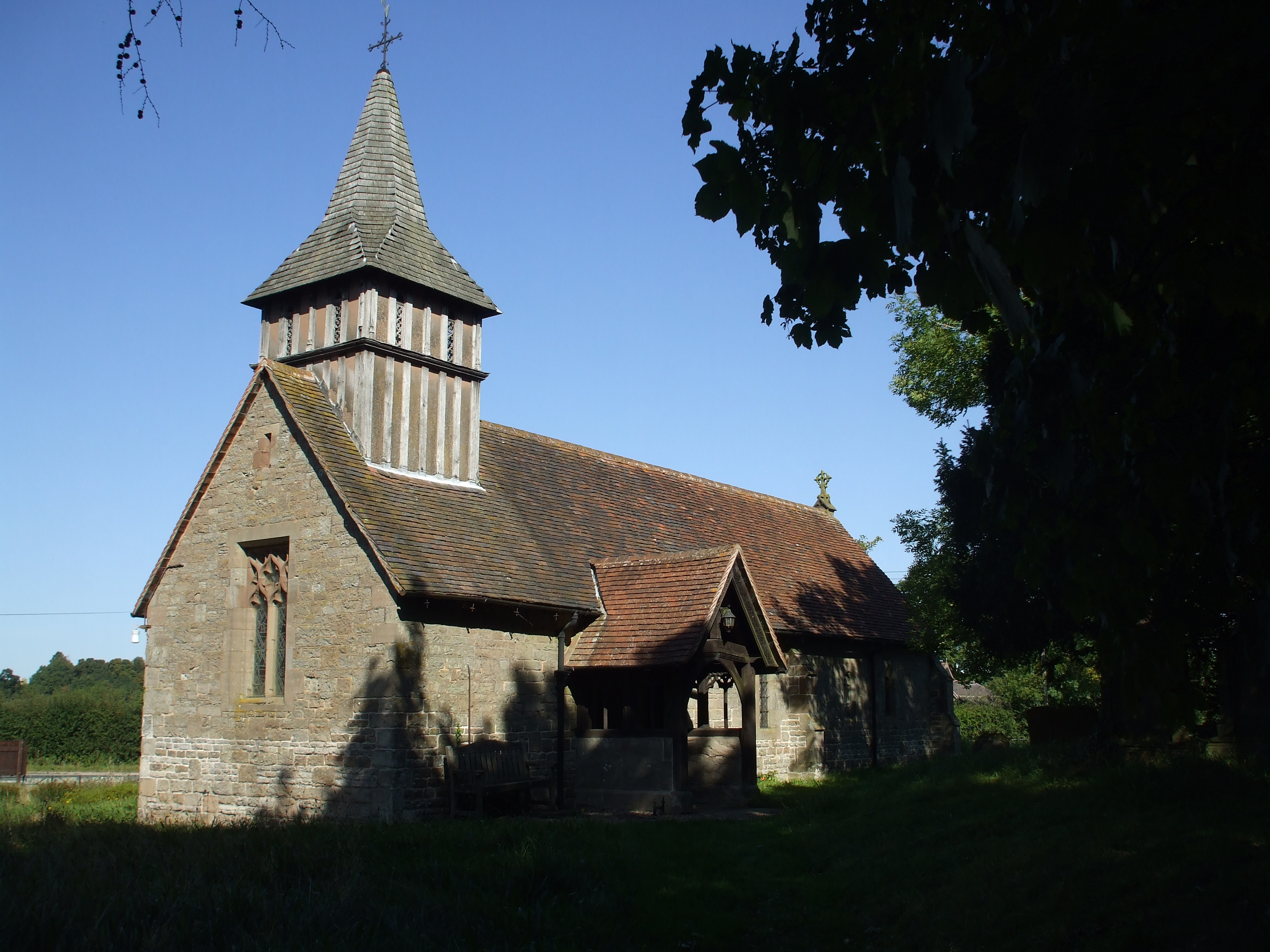
- St Marys Church

- Location within Warwickshire
- Population: 153 (2001 Census)
- OS grid reference: SP1265
- District: Stratford on Avon
- Shire county: Warwickshire
- Region: West Midlands
- Country: England
- Sovereign state: United Kingdom
- Post town: Henley-in-Arden
- Postcode district: B95
- Police: Warwickshire
- Fire: Warwickshire
- Ambulance: West Midlands
- UK Parliament: Stratford-on-Avon

Oldberrow is a village in the Stratford-on-Avon District of Warwickshire, England. The parish was part of Worcestershire until 1896, when it was transferred to Warwickshire, into which county it penetrated, between Morton Bagot and Ullenhall, as a narrow strip some 3 miles (4.8 km) long by about ½ mile wide. It is now part of the parish of Morton Bagot, Oldberrow and Spernall which in the 2001 Census had a population of 153. The land slopes from 513 ft (156 m) at Oldberrow Hill in the north-west to about 275 ft (84 m) in the south-east. There is no village, but the church, rectory, and the Court lie at the crossing of four small roads.

== History ==
Its name first appears in 709 when Cenred of Mercia gave 12 acres (49,000 m^{2}) in Oldberrow to Bishop Egwin towards the endowment of his newly founded monastery at Evesham. The spelling at this time was Ulenbeorge meaning either "the hill of the owl" or "Ulla's hill". It has gone through many variations of spelling, Oleburgh in the Domesday Book, Ullebury in the 1332 Subsidy Roll, then Owlburough, Uleberga, Oldborough, Oldbarrow and Oldburrow. The hill is about 2 miles (3.2 km) from the church and was described by Treadway Nash as an ancient tumulus In 1086, it was still held by the church at Evesham and is recorded; In Fishborough Hundred... In Oleburgh (Oldberrow) are 12 acres (49,000 m^{2}) of land. 2 countrymen, pigmen. Woodland, 1 league. Value 5s.

== Governance ==
Oldberrow is part of the Sambourne ward of Stratford-on-Avon District Council and represented by Councillor Justin Kerridge, Conservative Party. Nationally it is part of Stratford-on-Avon, whose current MP following the 2010 general election is Nadhim Zahawi of the Conservatives. Prior to Brexit in 2020 it was part of the West Midlands electoral region of the European Parliament.

== Notable buildings ==
The church, dedicated to St Mary is a small building of stone rebuilt in 1875, with the cost of £1256 largely being borne by the then rector, the Reverend Samuel D'Oyley Peshall who was rector for 60 years and the third generation of his family to hold the post. Despite the rebuilding some earlier features remain, two 12th-century windows, a lancet window of the 13th century and the 14th-century south doorway, the one to the north is of the 15th century and is blocked up. In the chancel there is a 12th-century piscina and an aumbury whilst the font has an archaic bowl with octagonal panels sculptured with foliage designs.

The east window is to the memory of the Reverend Samuel D'Oyley Peshall rector between 1792 and 1859, contains a piece of old glass bearing the arms of Evesham Abbey whilst the west window is dedicated to Canon Warren who became rector in 1933. The small turret contains three bells one of which is of an ancient long waisted type which may be 13th century, the others are by John Martin of Worcester and dated 1674. The puritan "Survei of the Ministrie in Warwickshier" of 1586 has some harsh words for the then Rector; "Geoffrie Heath parson dumbe idle and popish a verie dissolute man of life, he married first another mans wife, got a maide with childe, married a third; a common alehouse haunter and useth in (cantation) to plaie after a sorte the reconciler amongest the simple; value xx markes by the yeare".

== Gallery ==
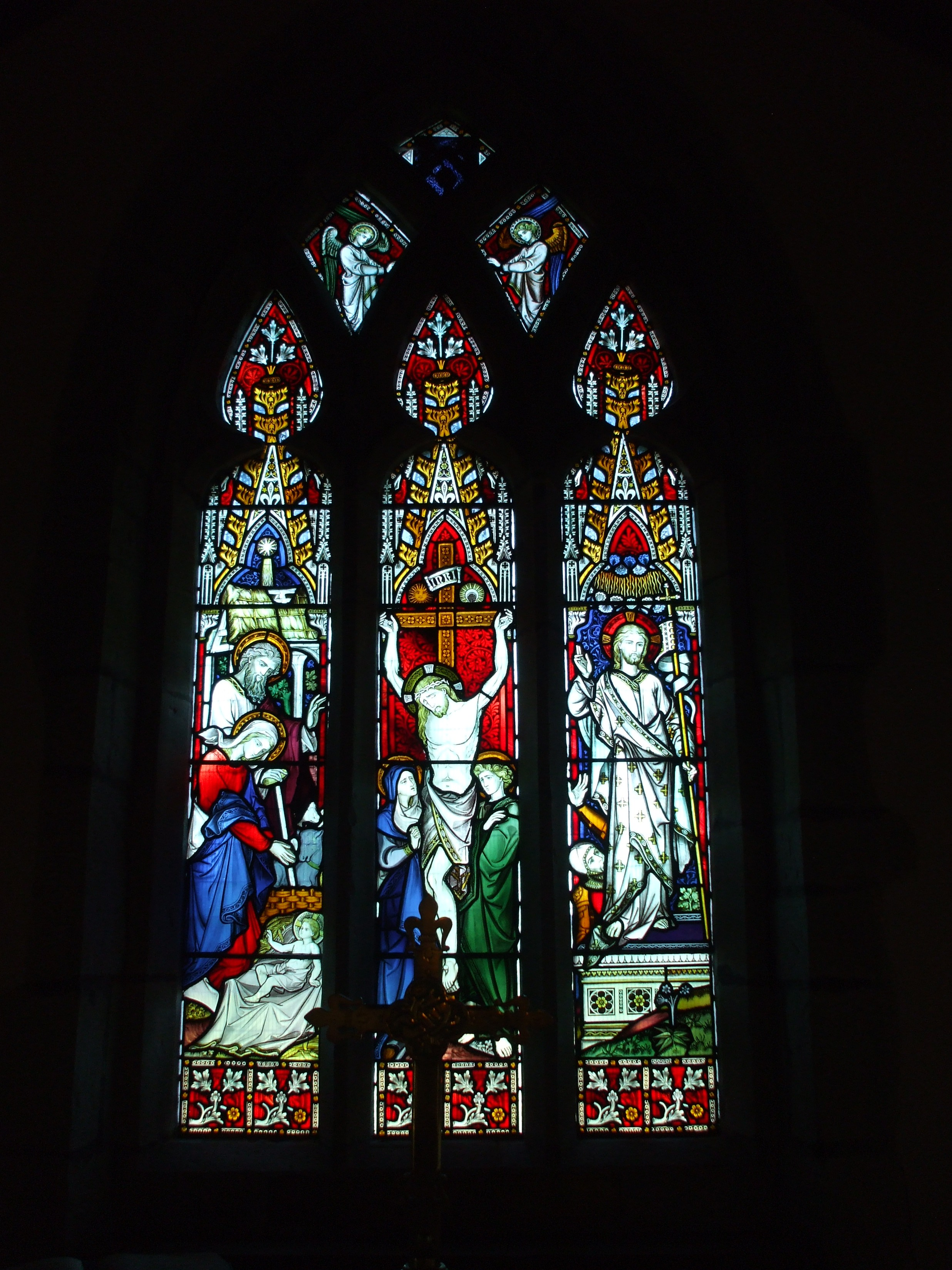
East Window of St Mary's

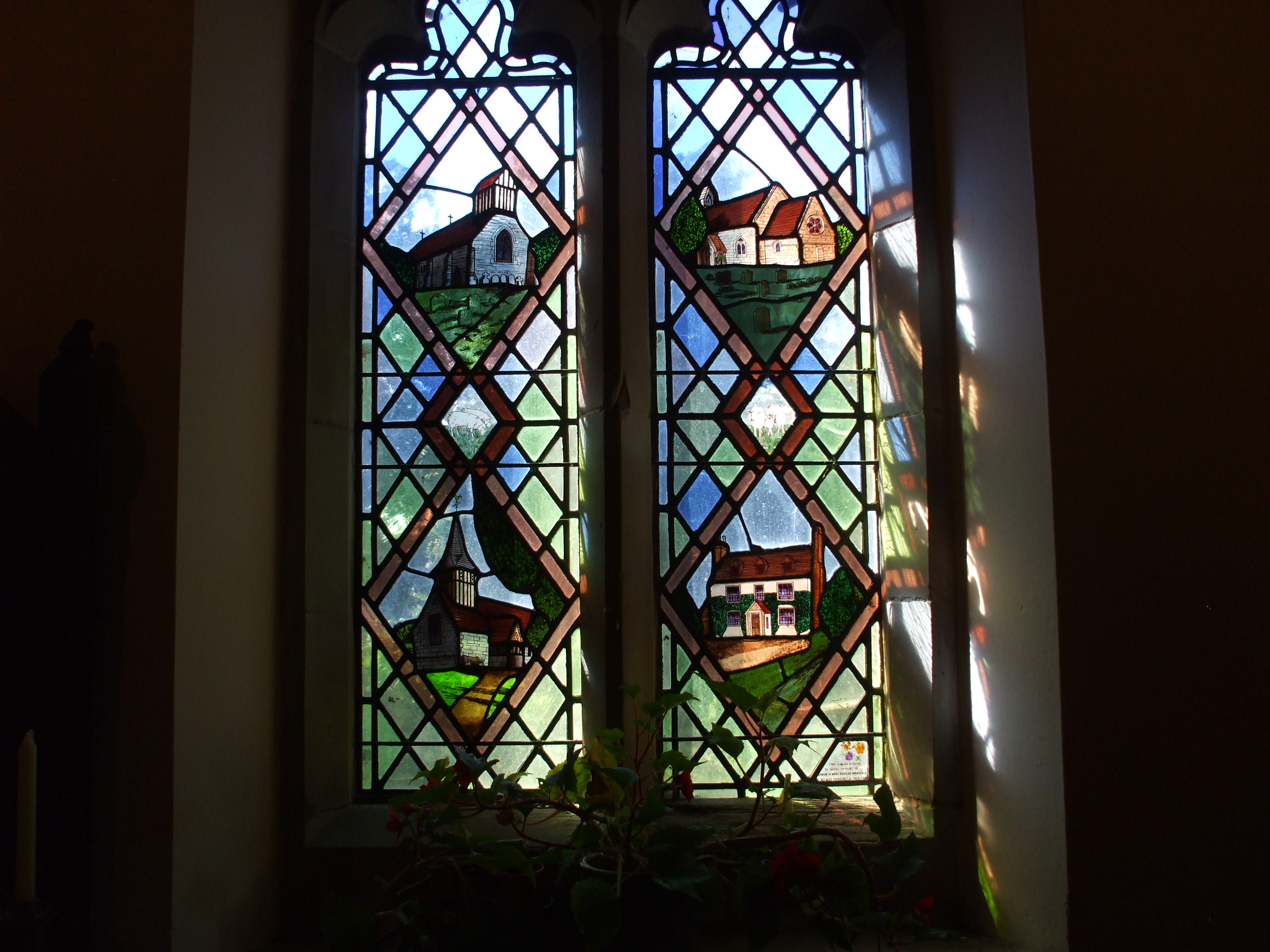
West window of St Mary's dedicated to Canon Warren

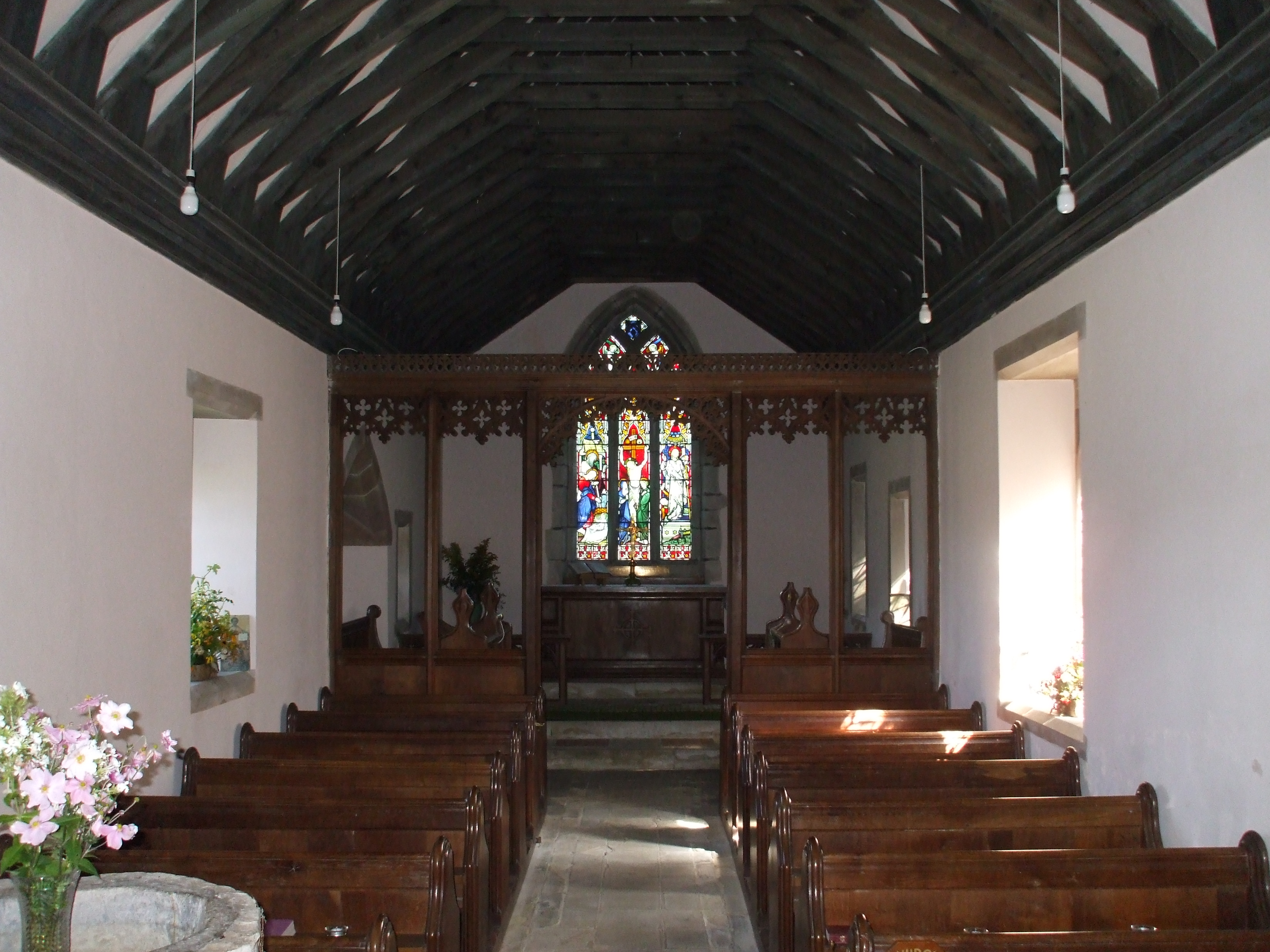
Interior of St Mary's church

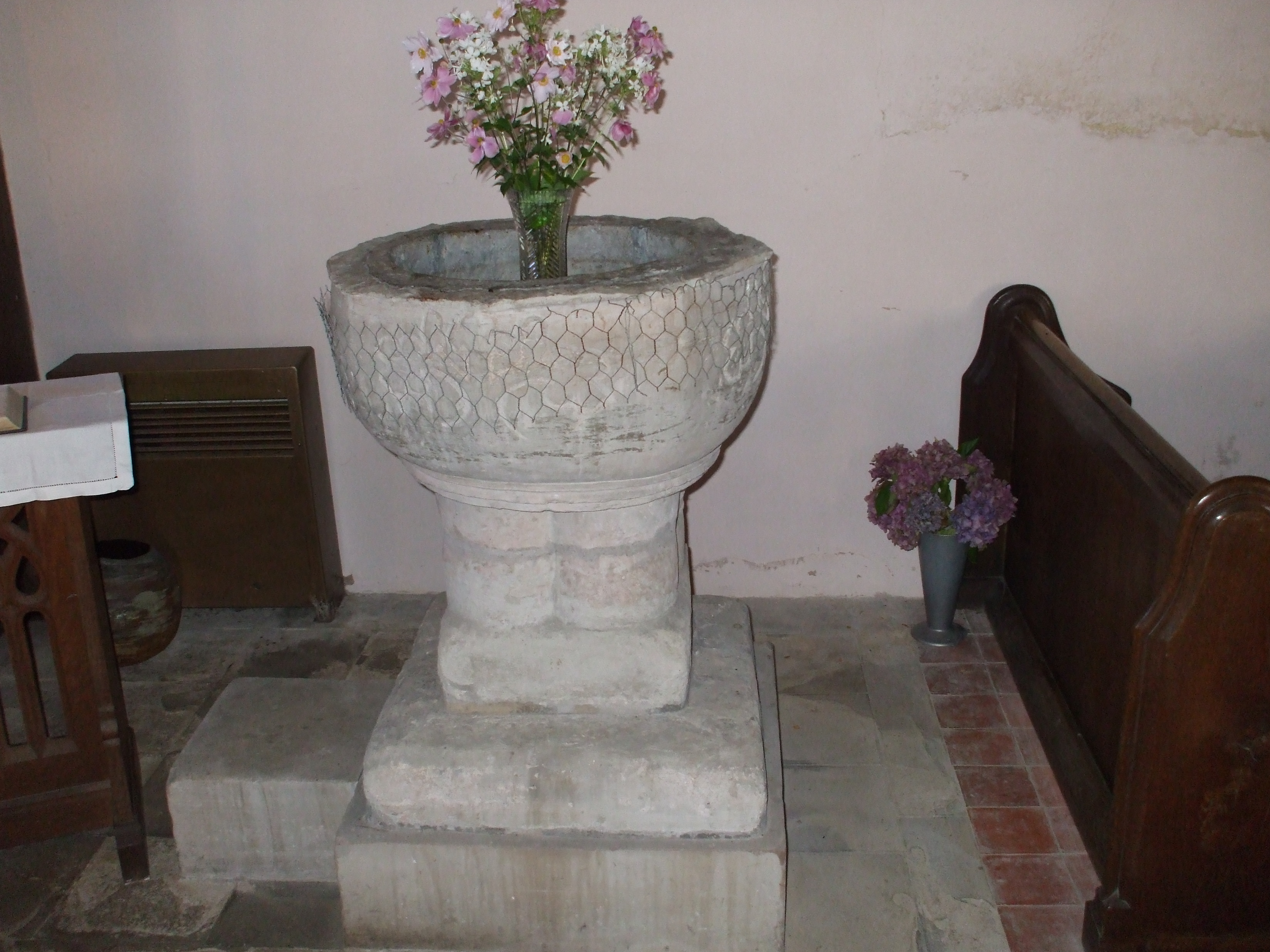
St Mary's church the font

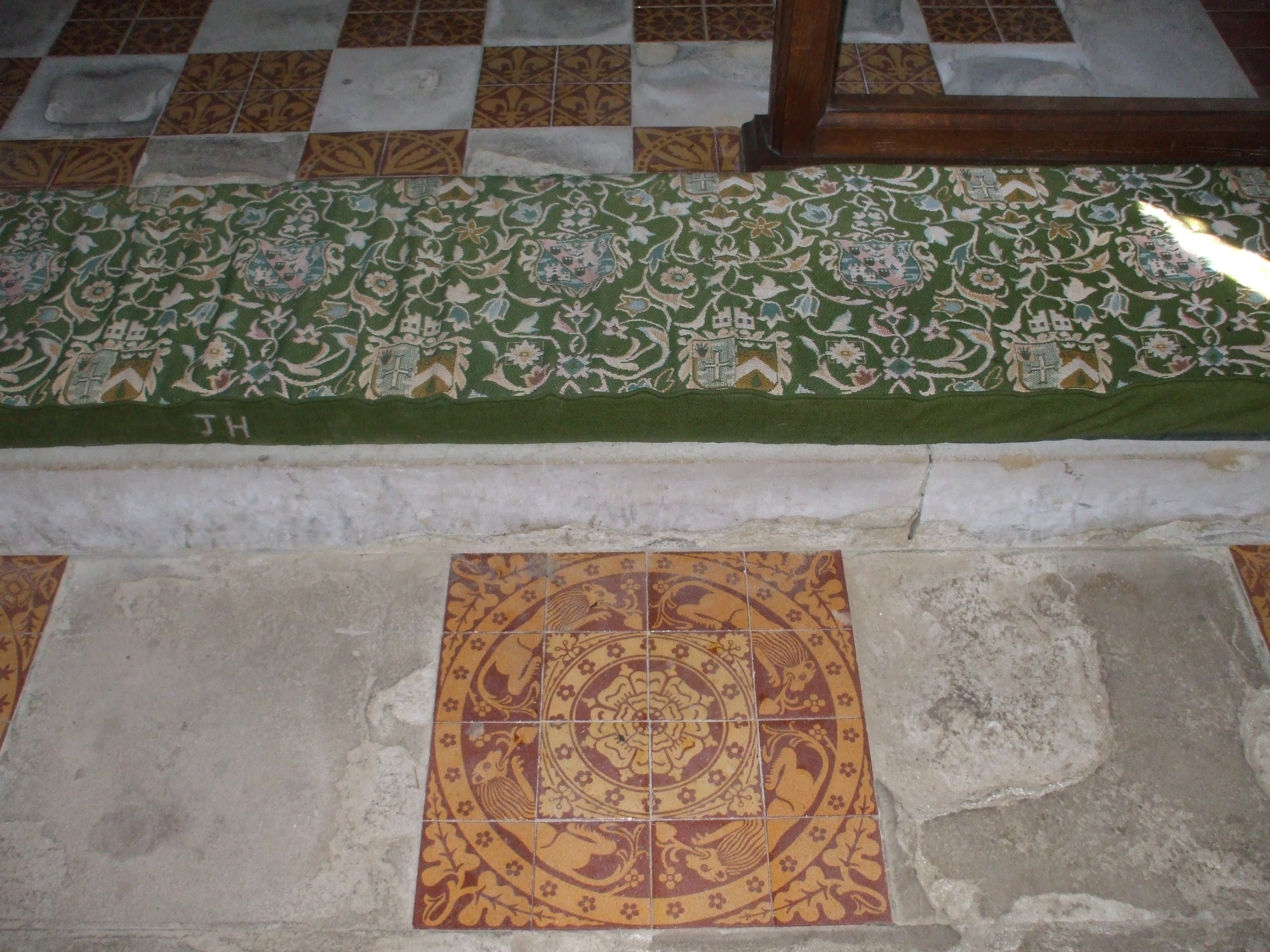
St Mary's church showing encaustic tiles in front of the Altar
