= Buckley Green =

Village in Warwickshire, England

Coordinates: 52.304°N 1.769°W

Buckley Green is a small village and village green situated 0.75 miles north of Henley-in-Arden, Warwickshire. Population details can be found under Beaudesert.
