= Forhill =

Hamlet in Worcestershire, UK

Coordinates: 52.3789°N 1.9247°W

Forhill (pronounced "forrull") is a hamlet in the Bromsgrove district, in the English county of Worcestershire, England.

The Roman Road Icknield Street passes through the hamlet. It is near Junction 2 of the M42 motorway.
