= St Peter's Catholic School, Solihull =

St Peter's Catholic School

Location
- Whitefields Road; Solihull, West Midlands, B91 3NZ; England
- 52.4058°N 1.7885°W

Information
- Other names: St Peter's RC Secondary School, St Peter's Catholic School and Specialist Science College
- Type: Academy
- Motto: "Faith is Our Foundation"
- Religious affiliation: Roman Catholic
- Established: 1974
- Department for Education URN: 148094 Tables
- Ofsted: Reports
- Head teacher: Stuart Shelton
- Staff: 150+
- Gender: Coeducational
- Colours: Red, Yellow, and Blue
- Website: www.st-peters.solihull.sch.uk

St Peter's Catholic School is a coeducational secondary school in the Blossomfield district of Solihull, West Midlands, England. The school has approximately 1,300 pupils with 200 pupils in the Sixth form. As a faith school, pupils are mainly drawn from Catholic schools in Solihull. The school in its present form was created in 1974 following a merger between Olton Court Convent School (founded in 1903) and Bishop Glancey High school. The Sixth Form was added in 1994.

Previously a voluntary aided school administered by Solihull Metropolitan Borough Council, in April 2021 St Peter's Catholic School converted to academy status. The school is now sponsored by the Our Lady and All Saints Catholic Multi Academy Company.

== Notable former pupils ==
- Karen Carney (b. 1987) – footballer, Arsenal W.F.C., sports journalist
- Dan Evans (b. 1990) – tennis player
- Callum Reilly (b. 1993) – footballer, Tamworth F.C.
- Jack Grealish (b. 1995) – footballer. Manchester City F.C.
- Aoife Mannion (b. 1995) – footballer, Newcastle United W.F.C.
- Iain Duncan Smith (b. 1954) - former Leader of the Conservative Party (UK) and Leader of the Opposition (UK)
