= Wiggins Hill =

Village in West Midlands, England

Coordinates: 52.535°N 1.755°W

- Hamlet
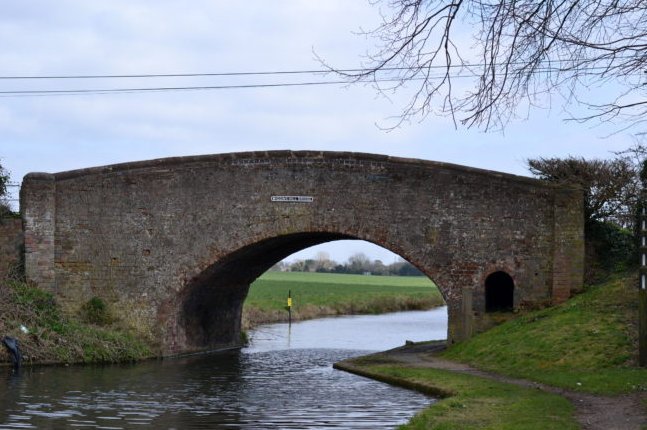
- OS grid reference: SP167931
- Metropolitan borough: Birmingham
- Metropolitan county: West Midlands
- Region: West Midlands
- Country: England
- Sovereign state: United Kingdom
- Post town: SUTTON COLDFIELD
- Postcode district: B76
- Dialling code: 0121
- Police: West Midlands
- Fire: West Midlands
- Ambulance: West Midlands
- UK Parliament: Sutton Coldfield

Wiggins Hill (sometimes spelled Wigginshill) is a hamlet situated in the Minworth area of the civil parish of Sutton Coldfield, West Midlands. It lies within the City of Birmingham on its northeastern outer fringe, where it forms part of the Sutton Walmley and Minworth electoral ward and borders the North Warwickshire district.

It is about halfway between Minworth and Curdworth, and was first documented in the Domesday Book as one of Turchill de Arden's manors. It was spelt then as 'Winchicelle', which meant 'The hill of Wicga's People'. It also had a seal of antiquity in Magna Carta, and during that time was known as Wincelle.

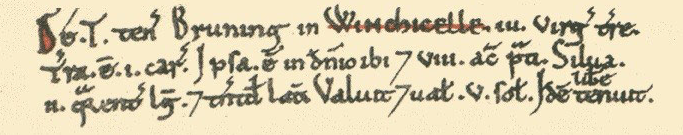
Wiggins Hill in the Domesday book

In the fields nearby, Roman coins of the third and fourth centuries have been found, also earthwork features of medieval times.

The main buildings in Wiggins Hill date to the 17th century. There is a half-timbered cottage with a large barn and a farmhouse with a Dutch gable. Wiggins Hill was a major meeting place for Quakers, with a meeting house and cottage being built there in 1724 by the group. Construction cost £100, of which £40 was raised by collections in the county. However, by the 19th century, the number of those attending was low resulting in the closure of the meeting house, which eventually fell into dilapidation.

Wiggins Hill did consist of a 15th-century timber-framed house named Wincelle (the name of the hamlet in Magna Carta); however, in 1910, it was dismantled and reassembled at its current site overlooking New Hall Valley Country Park, in New Hall Valley on the Wylde Green Road in Walmley, Sutton Coldfield.

The nearby Birmingham and Fazeley Canal was built in 1789 and brought passing trade.
