= Sambourne =

Village and civil parish in Warwickshire, England

Coordinates: 52.25907°N 1.91465°W

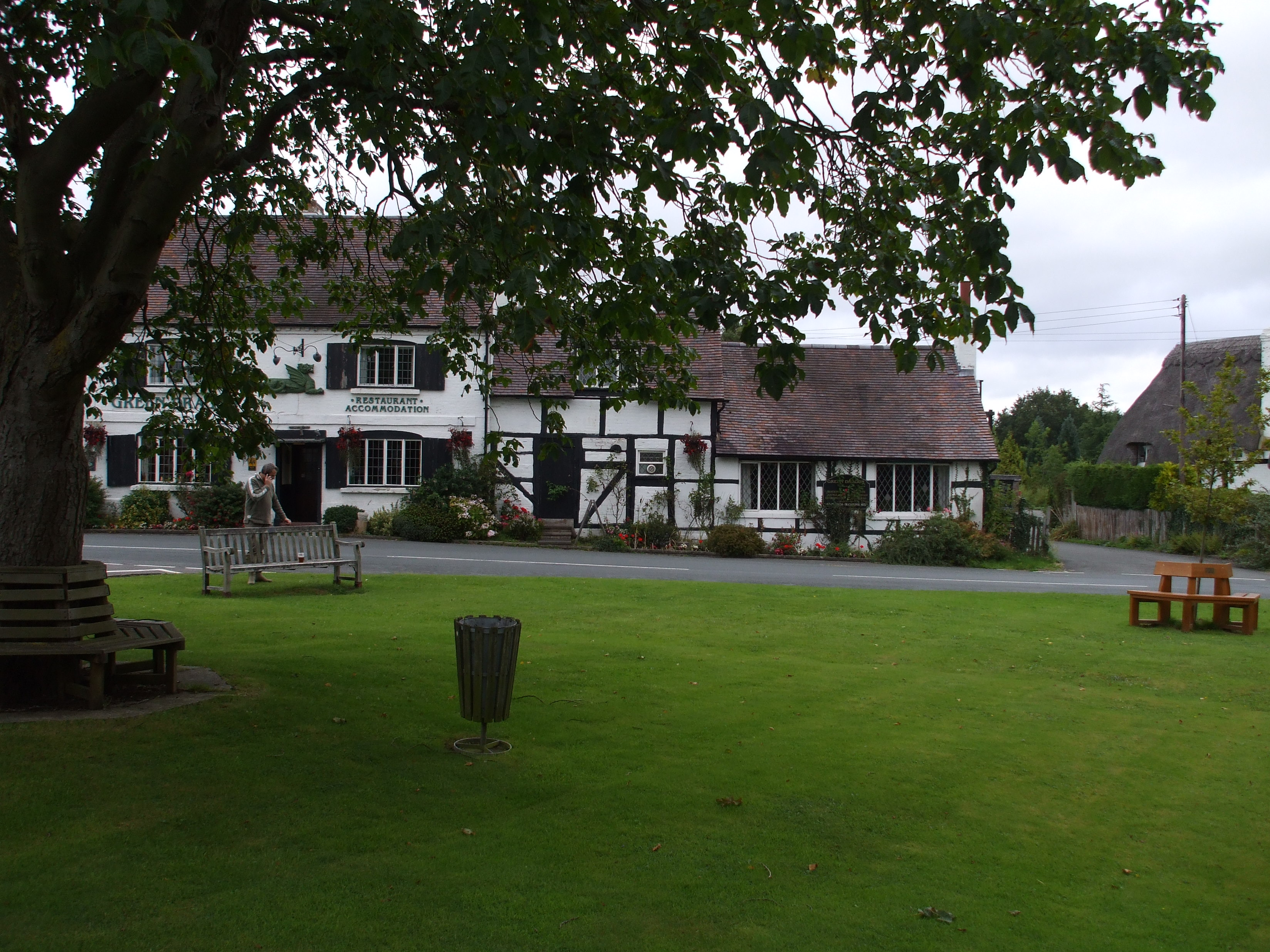
- Sambourne Village Green

- Location within Warwickshire
- Population: 1,805 (2001 Census)
- OS grid reference: SP059623
  - London: 120 miles (192 km) SE
- Civil parish: Sambourne
- District: Stratford-on-Avon
- Shire county: Warwickshire
- Region: West Midlands
- Country: England
- Sovereign state: United Kingdom
- Post town: REDDITCH
- Postcode district: B96
- Dialling code: 01527
- Police: Warwickshire
- Fire: Warwickshire
- Ambulance: West Midlands
- UK Parliament: Stratford-on-Avon

Sambourne, formerly spelled Sambourn, is a village and civil parish 1.5 miles (2.4 km) north-west of Coughton, 4.5 miles (7.2 km) south of Redditch, 12 miles (19 km) north-west of Stratford-upon-Avon and 20 miles (32 km) west of Warwick in the county of Warwickshire, England. It is situated on sloping ground rising westwards to about 500 feet near the ancient Ridge Way, and forms part of the county boundary with Worcestershire. The village itself is centred round a small triangular green at the junction of four roads and contains several timber-framed buildings of 17th century date. By a designation of 22 July 1991 much of the central area became a conservation area.

== History ==
The earliest reference to Sambourne is of 714 when it is recorded as being given by Egwin Bishop of Worcester to the monastery at Evesham Abbey upon its foundation. William Dugdale quotes the conventional date for the Abbey's foundation. This holding is confirmed by the Domesday Book which records, Land of Evesham Church, "The church itself holds in Sambourne 3 hides. Land for 4 ploughs. In lordship 1;2 slaves; 2 villagers and 4 smallholders with 3 ploughs. Woodland 1 league long and ½ league wide. The value was 20s now 30s." The medieval history of the village is bound up with that of the Royal Forest of Feckenham, where the abbots of Evesham at one time enclosed a considerable amount of the King's hunting forest without permission.

The whole village was taken into Feckenham Forest by King John, but the lord of the manor, the Abbot of Evesham, and his tenants assarted and inclosed a considerable area of the forest from time to time, with or without leave. The abbey claimed royal charters making it quit of waste, regardless of the view of foresters, verderers or the king's servants. In 1280, however, the abbot had to pay 50 marks to recover his wood of Sambourne which had been seized due to the disputes between his bailiffs and the Crown. Upon the Dissolution of the Monasteries it passed from the Crown to the Throckmortons of Coughton.

== Economy ==
Whilst the Domesday Book makes no mention of a mill a century later it is recorded that the mill of Sambourne was let out. In 1433 the Abbot of Evesham demised to John Throckmorton land in Sambourne, which was later confirmed upon John's son, Robert Throckmorton. It included the river and fishing from Spernall to Coughton and mills and fisheries are later enumerated in the demise of the manor to Robert Throckmorton in 1538. In the seventeenth century Sambourn was one of the earliest centres of the local needle-making industry. Edward Cooke (1798–1873), a needle manufacturer who lived and died at Sambourn, had for a wife, Hannah née Turberville (1799–1873). The area is now largely agricultural with many residents commuting to nearby cities for employment.

== Governance ==
Sambourne is part of Stratford-on-Avon District Council and represented by Councillor Neil Edden (Liberal Democrats). Nationally it is part of Stratford-on-Avon, parliamentary constituency whose current MP is Manuela Perteghella of the Liberal Democrats. Prior to Brexit in 2020 it was part of the West Midlands electoral region of the European Parliament.

== Notable landmarks ==
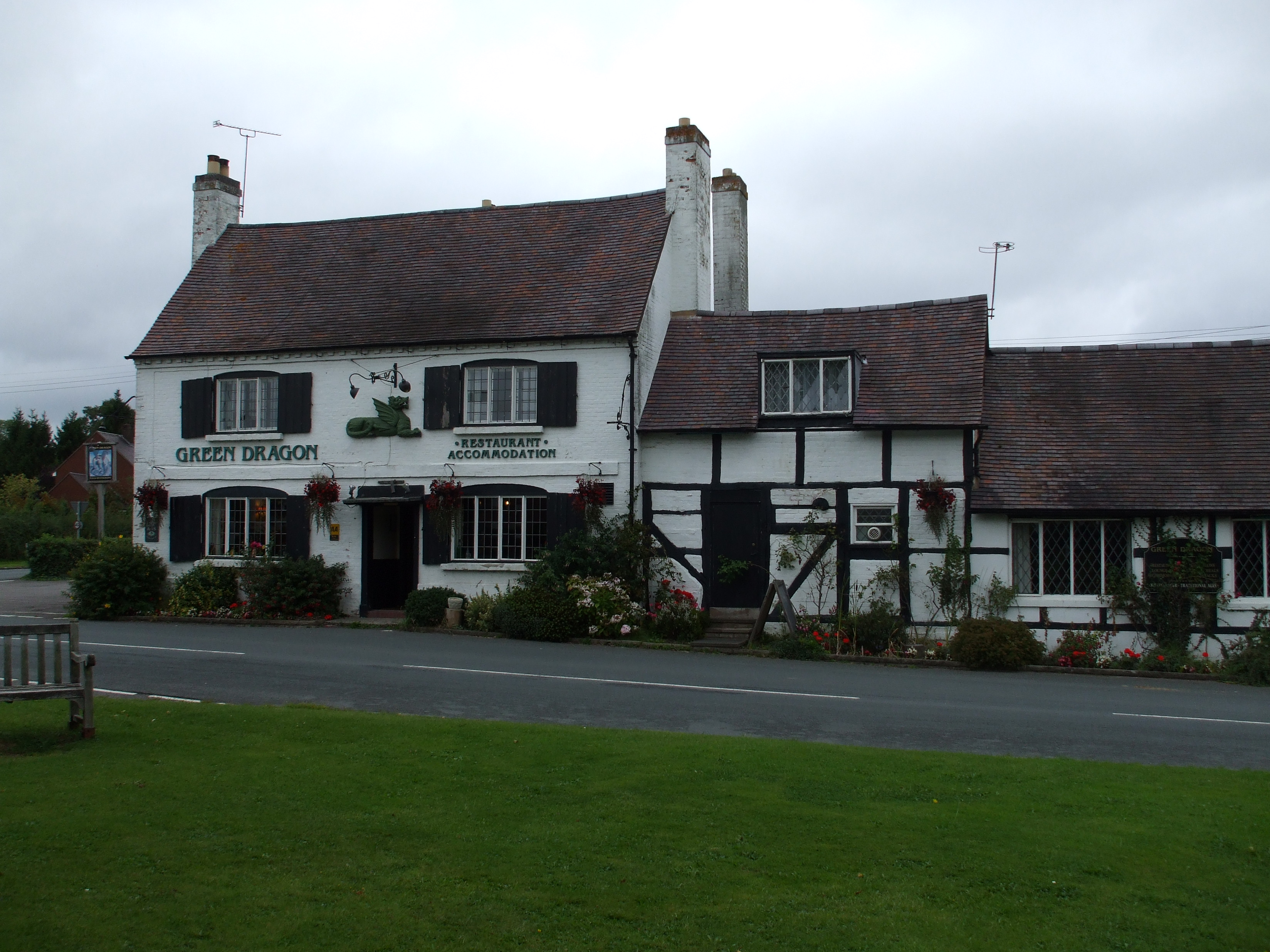
The Green Dragon Public House

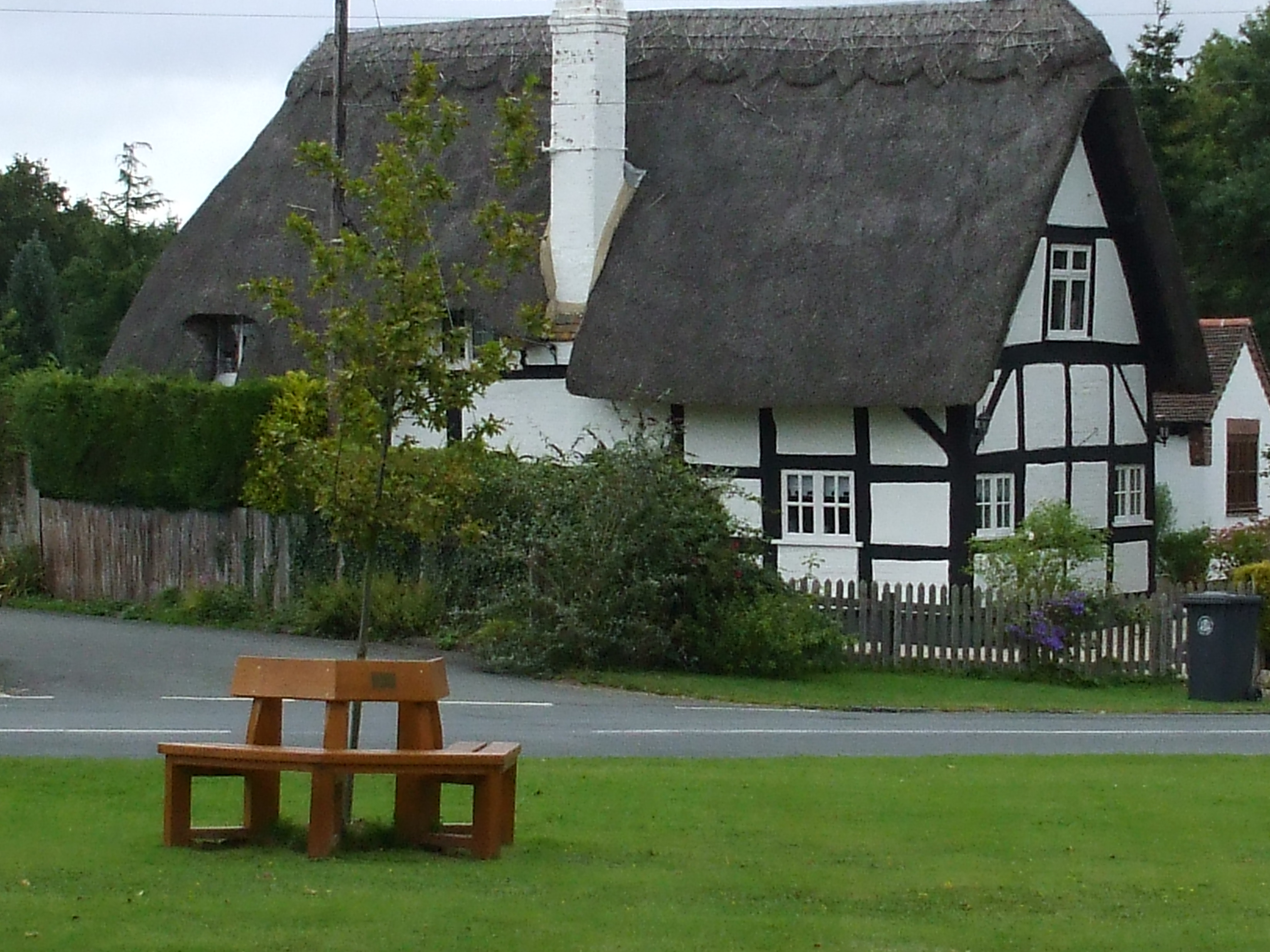
16th century cottage

The village has a small Chapel of Ease built in 1892 of brick and red tiles with a small tower and a bow fronted apse containing three lancet windows. The Green Dragon Inn, a modern brick public house, has a lower east extension of 17th-century timber-framing, and a tiled roof. The comedian, Tony Hancock's mother was licensee of the premises from 1941 to 1946, there is a plaque behind the bar commemorating the fact. A thatched cottage, east of it also has framing, of around 1600. The village green contains a war memorial to the men of the parish who fell in the First World War. The names include Lt Col Richard Courtenay Brabazon Throckmorton, nephew of Sir William Throckmorton, Baronet, of Coughton Court, Warwickshire; husband of[Lilian Throckmorton. He had served upwards of 21 years with 23rd Royal Welch Fusiliers and was killed in action in 1916 whilst commanding 5th Battalion Wiltshire Regiment in Mesopotamia. He is commemorated on the Basra memorial.

== Transport ==
The nearest railway station is now Redditch since Coughton station closed in 1952 and the line in 1962 following the Beeching report. Sambourne is 2 miles from the A435, the Roman road Ryknild Street with links into the major routes of A46 and the M42. The 512 bus stops in the village by previous telephone request on Mondays connecting to Stratford-upon-Avon and Redditch.

== Gallery ==
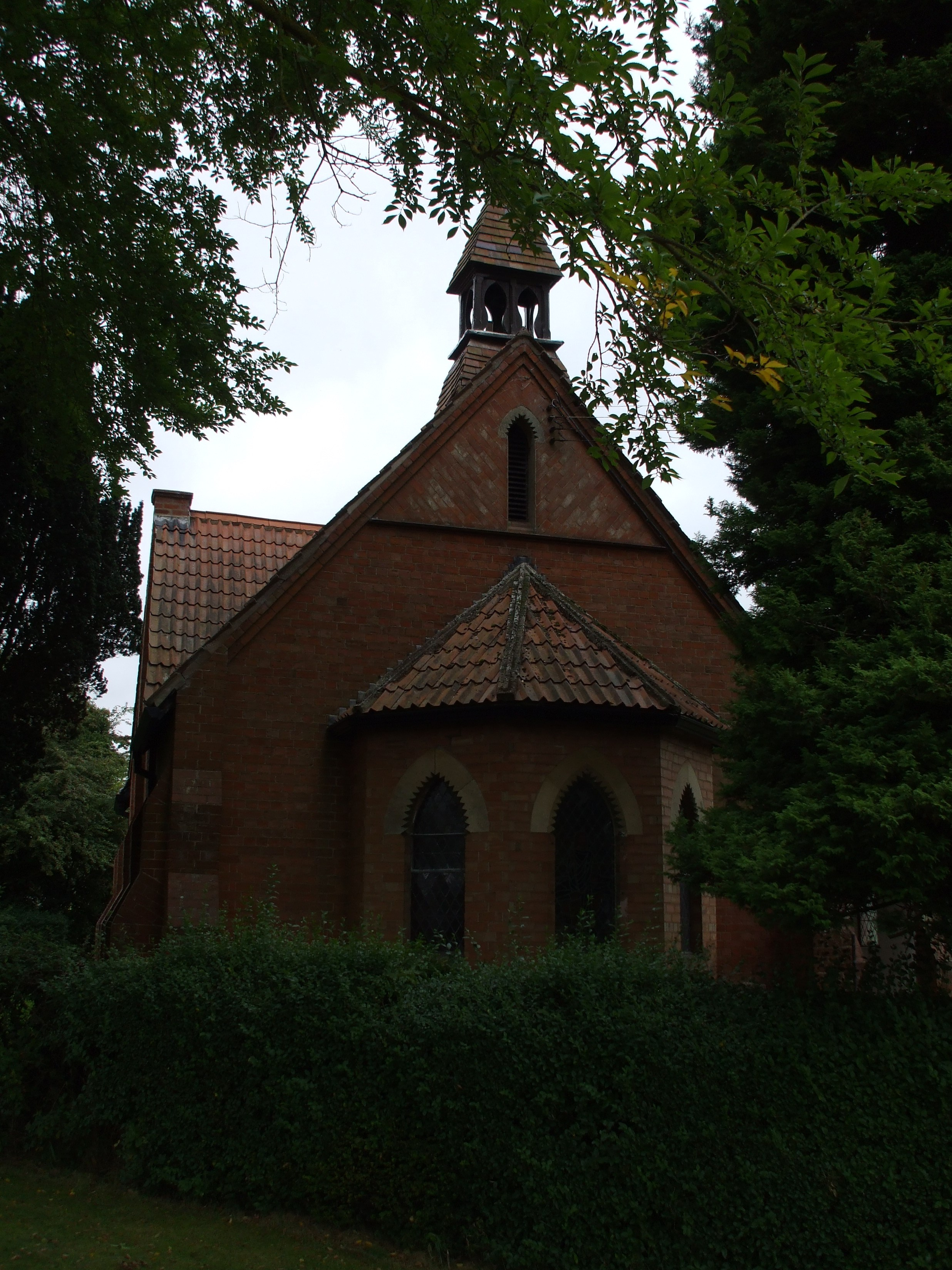
Chapel of Ease

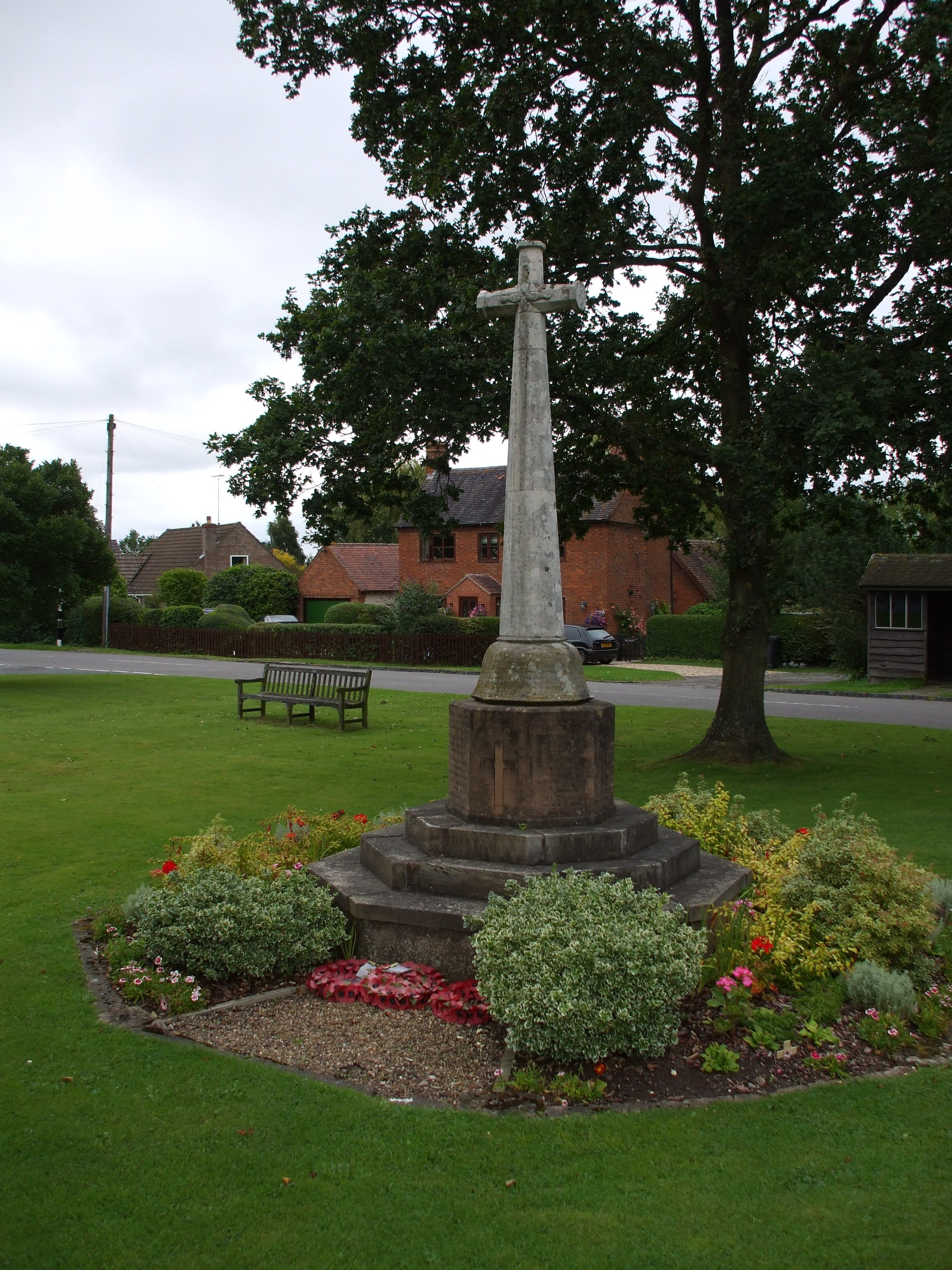
The war memorial
