= Tower Hill, West Midlands =

Area of Birmingham, England

Coordinates: 52.5336°N 1.9198°W

Tower Hill is an area of Great Barr, Birmingham, England. It is situated on the western side of the main A34 road that links Birmingham with Walsall, and straddles the Tame Valley Canal.

The canal passes through Tower Hill in a deep cutting in 200-million-year-old sandstone, and is crossed by Freeth Bridge (now restricted to pedestrians and bikes only). There are no locks on this section, which is at the Walsall Level.

The area was chiefly developed between 1930 and 1960 for a mix of private and council housing. It has shops, a medical centre, a library (venue for the Barr and Aston Local History Society) and an ambulance station; the latter in a former branch of the Birmingham Municipal Bank. The only pub, The Towers, boasts a sign carved by William Bloye.
