= Studley, Warwickshire =

Village and civil parish in Warwickshire, England

Coordinates: 52.26961°N 1.89151°W

Studley
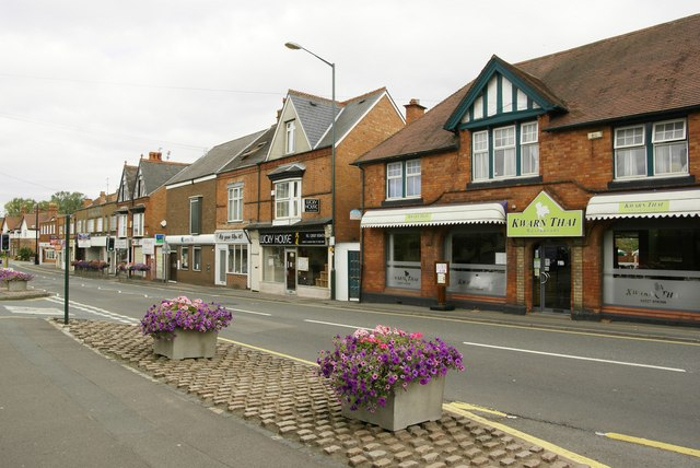
- Central Studley

- Location within Warwickshire
- Population: 6,040 (2021)
- OS grid reference: SP075635
- Civil parish: Studley
- District: Stratford-on-Avon
- Shire county: Warwickshire
- Region: West Midlands
- Country: England
- Sovereign state: United Kingdom
- Post town: STUDLEY
- Postcode district: B80
- Dialling code: 01527
- Police: Warwickshire
- Fire: Warwickshire
- Ambulance: West Midlands
- UK Parliament: Stratford-on-Avon

Studley is a large village and civil parish in the Stratford-on-Avon district of Warwickshire, England. Situated on the western edge of Warwickshire near the border with Worcestershire, it is 3.5 miles (6 km) southeast of Redditch and 13 miles (21 km) northwest of Stratford-upon-Avon. The Roman road of Ryknild Street, now the A435, passes through the village on its eastern edge, parallel to the River Arrow. The name derives from the Old English leah, being a meadow or pasture, where horses, stod, are kept.

The United Kingdom Census 2021 reported Studley's population as being 6,040.

== History ==
The manor of Studley is recorded twice in the Domesday Book mostly as part of the lands of William son of Courbucion; who was appointed Sheriff of Warwick soon after 1086; where it reads:

"In Ferncombe Hundred in Stodlei (Studley) 4 hides. Land for 11 ploughs. In lordship 2; 3 slaves. 19 villagers with a priest and 12 smallholders have 9 ploughs. A mill at 5s; meadow, 24 acres; a salt house which pays 19 packloads of salt; woodland 1 league long and ½ a league wide. The value was and is 100s. Swein held it freely."

A further holding is listed as part of the land of William Bonavallet:

"William holds 1 hide in Stodlei from William. Land for 2 ploughs. In lordship 1 plough. Meadow 4 acres; woodland 3 furlongs long and 2 furlongs wide. Value 10s. Godric held it freely."

In the medieval period it was the site of a castle, the old castle was located just north of what is now St Mary's Church, and was possibly built around 1135-40, all that remains now is a circular rampart and ditch. This castle is unrelated to the nearby 19th-century house called Studley Castle. There is also the remains of Studley Priory: The Augustinian priory was founded in the 12th century by Peter Corbizun but was closed at the dissolution under Henry VIII and was used as a source of stone for other local buildings. Nothing remains today apart from the use of the name priory in a few local building names such as Priory Farm, which now much modernised, embodies a few fragmentary portions of a conventual building. A gabled west wall of stone rubble contains the remains of a large 14th-century window. A few medieval sculptured fragments are built on to the walls.

Like neighbouring Reddich, Studley's growth rested on the manufacture of needles and fishing tackle, and industry which was first recorded in 1695. In 1800 James Pardow applied steam power to needle making, and opened a factory on Mill Road.

The Studley Inclosure Act 1817 (57 Geo. 3. c. 43 Pr.) inclosed land in the parish.

== Economy ==
Studley is also known for being the site of a sewing needle and surgical needle making industry. This specialisation started when Elizabeth I permitted a number of Huguenot refugees to settle here, bringing this rare craft with them.

From the 19th century, precision-made surgical needles were in demand, and, with advances in manufacturing technology, such was the demand that over 3,000 workers were employed. In 1977 the old factory where needles were made was burnt down, and the production of "Aero" needles moved to a nearby site. The original factory site now contains a supermarket, other retail outlets, and housing. One of the streets in the village is named "Crooks Lane", ostensibly because the crooked needles from the original factory were dumped at the end of this lane, but the road was there before the village had a needle factory.

== Governance ==
Studley has three levels of local governance:

- Studley Parish Council currently comprises 11 councillors.
- Studley North and Studley South are wards on Stratford-on-Avon District Council, and are represented by Liberal Democrat Councillors Peter Hencher-Serafin and Neil Edden, respectively.
- Studley is a division on Warwickshire County Council, and is represented by Restore Britain Councillor Luke Cooper.

Nationally it is part of Stratford-on-Avon constituency, whose current Member of Parliament is Manuela Perteghella of the Liberal Democrats. Before Brexit in 2020, it was included in the West Midlands electoral region of the European Parliament.

== Geography ==
Studley is surrounded on the north, east and west by hills rising to about 500 ft. The River Arrow flows across the south-west corner, through flat ground, but the country north and east of the brook is for the most part undulating and well wooded. The main village lies on the west bank of the river, along the Roman Ryknild Street, which is now the A435, Alcester Road. The fact that the church and the site of the castle are about half a mile away on the opposite side of the river indicates that the original settlement was, at some distance from the Roman Road. At Washford, half a mile north of Studley village, the main road bears right from the Ryknild Street and continues through the village of Mappleborough Green and up Gorcott Hill. The Ryknild Street (which between Washford and Ipsley diverges considerably from its original line) was, until the end of the 18th century, the main road to Birmingham; the present road between Spernall Ash (on the southern boundary of Studley parish) and Digbeth in Birmingham was turnpiked by an act of Parliament of 1721.

== Notable buildings ==
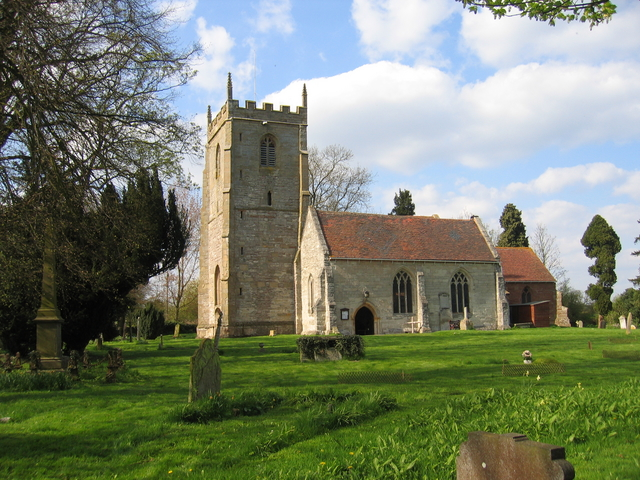
Church of the Nativity of the Blessed Virgin Mary, Studley, Warwickshire

The parish church of the Nativity of the Blessed Virgin consists of a chancel, nave, south aisle and west tower. It features a 12th-century north wall and window of Norman date, fine surviving examples of opus spicatum or herringbone masonry, a medieval rood screen, Elizabethan era table and dug out chest, Jacobean era pulpit and brasses and other points of interest.

The survey of the clergy by the puritans in 1586 described the then vicar, Thomas Penford as; "dumbe & vnlearned, a verie aged man, he can scarce reade, yet he hath learning enough for 2 benefices; for he reapeth the fruite of Studley & Coughton both, he hath of late gotten him a certaine hireling to serue his turne at both places, one Robt. Cathell a seelie Welshman that can scarce reade English distinctlie. The valew of both is better then xx by the yeare".

There is also St Mary's Church, a Roman Catholic church dating from 1853, designed by Charles Hansom, this is grade II listed.

== Education ==
Studley has 3 primary and one secondary school within the Warwickshire Local Education Authority (LEA) area.

School	Compulsory education stage	School website	Ofsted details
Studley Community Infants School	Primary	Studley Community Infants' School	Ofsted details for unique reference number 125527
Saint Mary's Roman Catholic Primary School	Primary	St Mary's Catholic Primary School	Ofsted details for unique reference number 125710
Saint Mary's Church of England Primary School	Primary	St Mary's C.E. Academy	Ofsted details for unique reference number 141000
Studley High School	Secondary	Studley High School	Ofsted details for unique reference number 136786

== Sports and leisure ==
Studley is often noted as having many pubs, 17 within one square mile.

As well as having a number of football teams, including Studley BKL and Studley Juniors, founded a few years ago by Kevin Sanders and Mike Imms, (formed when the Redditch United Youth Teams broke away and were taken on by Studley BKL), the village also gives its name to Studley Musical Theatre and Operatic group which has been going for over 100 years. They perform twice a year, once in April in a spring show, performing Oliver in 2010 and Fiddler on the Roof in April 2011 and a summer concert.

Just outside the village on the Birmingham road is Studley Cricket Club, home to a social and sports club, members of the Birmingham and District Premier League, (top of the regional midlands structure).

There is also a large mixed sports and social club in Eldorado Close (Studley Sports & Social Club, commonly known as the Entaco). This is home to a number of football teams across its 2 pitches, as well as being one of the bases of Redditch Entaco Cricket Club. The club also has a number of tennis courts and a bowling green.

== Transport ==
The A435 road passes through Studley as Alcester Road, which runs between Birmingham and Cirencester. The A448 road passes along the western side of the village. The other main roads in Studley are the B4092 Station Road/High Street and B4093 Redditch Road.

=== Railway ===
Between 1868 and 1962, Studley was served by Studley & Astwood Bank on the former Evesham Loop Line. The nearest railway station today is Redditch.

=== Buses ===
Studley is served mainly by the X19 bus route from Redditch to Stratford-upon-Avon, operated by Stagecoach Midlands; and the 247 bus route from Redditch to Evesham, operated by Diamond West Midlands. Other minor routes include the 500 and 502 school bus routes (both Diamond), and 512 bus route (Flexibus).

== Notable people ==
- Hannah Hampton, professional association footballer, grew up in the village.
- Andy Smith, a former Professional Darts Corporation lives in the village.
- Freddie Starr, comedian, had a home in Studley.
