= Little Bromwich =

Area of Birmingham, England

Coordinates: 52.481°N 1.840°W

Little Bromwich is a small area in central-east Birmingham, England. It borders with Bordesley Green and Small Heath and there is a road named after it. It is also quite close to Yardley, and often confused with part of Bordesley Green.

The Little Bromwich Centre is on Hob Moor Road. The area covered is from Hob Moor Road to Little Bromwich Road.

The area is part of the Birmingham Ladywood and Birmingham Yardley parliamentary constituencies, it is in the Bordesley Green and Heartlands council wards.

Following the 2021 United Kingdom census, it was reported in 2022 that Little Bromwich had the smallest share of adults identifying as gay, lesbian or bisexual in England and Wales.
