= Woodgate, Birmingham =

Area of Birmingham, England

Coordinates: 52.442°N 2.008°W

Woodgate
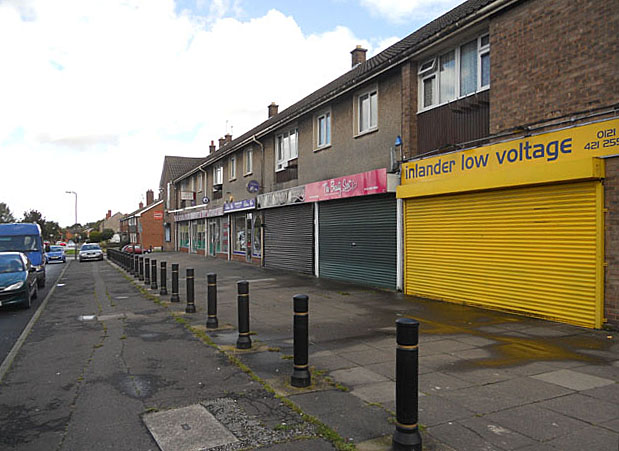
- Shops on Wood Lane

- Location within the West Midlands
- Metropolitan borough: Birmingham
- Metropolitan county: West Midlands
- Region: West Midlands
- Country: England
- Sovereign state: United Kingdom
- Post town: BIRMINGHAM
- Postcode district: B32
- Dialling code: 0121
- Police: West Midlands
- Fire: West Midlands
- Ambulance: West Midlands

Woodgate is an area of Birmingham, West Midlands, England, between Bartley Green and Harborne. It is split up into 3 parts, Woodgate Valley South (also known as South Woodgate), which is the gateway to Harborne. Woodgate, which is next to Bartley Green, and Woodgate Valley North, often referred as part of Quinton.

Revised plans disclosed by Birmingham Council's Public Works Committee in 1968 show new housing for 20,000 people (17,000 in council-built and 3,000 in private-built homes), double the original number put forward two years earlier. The plans also show a proposed Woodgate/Edgbaston Expressway road from the M5 junction 3 routed along the southern part of Woodgate Valley, and a boating lake north of Hillcrest School, Birmingham, known then as Bartley Green Grammar School. At a public meeting held at Four Dwellings School in April 1968 the chairman of the Public Works Committee explained the housing scheme was essential to help eradicate Birmingham's remaining slums. In February 1970 it was announced dwellings would be built on both sides of the valley. Provision for car parking was emphasised; each home having a car port or garage, and some having an integral garage with the living accommodation on top using the slope of the land. The number of homes was put at 4,600 with half now private. Following a public inquiry into the proposed expressway a new route north of the valley was mooted.

The first residents of Woodgate Valley South moved on to the housing estate in 1971.
