= Bishopgate Green =

Coordinates: 52.418276°N 1.503292°W

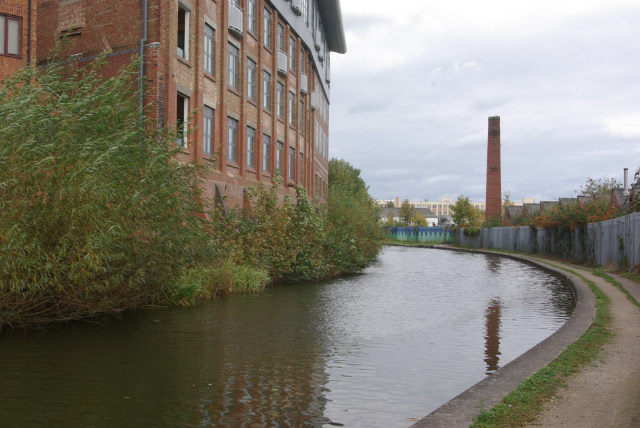
- The Coventry Canal in Bishopgate Green

- Location within the West Midlands
- OS grid reference: SP337802
- Metropolitan borough: Coventry
- Metropolitan county: West Midlands
- Region: West Midlands
- Country: England
- Sovereign state: United Kingdom
- Post town: COVENTRY
- Postcode district: CV1
- Dialling code: 024
- Police: West Midlands
- Fire: West Midlands
- Ambulance: West Midlands
- UK Parliament: Coventry East; Coventry North West

Bishopgate Green (also known as Bishopsgate Green) is a suburb of Coventry in the West Midlands, England. It is located on the Coventry Canal. It is an area between Foleshill and Hillfields and shares the area code CV1.
