= Cofton Common =

Area of Birmingham, England

Coordinates: 52.392°N 1.977°W

Cofton Common is a small area of Birmingham, England, located near Longbridge on the border with Worcestershire.
