= Gib Heath =

Coordinates: 52.500°N 1.924°W

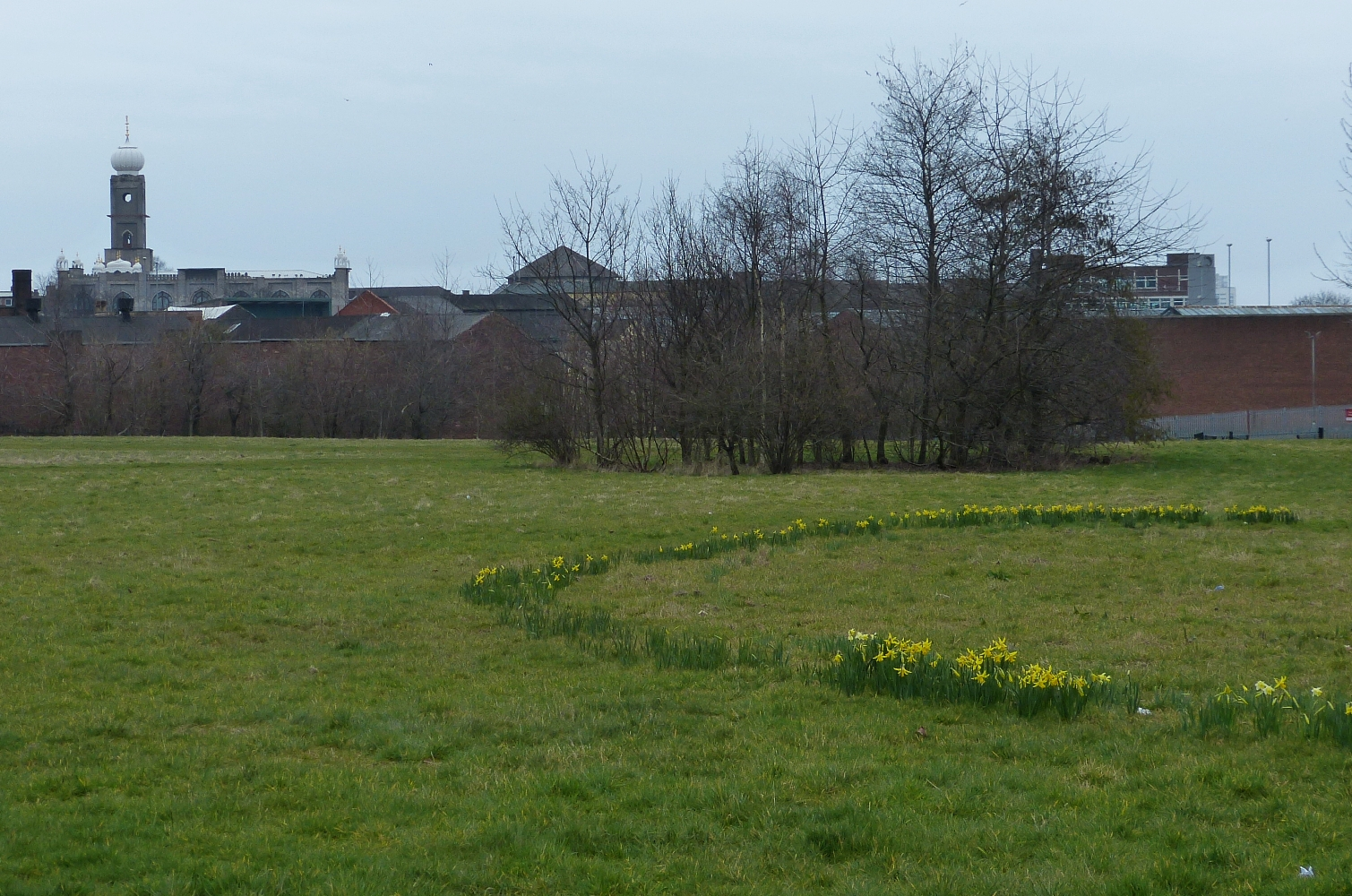
View across the parkland known as Gib Heath, towards the Babe Ke Gurdwara temple

Gib Heath (historically Gibb Heath or Gibheath) is a small area of Birmingham, England. It is an inner-city area generally considered to be a part of Handsworth.
