= Oakham, West Midlands =

Coordinates: 52.507°N 2.052°W

Oakham
- Location within the West Midlands
- OS grid reference: SO9689
- Metropolitan borough: Sandwell; Dudley
- Metropolitan county: West Midlands
- Region: West Midlands
- Country: England
- Sovereign state: United Kingdom
- Post town: DUDLEY
- Postcode district: DY2
- Dialling code: 01384
- Police: West Midlands
- Fire: West Midlands
- Ambulance: West Midlands
- UK Parliament: Halesowen; West Bromwich

Oakham is an area of Dudley, England, situated on the peak of Turners Hill, the highest point in the West Midlands county.

All of the area was historically in Dudley but in 1966 approximately half of it, including the Tividale Hall and Grace Mary housing estates, was incorporated into the county borough of Warley (centred on the former boroughs of Oldbury, Smethwick and Rowley Regis), which in turn merged with West Bromwich in 1974 to form Sandwell.

It was a largely rural area until the 1930s, when private and council housing developments took place around City Road, including the Grace Mary Estate (council housing). The Tividale Hall Estate was developed for private housing from the mid-1930s, but construction was halted due to the war effort around 1940. Both of these estates were expanded after the end of World War II in 1945, including the extension of Regent Road to link up with Oakham Road.

"Big Bertha", an anti-aircraft gun, was erected at the top of the hill near City Road when World War II broke out in 1939. Although this gun proved useful in eliminating enemy aircraft, it also became an enemy target.

The Oakham area fell victim to most of Dudley's air raids by the German Luftwaffe on 19 November 1940. These damaged several houses in City Road on the Grace Mary Estate and resulted in 10 civilian deaths as well as many injuries.

On 21 December 1940, a stray shell from the anti-aircraft gun fell down the chimney of the Boat Inn one mile away in Dudley Road East, Tividale, resulting in 13 deaths and dozens of injuries. On 12 August 1941, the Luftwaffe dropped a landmine several hundreds yards from the gun in Birch Crescent, demolishing a pair of new semi-detached houses and severely damaging several others, leaving four people dead and several others injured. The gun was dismantled after the war ended in 1945, but several traces of it remain more than 70 years later.

Oakham's most famous resident was George Smith, known as the Dudley Hangman. He was born in nearby Rowley Regis in 1805. In 1840 he became assistant to the executioner William Calcraft before being appointed as executioner for Staffordshire in his own right. He became notorious for entertaining customers in Black Country pubs with gruesome stories of his work. There was a pub in Oakham, now demolished, called the 'Hangman's Tree' which was named in George Smith's honour. It was demolished in 2007.

Oakham Primary School has served the Sandwell section of Oakham since 1939, and was originally known as City Road Infant and Junior Schools. It now has 420 places for pupils aged 5–11 as well as a nursery unit for a total of 60 children aged 3 or 4 years. Grace Mary Primary is another primary school in the area, having opened in April 1959.
