= Pelham, Birmingham =

Coordinates: 52.4881°N 1.8404°W

There is also a place called Pelham in Birmingham, Alabama

Pelham is a small "sub-area" of Alum Rock, Birmingham, England, that surrounds the former Pelham Arms pub (demolished in 2007), and is roughly at the point where Saltley and Ward End meet. There are a few local shops, and there used to be the Capitol Cinema, until it was closed down in 1996.

"Pelham" does not appear on any maps, nor is it officially recognised; the name is used locally to describe the area surrounding the former site of the Pelham Arms by attributing the name of the pub to the area. Other examples of this in Birmingham are "The Fox And Goose" in Ward End, "The Broadway" in Bordesley Green and "The Scott Arms" in Great Barr.
