= Whitehouse Common =

Coordinates: 52.569°N 1.798°W

Whitehouse Common is an area of Sutton Coldfield, Birmingham, England. It lies north of Falcon Lodge which is separated from it by a main road.

The area is served by Whitehouse Common Primary School.
