= Driffold =

Coordinates: 52.55589°N 1.82867°W

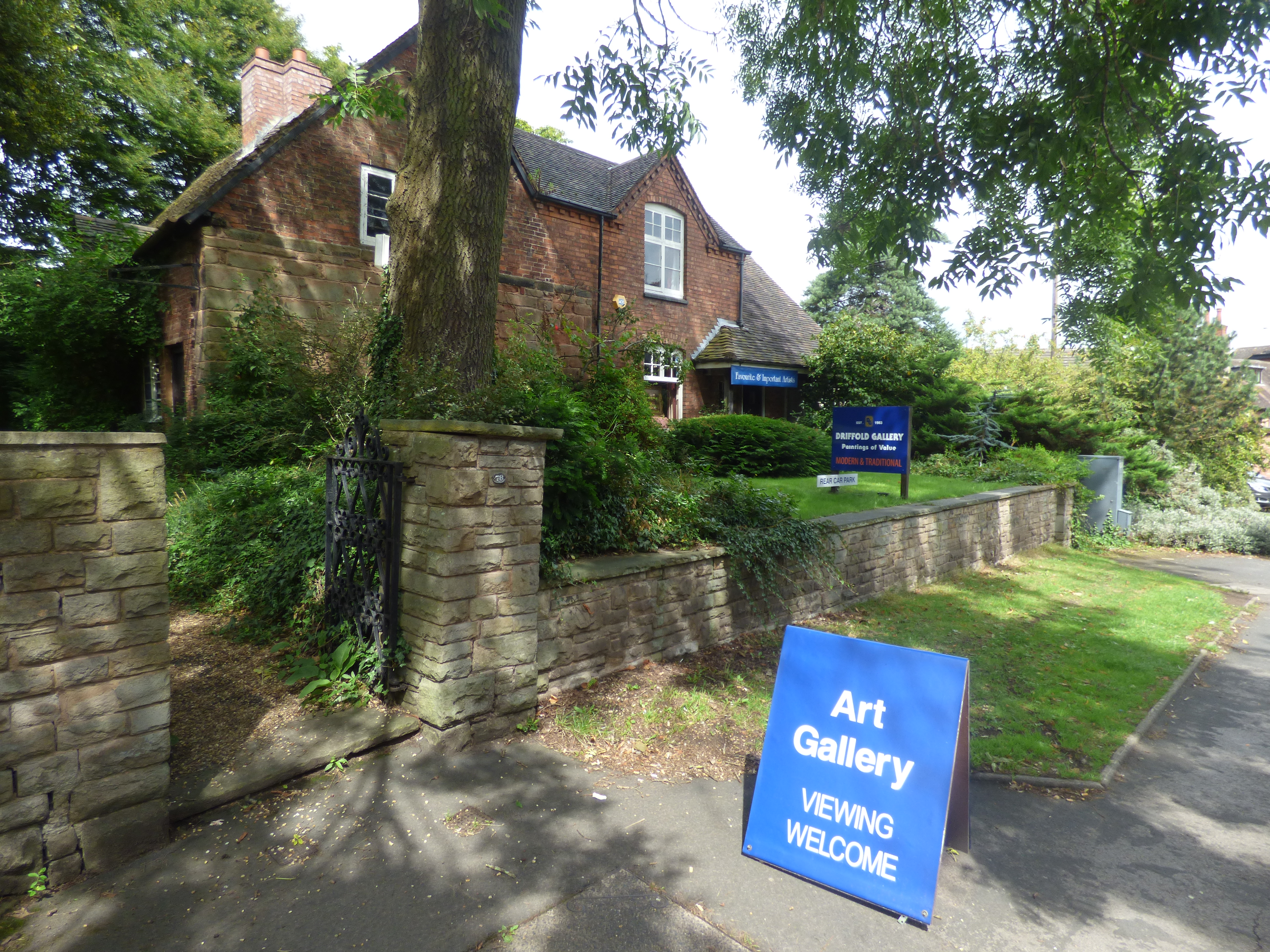
Driffold Gallery

Driffold is a small area of Sutton Coldfield in Birmingham, England. It forms the southeastern corner of Sutton Park around Wyndley Pool.
