= Buckland End =

Area of Birmingham, England

- Area
- Location in the West Midlands
- Coordinates: 52.4980°N 1.7874°W
- Country: United Kingdom
- Constituent country: England
- Region: West Midlands
- Metropolitan borough: Birmingham

Buckland End is an area of Birmingham, England.
