= Lee Bank =

Area of Birmingham, England

Coordinates: 52°28′9″N 1°54′7″W

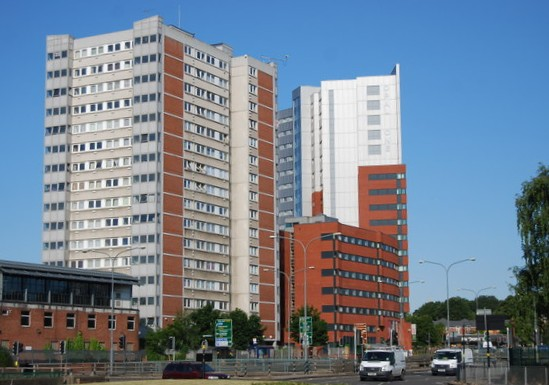
20 story block suggested by Mary Mitchell

Lee Bank was an inner city area of Birmingham, England. It was part of the Edgbaston and Ladywood wards, inside the Middle Ring Road or Middleway, which surrounds Central Birmingham. It was re-named to Park Central as part of a regeneration scheme in the early 2000's.

Lee Bank's neighbouring areas are Edgbaston, Ladywood, Highgate and Balsall Heath.

Nearby is the former site of Matthew Boulton College before it moved to the Eastside, and a new development called Opal One consisting of student housing.

Famous people that have lived on the estate include the former pop duo Hot 'N' Juicy, who achieved fame when their song, Horny, was remixed by Mousse T.

== History ==
=== Victorian era to World War II ===
Historically, the area consisted of Victorian back-to-back slum housing. Unlike most industrial cities of the time these properties took the form of 3 and 4 storey courtyard based housing (with several families sharing one house). In the early 1930s, the notion of slum clearances had become popular in the country, however, clearing Lee Bank was delayed until after World War II.

During World War II, Lee Bank was also the victim of night bombing raids by the Luftwaffe. Grant Street, for example, was heavily damaged by a raid on November 19, 1940. The raid resulted in the demolition of 80 houses and a further 200 requiring reparations, as well as the death of five people.

=== Post-World War II redevelopment ===
After World War II, Lee Bank was designated as one of five redevelopment areas, which meant that regeneration of the area was encouraged by Birmingham City Council. It was named the Bath Row Redevelopment Area, and in 1948, the Birmingham Public Works Department produced a painting exhibiting their vision for the site. It consisted of numerous tower blocks in a Swedish-style mixed-use development, bounded by a ring road with fly-overs. Clearing of the estate did not begin until the 1950s when the Middle Ring Road was being developed. This required the destruction and realignment of Lee Bank Road.

About a quarter of the estate was designed in 1960 as a single unit by the then City Architect A.G. Sheppard Fidler. These consisted of 6-8 storey, brick built structures, however, when landscape architect Mary Mitchell was appointed to help in the design, 20 storey tower blocks were introduced. The Lee Bank project was approved in stages between 1963 and 1967. It consisted of four 20 storey tower blocks, containing 464 flats, and one 12 storey tower block.

The area was constructed in the early to late 1960s into a large council estate with a mixture of housing and high and low rise flats. George Wimpey were commissioned by the council to design and construct the 20-storey tower blocks, as negotiated as part of a contract with A.G. Sheppard Fidler, the city architect for Birmingham. Charlecote Tower was topped out in February 1965, the first of the tower blocks to do so. By this time, A.G. Sheppard Fidler had walked out. Charlecote Tower was completed in 1965 and was followed by Chatsworth Tower and Packwood House in 1966. In 1967, Haddon Tower was completed, and in 1968, Longleat Tower was completed. Packwood House was the only 12 storey tower block on the estate.

The first multi-storey housing blocks to be completed were Avon, Nash and Lansdown House. They were originally not part of the Bath Row development, however, they were incorporated into the estate in later years. They were built in the 1950s, before most of the estate had been cleared and prepared for regeneration . They are named after the River Avon flowing through Bath, Beau Nash the master of ceremonies in Bath and Lansdown Hill in Bath, respectively.

The next group of tower blocks to be built were the Middleway row blocks; Audleigh, Chiswick, Faraday and Hogarth House. These were built in the early 1960s.

Lee Bank Primary School was opened in 1967 by Princess Alexandra, The Hon Mrs Angus Ogilvy. In later years it was renamed Woodview Primary School.

The estate was officially opened by Queen Elizabeth II. It was also visited by the Queen Mother on an official royal visit. In the visit, she toured the three Y-blocks; Nash, Avon and Lansdown House. Together with a number of social housing estates near the city centre, it formed the Centre Estates group.

=== Deterioration ===
Chronic underinvestment from the mid-1980s onwards led to considerable tenant based demonstrations. The area deteriorated following a lack of maintenance. Many homes suffered from damp, and residents only got repairs from the council when they took them to court. However, repairs were still unreliable as new windows were often faulty.

There were also social problems. Anti-social behaviour was common on the estate, and there were many problems with drugs and crime. The suicide rate was 5 times the average for Birmingham and there were health problems too with half of the children on the estate suffering from asthma.

The area became known as a new slum in the 1990s, which was emphasised by local resident, Steve Austin, who achieved the area significant press attention when he covered a billboard on the edge of the estate with a poster reading "Welcome to Lee Bank, Birmingham’s Slum Quarter". Demonstrations were also held on rooftops and outside Birmingham Council House, with the slogans; "Reclaim Lee Bank". One of the most widely publicised demonstrations coincided with the Eurovision Song Contest 1998 which was being held in the city. In the demonstration, protesters scaled Birmingham Town Hall to highlight their living conditions.

=== Regeneration ===
In the late 1990s, officials from Birmingham City Council contacted residents to gather opinions and ideas into how to produce economic and social benefits for the estate in the future. In 1998, 62.1% of residents voted in favour of transferring the estate to an independent, charitable landlord.

In 1999, the 2,800 properties and substantial land holdings were transferred from Birmingham City Council to Optima Community Housing Association. The housing association also received four other estates and together formed the area of Attwood Green. They produced a master plan with the aim of redeveloping the Attwood Green area and in doing this, Attwood Green was split into five phases, one phase for each estate. Lee Bank was designated phase 1.

Optima began to work with Birmingham City Council to produce the best solution to redeveloping the Lee Bank estate. They decided that the site should be completely cleared to make way for a new housing development. They secured a grant from the Estates Renewal Challenge Fund from the government to proceed with the regeneration project. Crest Nicholson entered a partnership with Optima to develop the new housing for the tenants who lived in the area.

The project was named Park Central, and is to include two public parks with low rise housing. The first stage of redevelopment was clearance of the site. Longleat Tower was demolished along with its sister tower, Charlecote Tower, using controlled explosions in 2000 to signal the start the Park Central development. Chatsworth Tower was demolished in October 2002 by a controlled explosion and Haddon Tower was demolished on 23 July 2006, the last of the 20 storey tower blocks to be demolished. They were all demolished by Coleman & Company Ltd.

Seven tower blocks in total were refurbished. A row of four overlooking the Middleway called Audleigh, Chiswick, Faraday and Hogarth House were refurbished early in the development. A group of three shorter tower blocks known as Avon, Lansdown and Nash House were also refurbished.

The name Lee Bank is now no longer used for the area. Park Central is currently under construction with many properties already available for purchase/ rent.

Optima won the 2005 Deputy Prime Minister's Award for Sustainable Communities for its work as a community-led housing operator, run by specialists, politicians and residents.

== Transport ==
The area is bounded by the A4540, which forms the Ring Road. The section that runs along the side of Park Central is known as Lee Bank Middleway. Belgrave Junction marks the corner of the estate where the Ring Road meets the A441. The nearest train station is Five Ways railway station.
