= Ladywood =

District in Birmingham, England

Coordinates: 52.476°N 1.918°W

- Location within the West Midlands
- Population: (2011 Ward)
- OS grid reference: SP055865
- Metropolitan borough: Birmingham
- Metropolitan county: West Midlands
- Region: West Midlands
- Country: England
- Sovereign state: United Kingdom
- Post town: BIRMINGHAM
- Postcode district: B16
- Dialling code: 0121
- Police: West Midlands
- Fire: West Midlands
- Ambulance: West Midlands
- UK Parliament: Birmingham Ladywood

Ladywood is an inner-city district next to central Birmingham. It was historically in Warwickshire. In June 2004, Birmingham City Council conducted a citywide "Ward Boundary Revision" which increased the number of Birmingham wards from 39 to 40. In that review, Ladywood Ward's boundaries were expanded to include the neighbouring areas of Hockley, Lee Bank and Birmingham city centre.

== History ==
Map of the area from Pinnock's Guide to Knowledge - Number 129 (1834). Note "Lady Wood" in the top left quarter.

The area was largely developed from countryside in the mid 19th century. Between the late 19th century and the middle of the 20th century, Ladywood was a very impoverished and deprived area: it was at its worst between 1860 and 1900, when disease, infant mortality, and other early deaths were common. In the 1960s and 1970s, flats with better conditions were built by Birmingham City Council, but many were destroyed by the year 2000. During the same time, the government tried to end the "slums" of the area.

Data from the 2020s shows that unemployment is still higher than the UK average, at over 6%. There is more of a mix of different social classes than in the previous 50 years.

== Demographics ==
In the 2021 census, just over 50% of Ladywood residents were born in the UK, while 16.5% of the residents were from European countries outside the UK (including the Republic of Ireland). Around 10% were born in Africa, and around 18% were born in Asia.

Nearly 42% in Ladywood said they were white (of any background). About 25% of residents stated their ethnicity as "Asian"; and just under 23% stated they were black. About 7% said they were of mixed-ethnicity.

== Housing and land use ==
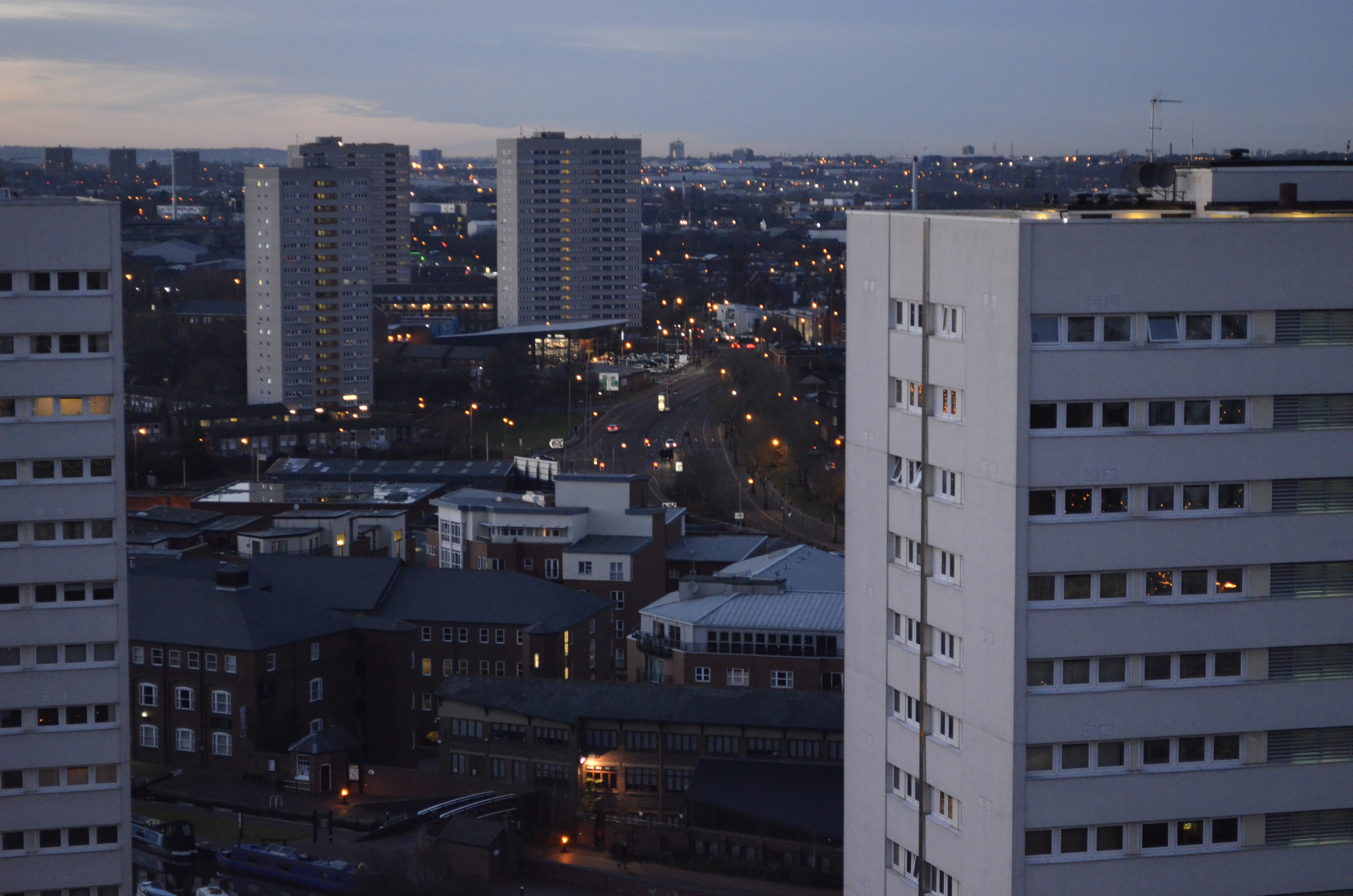
Tower blocks in the working-class area of Ladywood, 2014

The Ladywood ward combines areas of varying land-use, such that no generalisation is possible. There is the city centre (the economically valuable Central business district), the affluent Jewellery Quarter, and Broad Street areas which have become fashionable for "luxury flat" living, the Lee Bank area (now known as Park Central) which has been fully redeveloped, and there is the remainder of the ward, which is Ladywood itself (here referred to as "remainder Ladywood" – i.e., what is Ladywood itself) which is relatively economically impoverished. More than 20 multi-storey blocks of council flats were built around Ladywood during the 1960s and 1970s; however, six of them were demolished in the early 2000s.

More recently there has been investment in physical improvements to the area. Some tower blocks have been either demolished or improved, not least with introduction of concierge or CCTV security systems. These and other such measures may have resulted in a reduction of antisocial behaviour.

In July 2023, a Ladywood venue reached full capacity of around 200 people, leaving another 200 people standing outside, waiting to be briefed, after an agreement was reached between Berkeley Homes and the council to regenerate the area. The proposals envisaged adding 12,000 new homes across the 60ha estate, upgrades of existing social housing and creation of new green spaces, community facilities and local centres, but the £2.2bn partnership proved unviable and was dissolved in November 2026.

The area is served by five libraries including Spring Hill Library and Ladywood Library.

== Politics ==
The ward is currently represented by two Green Party councillors on Birmingham City Council: Siobhan Harper-Nunes and Raheem Humphreys.

Ladywood Ward has a "Committee Manager" and an "Interim Neighbourhood Manager".

The parliamentary constituency of Birmingham Ladywood is represented by Labour MP Shabana Mahmood, who holds the position of Home Secretary in the current Labour Government.

== Notable residents ==
- Walter Herbert Allcott (1889-1951), painter, born in Ladywood.
- Washington Irving (1783–1859), American writer. Inspired to write while living with family in Birmingham.
- Alfred Joseph Knight (1888–1960), World War I Victoria Cross recipient.
- J.R.R. Tolkien (1892–1973), author and academic lived in an area of Edgbaston now taken over by the extension of the Ladywood Ward boundaries.
- Dorian Yates (b. 1962), IFBB Professional Bodybuilder and 6 x Mr. Olympia.

== See also ==
- St John's Church, Ladywood
