= Birmingham New Street railway station =

Principal railway station in the West Midlands, England

Birmingham New Street
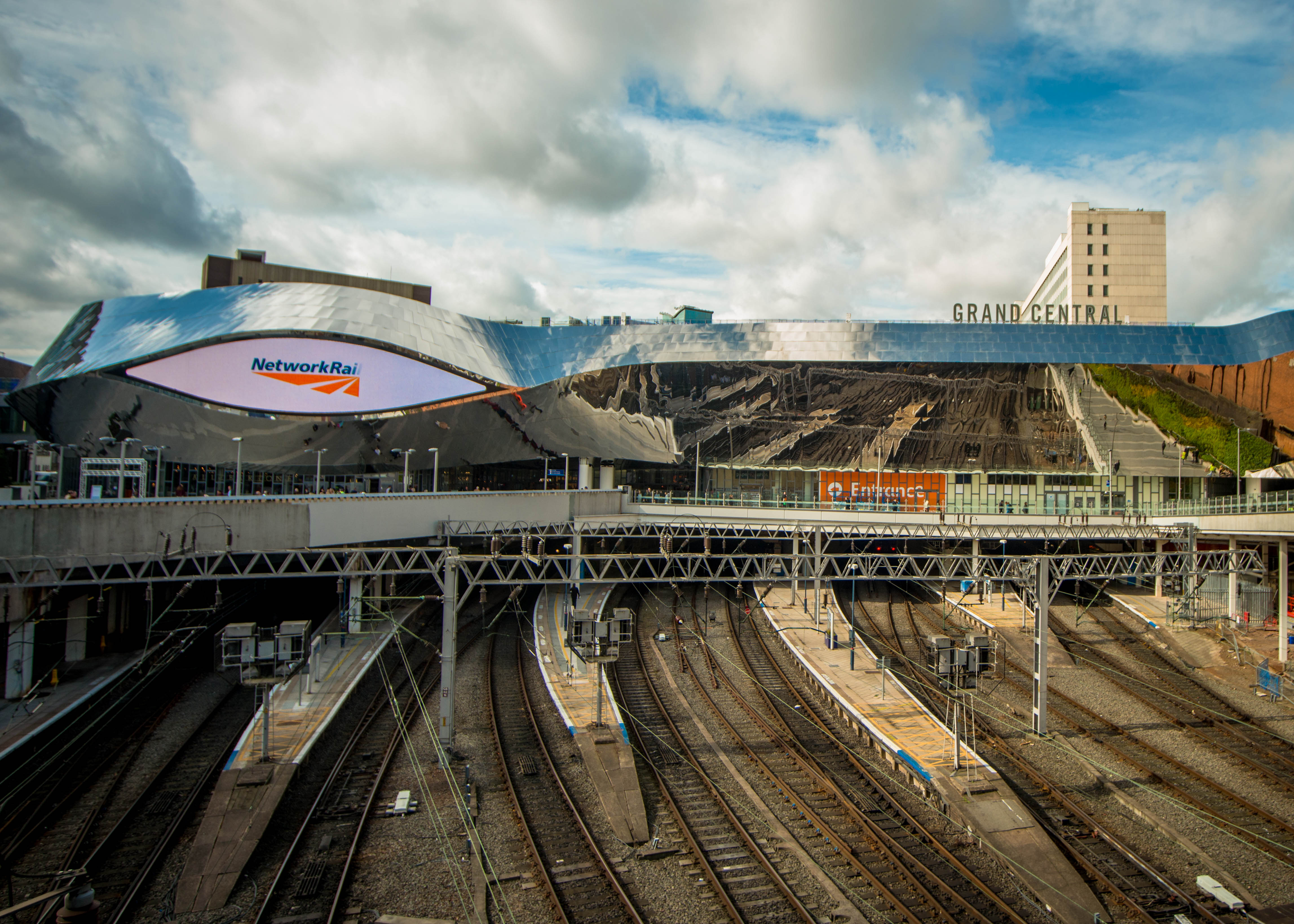
- The east end of the station, with the newly rebuilt and refurbished building which opened in 2015

General information
- Location: Birmingham, West Midlands; England
- Coordinates: 52.478°N 1.899°W
- Grid reference: SP069866
- Manager: Network Rail
- Transit authority: Transport for West Midlands
- Platforms: 13 (including 4C)

Other information
- Station code: BHM
- Fare zone: 1
- Classification: DfT category A

History
- Original company: London & North Western Railway

Key dates
- 1 June 1854: First opened
- 8 February 1885: Extension opened
- 1964–1967: Rebuilt
- 2010–2015: Redeveloped

Passengers
- 2021/22: ▲22.683 million
- Interchange: ▲3.509 million
- 2022/23: ▲30.726 million
- Interchange: ▲4.328 million
- 2023/24: ▲33.335 million
- Interchange: ▲5.107 million
- 2024/25: ▲36.624 million
- Interchange: ▲5.641 million
- 2025/26: ▲38.775 million
- Interchange: ▲6.146 million
Location
Notes
- Passenger statistics from the Office of Rail and Road

Birmingham New Street, also known as New Street station, is the largest and busiest of the three main railway stations in Birmingham city centre, England. It is a central hub of the British railway system. The station is a major destination for Avanti West Coast services from London Euston, Preston, Glasgow Central and Edinburgh Waverley, and West Midlands Trains services from Liverpool Lime Street and London Euston both via the West Coast Main Line. The CrossCountry network centres on New Street, as well as local and suburban services within the West Midlands; these include those on the Cross-City Line between Lichfield Trent Valley, Redditch and Bromsgrove, the Chase Line to Walsall and Rugeley Trent Valley, and the Camp Hill line to Kings Norton. The three-letter station code is BHM.

The station is named after New Street, which runs parallel to it, although the station has never had a direct entrance from New Street except via the Grand Central shopping centre. Historically, the main entrance was on Stephenson Street, just off New Street. As of 2022, the station has entrances on Stephenson Street, Smallbrook Queensway, Hill Street and Navigation Street.

New Street is the thirteenth busiest railway station in the UK and the busiest outside London, with 38.8 million passenger entries and exits between April 2025 and March 2026. It is also the busiest interchange station outside London, with over 5 million passengers changing trains there annually. In 2018, New Street had a passenger satisfaction rating of 92%, the third highest in the UK.

The original New Street station opened in 1854. At the time of its construction, the station had the largest single-span arched roof in the world. In the 1960s, the station was completely rebuilt. An enclosed station, with buildings over most of its span and passenger numbers more than twice those for which it was designed, the replacement was not popular with its users. A £550m redevelopment of the station named Gateway Plus opened in September 2015; it includes a new concourse, a new exterior facade and a new entrance on Stephenson Street.

== History ==
=== The first railway stations ===
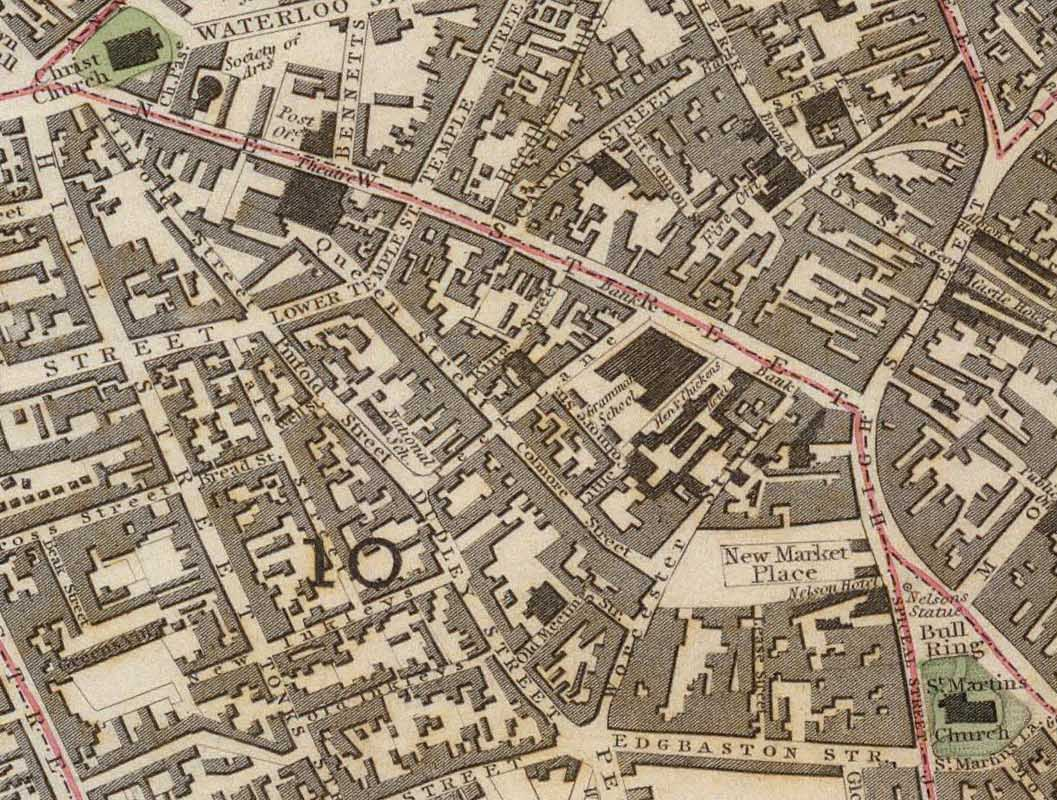
1839 map, showing the warren of streets lost to the new station, including Peck Lane, New Inkleys and Dudley Street (Note that north is not at the top of the map.)

New Street station was built in central Birmingham by the London and North Western Railway (LNWR) between 1846 and 1854, on the site of several streets in a marshy area known as "The Froggery"; it replaced several earlier rail termini on the outskirts of the centre, most notably Curzon Street, which had opened in 1838 and was no longer adequate for the level of traffic. Samuel Carter, solicitor to both LNWR and the Midland Railway, managed the conveyancing.

The LNWR originally shared the station with the Midland Railway; however, in 1885, the Midland Railway opened its own extension alongside the original station, effectively creating two stations side by side. The two companies' stations were separated by a central roadway, Queens Drive. Traffic grew steadily and, by 1900, New Street had an average of 40 trains an hour departing and arriving, rising to 53 trains in the peak hours.

==== Original LNWR station ====
London and Birmingham Railway (New Street Station) Act 1846
- Act of Parliament
- Parliament of the United Kingdom
- Long title: An Act for making a Railway from the London and Birmingham Railway to or near to Navigation Street within the Borough of Birmingham.
- Citation: 9 & 10 Vict. c. ccclix

Dates
- Royal assent: 7 August 1846

Text of statute as originally enacted

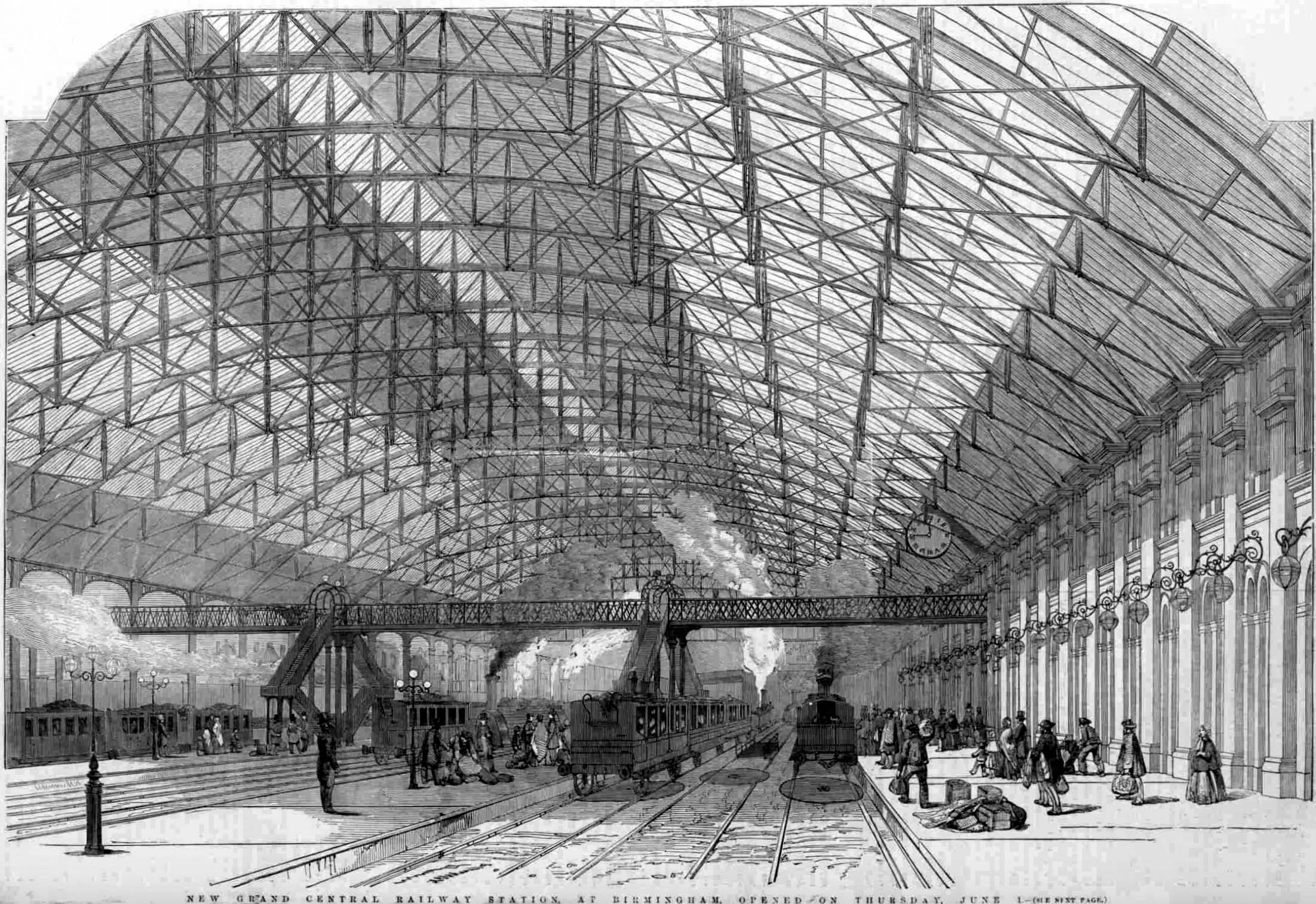
Birmingham New Street station as pictured in the Illustrated London News, 1854

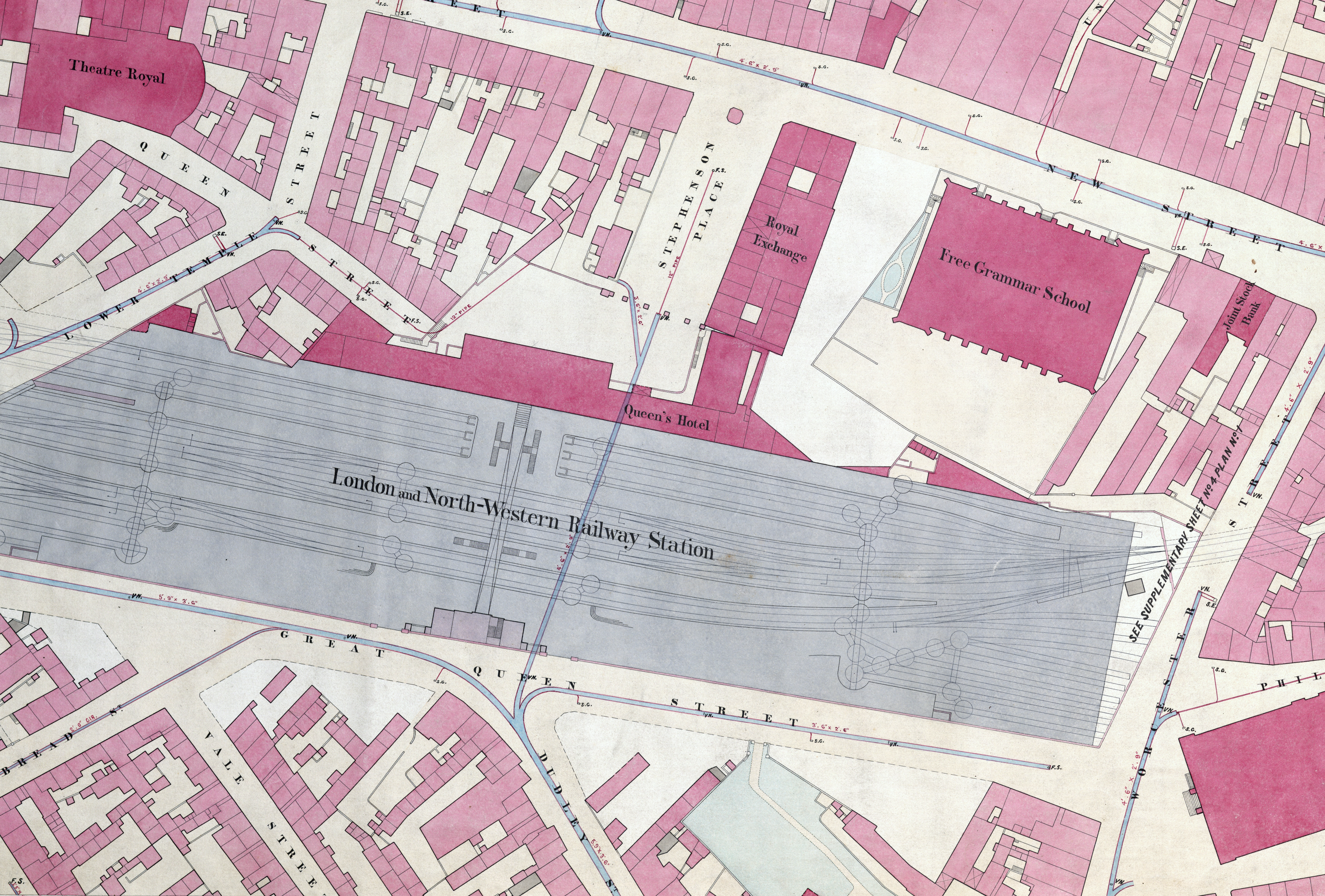
The station in 1855, featured in the New Survey of the Borough of Birmingham. Great Queen Street, running along the south face of the building, would become Queen's Drive, in the middle of the joint station.

In 1846, the LNWR had obtained an act of Parliament, the London and Birmingham Railway (New Street Station) Act 1846 (9 & 10 Vict. c. ccclix), to extend their line into the centre of Birmingham, which involved the acquisition of some 1.2 hectares (3 acres) of land and the demolition of around 70 houses in Peck Lane, The Froggery, Queen Street and Colmore Street. The Countess of Huntingdon's Connexion chapel, on the corner of Peck Lane and Dudley Street, which had only been built six years before, was also demolished. The station was formally opened on 1 June 1854, although the uncompleted station had already been in use for two years as a terminus for trains from the Stour Valley Line, which entered the station from the Wolverhampton direction. On the formal opening day, the LNWR's Curzon Street station was closed to regular passenger services and trains from the London direction started using New Street.

The station was constructed by Messrs. Fox, Henderson & Co. and designed by Edward Alfred Cowper of that firm, who had previously worked on the design of the Crystal Palace. When completed, New Street had the largest arched single-span iron and glass roof in the world, spanning a width of 211 feet (64 m) and being 840 ft (256 m) long. It held this title for 14 years until St Pancras station opened in 1868. It was originally intended to have three spans, supported by columns; however, it was soon realised that the columns would severely restrict the railway's operations. Cowper's single-span design, was therefore adopted, even though it was some 62 feet (19 metres) wider than the widest roof span at that time. George Gilbert Scott praised Cowper's roof at New Street, stating "An iron roof in its most normal condition is too spider-like a structure to be handsome, but with a very little attention this defect is obviated. The most wonderful specimen, probably, is that at the great Birmingham Station…" When first opened, New Street was described as the "Grand Central Station at Birmingham" by Richard Foster.

The internal layout of tracks and platforms was designed by Robert Stephenson and his assistants; the station contained a total of nine platforms, comprising four through and five bay platforms. The main entrance building on Stephenson Street incorporated Queens Hotel, designed by John William Livock, which was opened on the same day. It was built in an Italianate style and was originally provided with 60 rooms. The hotel was expanded several times over the years and reached its final form in 1917, with the addition of a new west wing. The scale of the station at this time was documented in the station's entry in the 1863 edition of Bradshaw's Guide:

The interior of this station deserves attention from its magnitude. The semicircular roof is 1,110 feet long, 205 feet wide and 80 feet high, composed of iron and glass, without the slightest support except that afforded by the pillars on either side. If the reader notices the turmoil and bustle created by the excitement of the arrival and departure of trains, the trampling of crowds of passengers, the transport of luggage, the ringing of bells and the noise of two or three hundred porters and workmen, he will retain a recollection of the extraordinary scene witnessed daily at Birmingham Central Railway Station.

The roof of the original station was strengthened with additional steel tie bars during 1906–07, as a precaution following the collapse of a similar roof which killed six people at Charing Cross station in 1905.

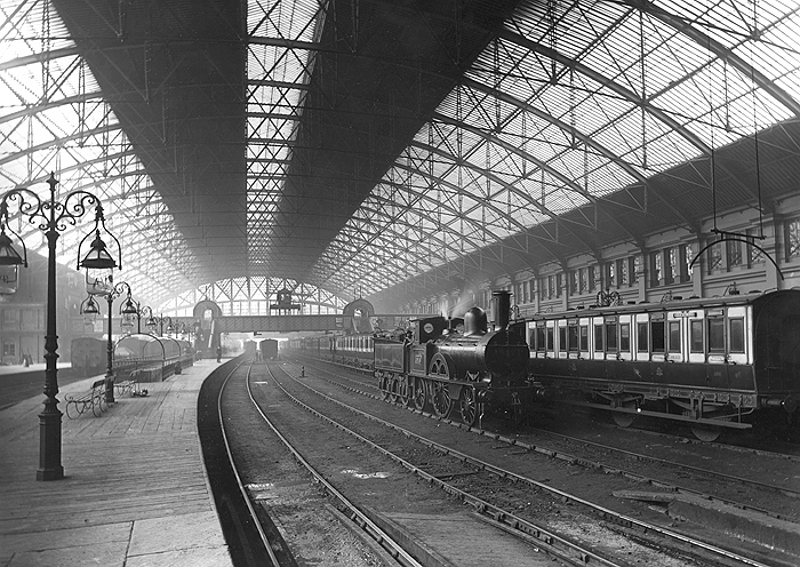
The interior of the original LNWR station in the late 19th century, with its once record-breaking roof

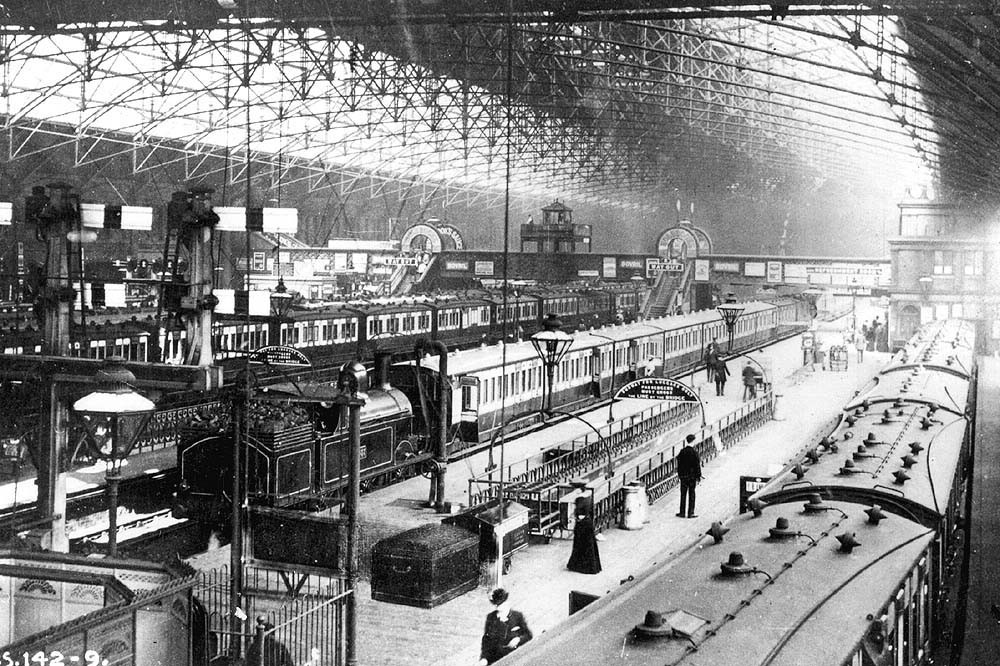
Victorian image of the interior of the LNWR station

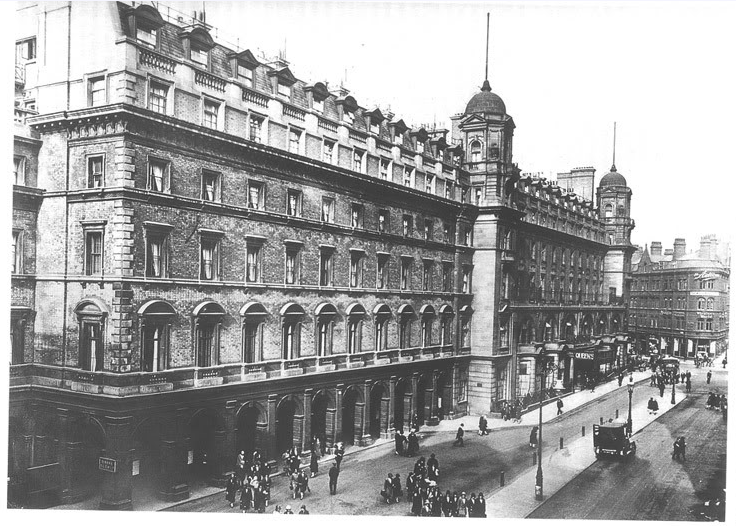
The main entrance building to the old station on Stephenson Street, incorporating Queens Hotel, c. 1920

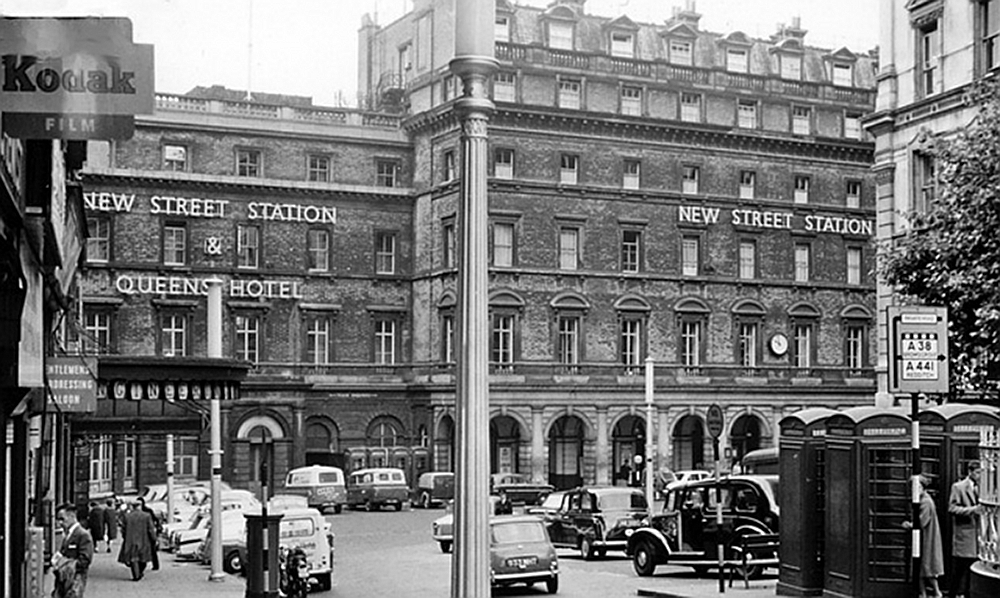
The main entrance to the old station on Stephenson Street, including Queens Hotel in 1962

==== Midland Railway extension ====
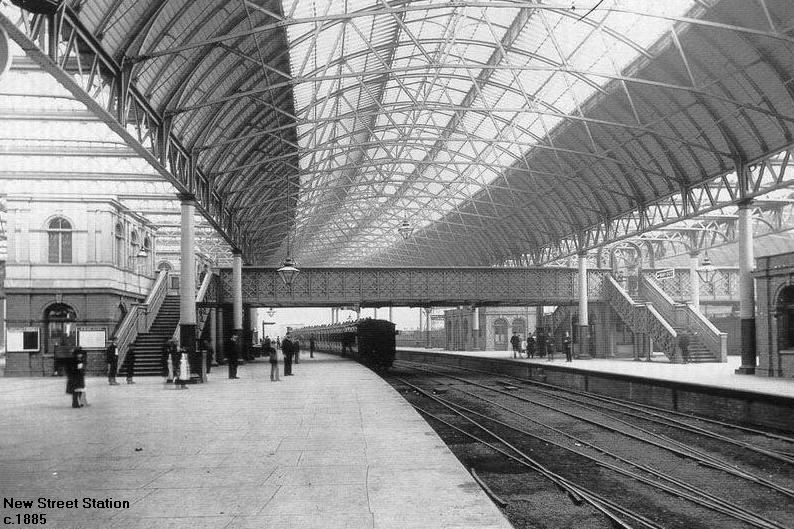
Midland Railway's extension of New Street station, in 1885

Midland Railway trains that had used Curzon Street began to use New Street from 1854; however, its use by the Midland Railway was limited by the fact that those trains going between Derby and Bristol would have to reverse, so many trains bypassed New Street and ran through Camp Hill. This was remedied in 1885, when a new link to the south, the Birmingham West Suburban Railway, was extended into New Street, which allowed through trains to and from the south-west to run via New Street without reversing.

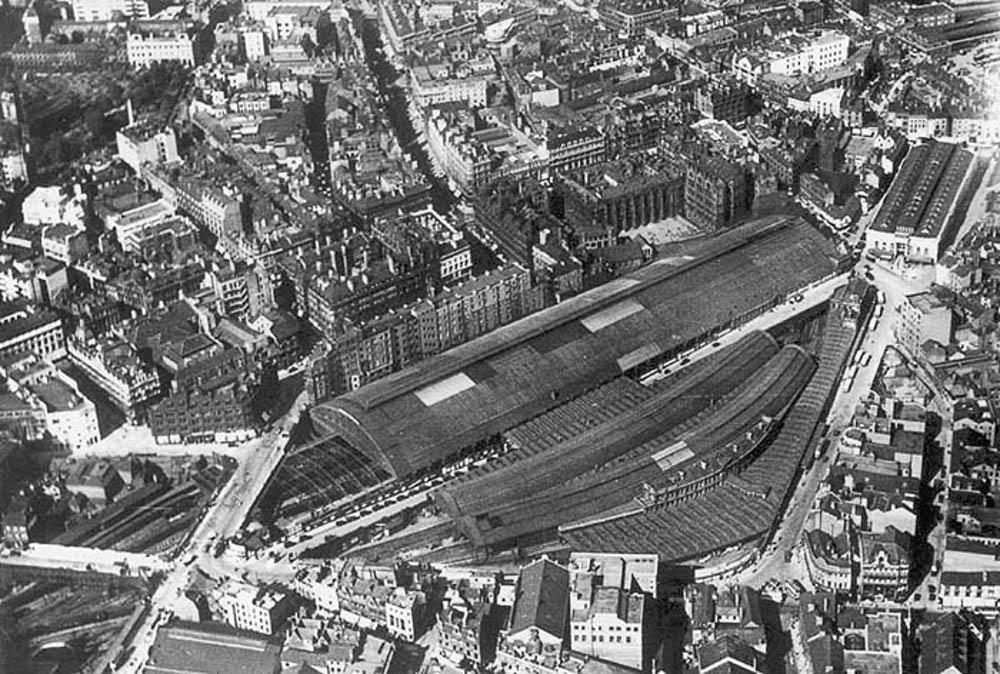
Aerial view of New Street from the early 20th century, showing the LNWR station (top) and the Midland station (bottom) side by side, with Queens Drive between them

To cope with the increase in traffic that this would bring, the station required an extension; the construction of which began in 1881. A number of buildings, mostly along Dudley Street, were demolished to make room for it, including a number of cottages, some business premises and a small church. Built immediately to the south of the original station, the extension contained four through platforms and one bay. It consisted of a trainshed with a glass and steel roof comprising two trussed arches, 58 ft (18 m) wide by 620 ft (189 m) long, and 67 ft 6 in (21 m) wide by 600 ft (183 m) long. It was designed by Francis Stevenson, chief engineer to the LNWR. The extension was opened on 8 February 1885. On completion, New Street had nearly doubled in size and became one of the largest stations in Britain, covering an area of over twelve acres (4.9 ha).

Map published August 1881, showing the planned extension of the station

In early 1885, the number of daily users of the station was surveyed. On a Thursday, the number was 22,452 and on a Saturday it was 25,334.

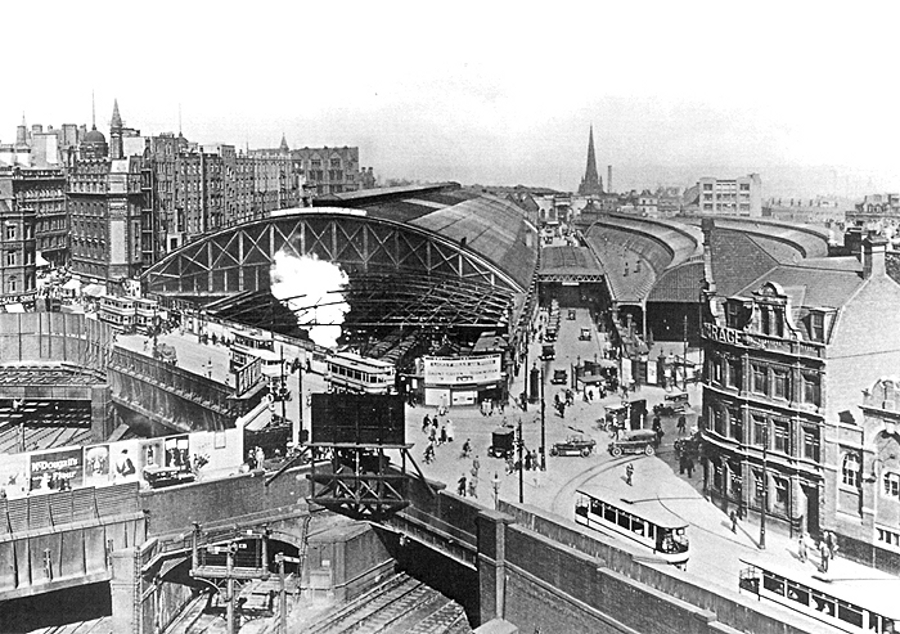
Early 20th century photo taken from the west, showing the LNWR station (left) and the Midland station (right) with the Queens Drive between them

Initially, the extension was used by both the LNWR and Midland Railway but, from 1889, it was only used by Midland Railway trains. It was separated from the original LNWR trainshed by Queens Drive, which became a central carriageway, but the two were linked by a footbridge which ran over Queens Drive and across the entire width of both the LNWR and Midland stations. Queens Drive was lost in the 1960s rebuild, but the name was later carried by a new driveway, which served the car park and a tower block, and is now the access route for the station's taxis.

On 1 February 1910, the LNWR introduced a City to City service between New Street and Broad Street, in the City of London. The service only lasted for five years, before being withdrawn on 22 February 1915, as a result of the First World War.

==== LMS and British Rail ====
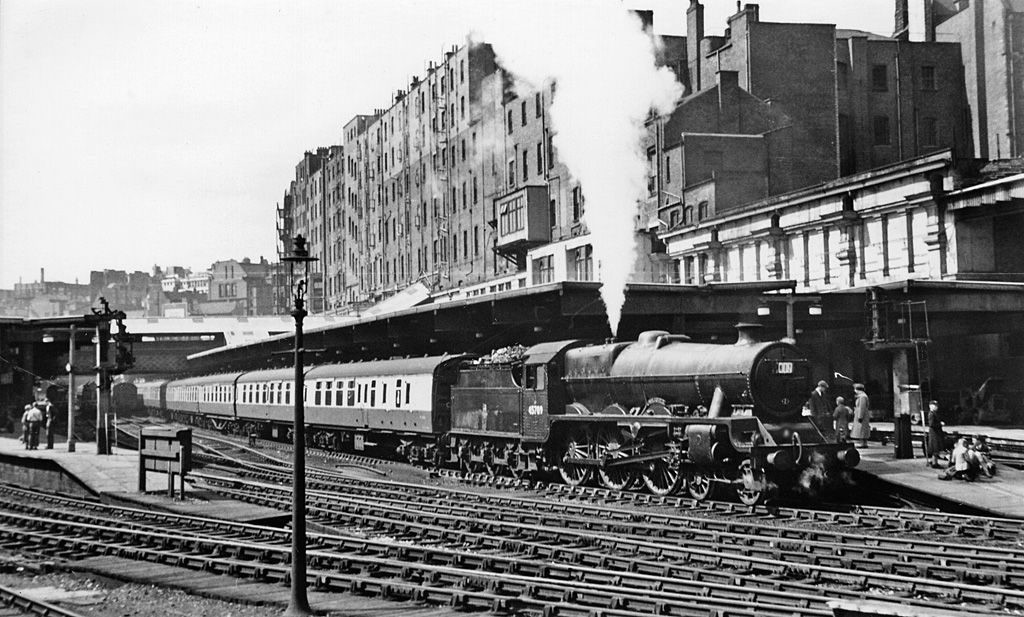
Image from 1956 of the station following the removal of the overall roof

In 1923, the LNWR and Midland Railway, with others, were grouped into the London, Midland and Scottish Railway (LMS) by the Railways Act 1921. In 1948, the railways were nationalised and came under the control of British Railways.

During the Second World War, Cowper's roof sustained extensive bomb damage as a result of air raids during the Birmingham Blitz. After the war, the remains of the roof were dismantled after being deemed beyond economic repair. It was replaced with austere canopies over the platforms, made from surplus war materials, which remained in use until the station was rebuilt in the 1960s.

=== 1960s rebuild ===
The station was completely rebuilt in the 1960s, as part of the modernisation programme for the West Coast Main Line. Demolition of the old station and Queens Hotel began in 1964 and was not completed until 1966. The rebuilt New Street station was opened on 6 March 1967 to coincide with the introduction of electric expresses on the West Coast Main Line. It cost £4.5 million to build (equivalent to £71,700,000 in 2025).

The new station was designed by Kenneth J. Davies, lead planner for British Rail's London Midland Region. Twelve through platforms replaced the eight through and six bay platforms of the previous station. The platforms were covered over by a seven-acre (2.8 ha) concrete deck, supported by 200 columns, upon which the concourse and other buildings were constructed. Escalators, stairs and lifts were provided to reach the platforms from the concourse. The new station had sold its air rights, leading to the construction of the Pallasades Shopping Centre (then known as the Birmingham Shopping Centre) above the station between 1968 and 1970. The public right of way across the station, which had previously been maintained by the station footbridge, was retained in the new station via a winding route through the shopping centre. The station and the Pallasades were partly integrated with the Bullring Shopping Centre via elevated walkways above Smallbrook Queensway.

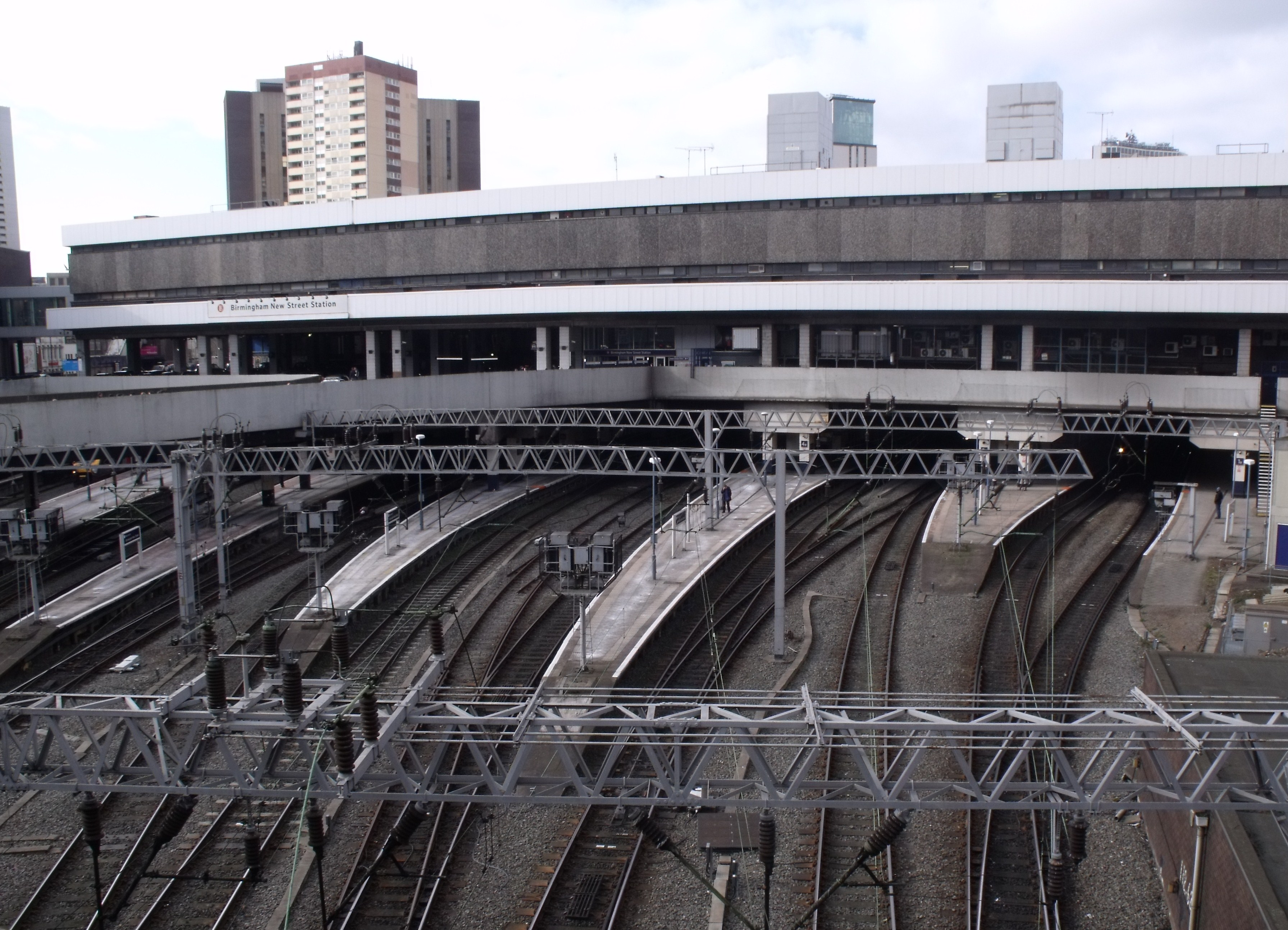
Approach tracks, platforms and exterior of 1960s New Street from the east, seen in 2010

Also above the station was a nine-storey office block called Ladywood House, and a multi-storey car park dating from the 1970s. The car park closed in May 2012; it was demolished to provide space for the new concourse and was rebuilt. Stephenson Tower, a 20-storey residential tower block, was built alongside the station between 1965 and 1966. The tower, designed by the City Architect of Birmingham, was demolished in March 2012 as part of the station redevelopment.

In 1987, twelve different horse sculptures by Kevin Atherton, titled Iron Horse, were erected between New Street station and Wolverhampton at a cost of £12,000. One stands on platform 7 at New Street.

Due to its enclosed sub-surface platforms, New Street was designated as an underground station by the fire service. In the 1990s, a number of changes had to be made to the station in order to comply with stricter fire regulations, introduced for underground stations as a result of the 1987 King's Cross fire. In 1993, a new enclosed footbridge was opened at the Wolverhampton end of the station, with access to the platforms separate from the main building; this was built primarily as a fire exit, but the new exit from the station into Navigation Street was opened to the public. All wooden fittings were removed from the platforms and new fire doors were also installed at the foot of the stairs and elevators on the platforms.

By the 2000s, the station was unpopular with its users. In a 2007 survey, it scored a customer satisfaction rate of only 52%, the joint lowest of any Network Rail major stations along with Liverpool Lime Street and East Croydon. The station had become inadequate for the level of traffic with which it was dealing; it had been designed with capacity for 650 trains and 60,000 passengers per day. In 2008, there were 1,350 trains and over 120,000 passengers per day. By 2013, it was 140,000 passengers per day. This made overcrowding and closures on safety grounds more common. Furthermore, the 1960s concrete architecture and enclosed design was widely criticised on aesthetic grounds. In November 2003, the station was voted the second biggest "eyesore" in the UK by readers of Country Life magazine. In books on railway station architecture, it was described by Steven Parissien as a "depressing underground bunker" and by Simon Jenkins as "hideous".

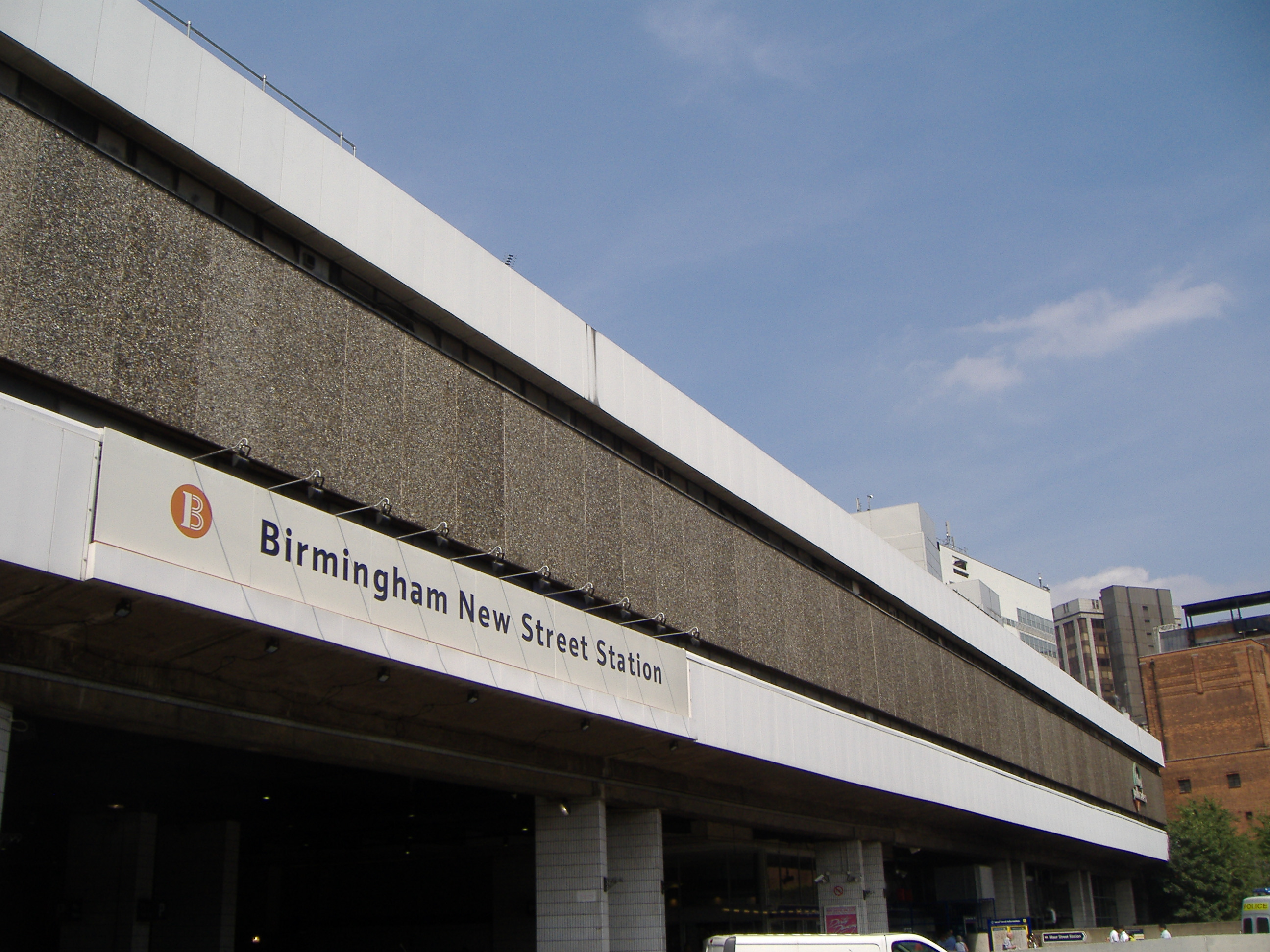
The concrete external architecture of the 1960s station

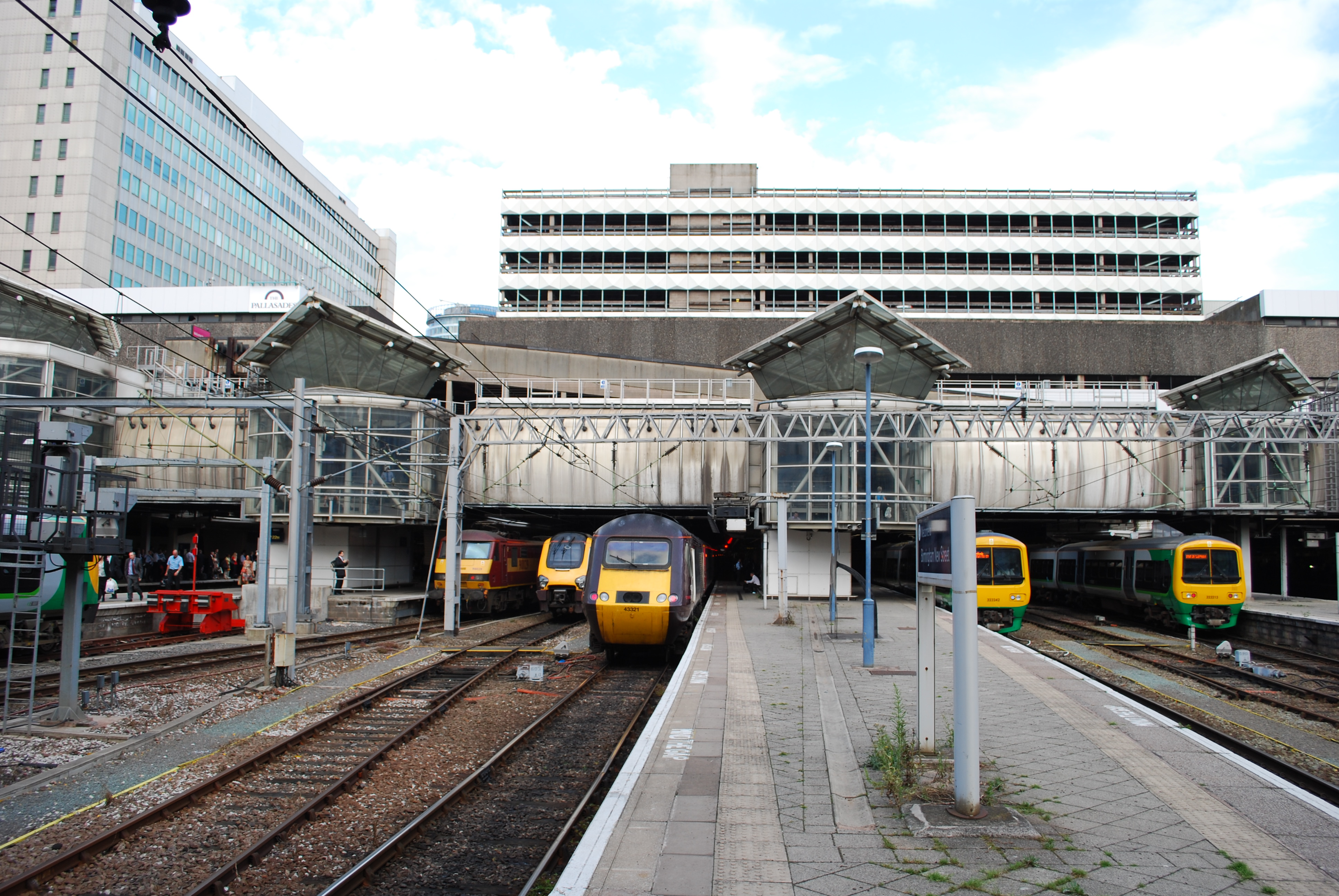
The western end of the station

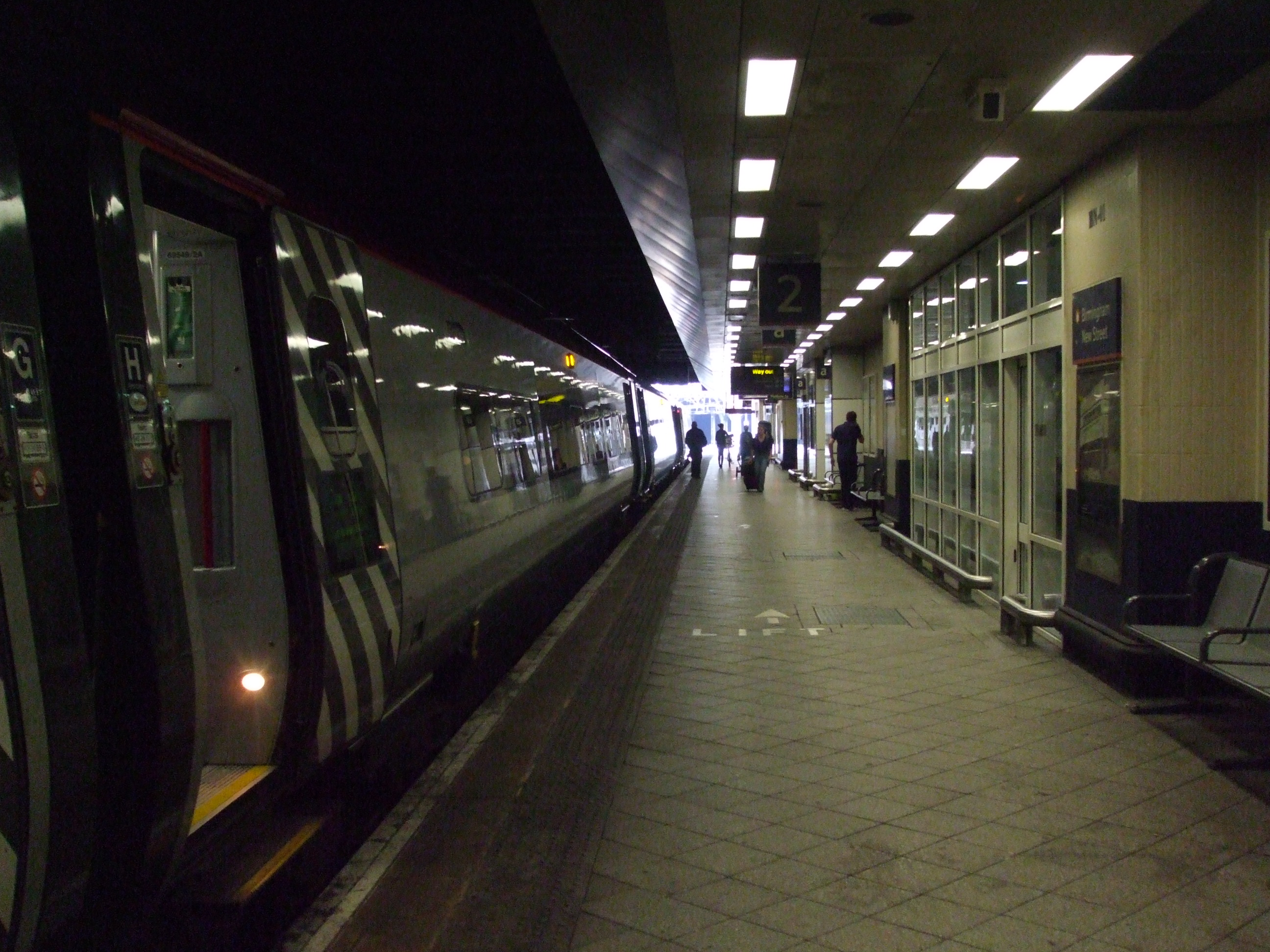
A Virgin Trains Pendolino waiting at platform 2 at New Street in 2009

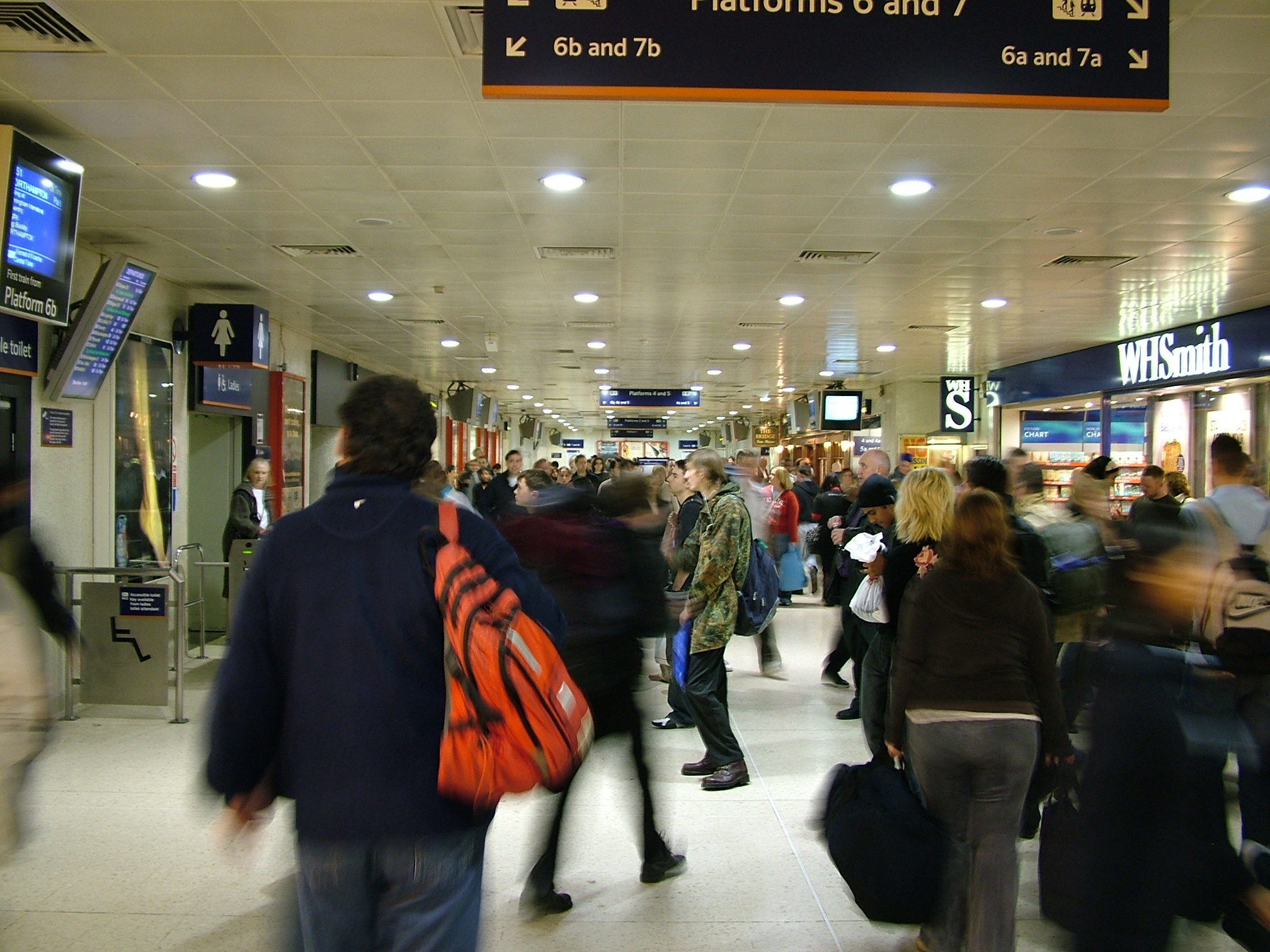
The former station concourse at rush hour

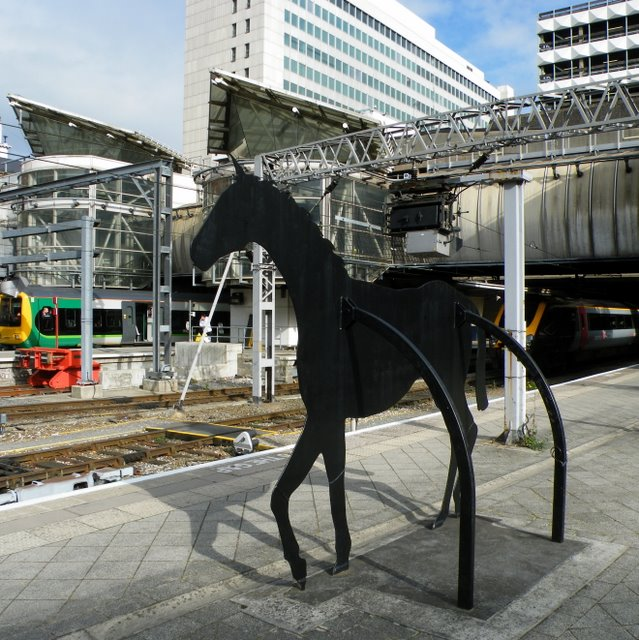
Iron Horse sculpture

==== New Street signal box ====
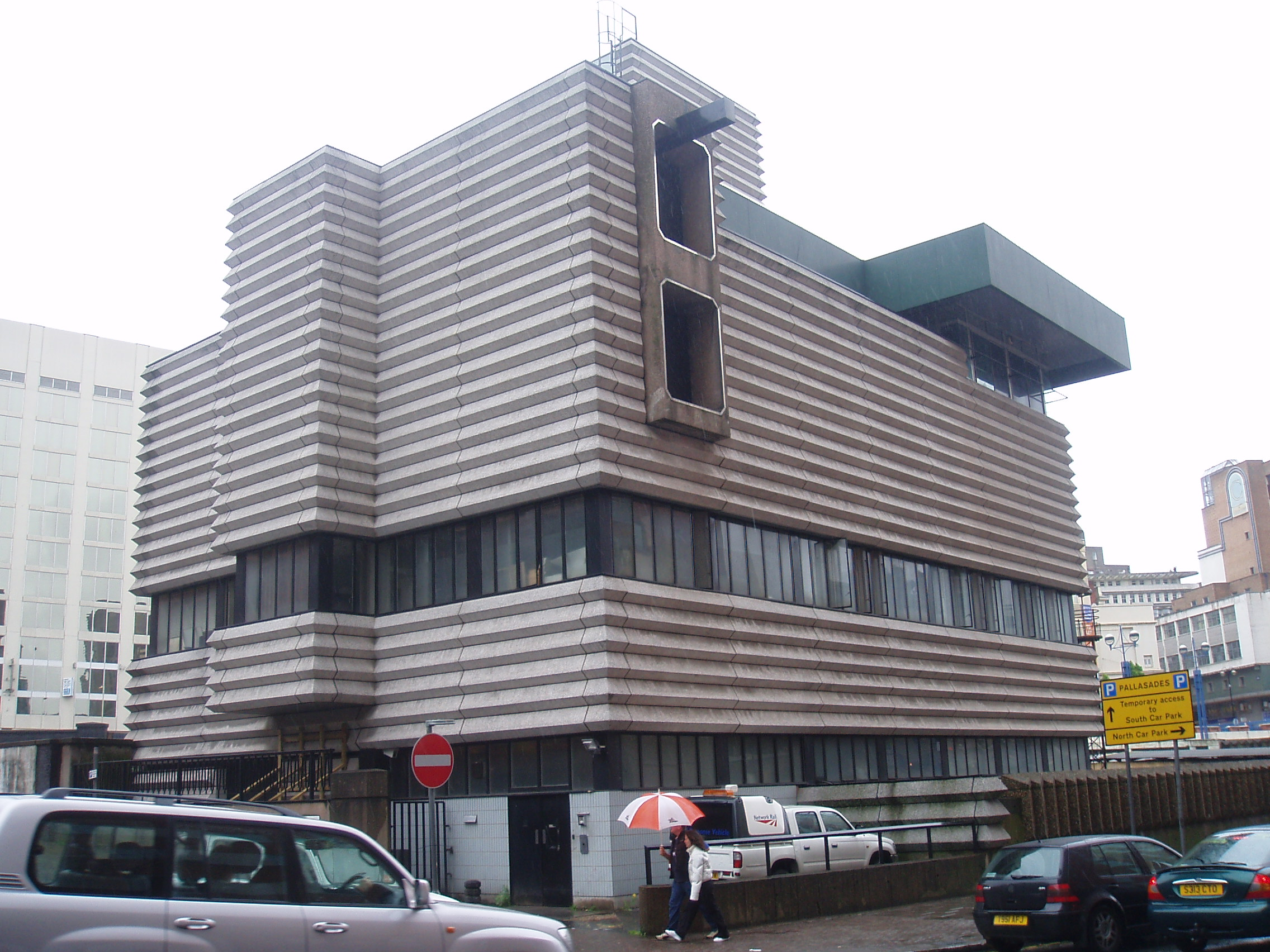
New Street signal box

The power signal box at New Street was completed in 1964 on the site of the former turntable; it housed the Westpac geographical interlocking and signalmen's push button control panel (the largest relay interlocking in the world when installed) and also the railway telephone exchange. It is a brutalist building with corrugated concrete architecture, designed by John Bicknell and Paul Hamilton in collaboration with William Robert Headley, the regional architect for British Railways London Midland Region. The eight-level structure with five main storeys, including track and street levels, and cable chamber below track level, is at the side of the tracks connected to Navigation Street. In 1995 it was protected as a Grade II-listed building. Until recently, two small sidings (nos. 2 & 3 Engine Sidings) were located in front of the signal box which were used for stabling electric locomotives; this was in connection with locomotive changes from diesel to electric traction on cross-country services heading north. As they are no longer needed, these have now been removed in connection with the ongoing resignalling project for the station area. No. 1 Engine Siding was located at the north end, between platforms 4 and 5, and was lengthened some years ago to form platform 4C.

==== Don's Miniature New Street ====
A Sutton Coldfield model railway enthusiast, Don Jones, built a scale model of the entire 1960s station and surrounding buildings including the Rotunda, the old Head Post Office and the signal box, at OO scale; open days were held to raise funds for local charities. Private visits were held for Robert Redford and King Hussein of Jordan.

=== 2010–2015 redevelopment ===
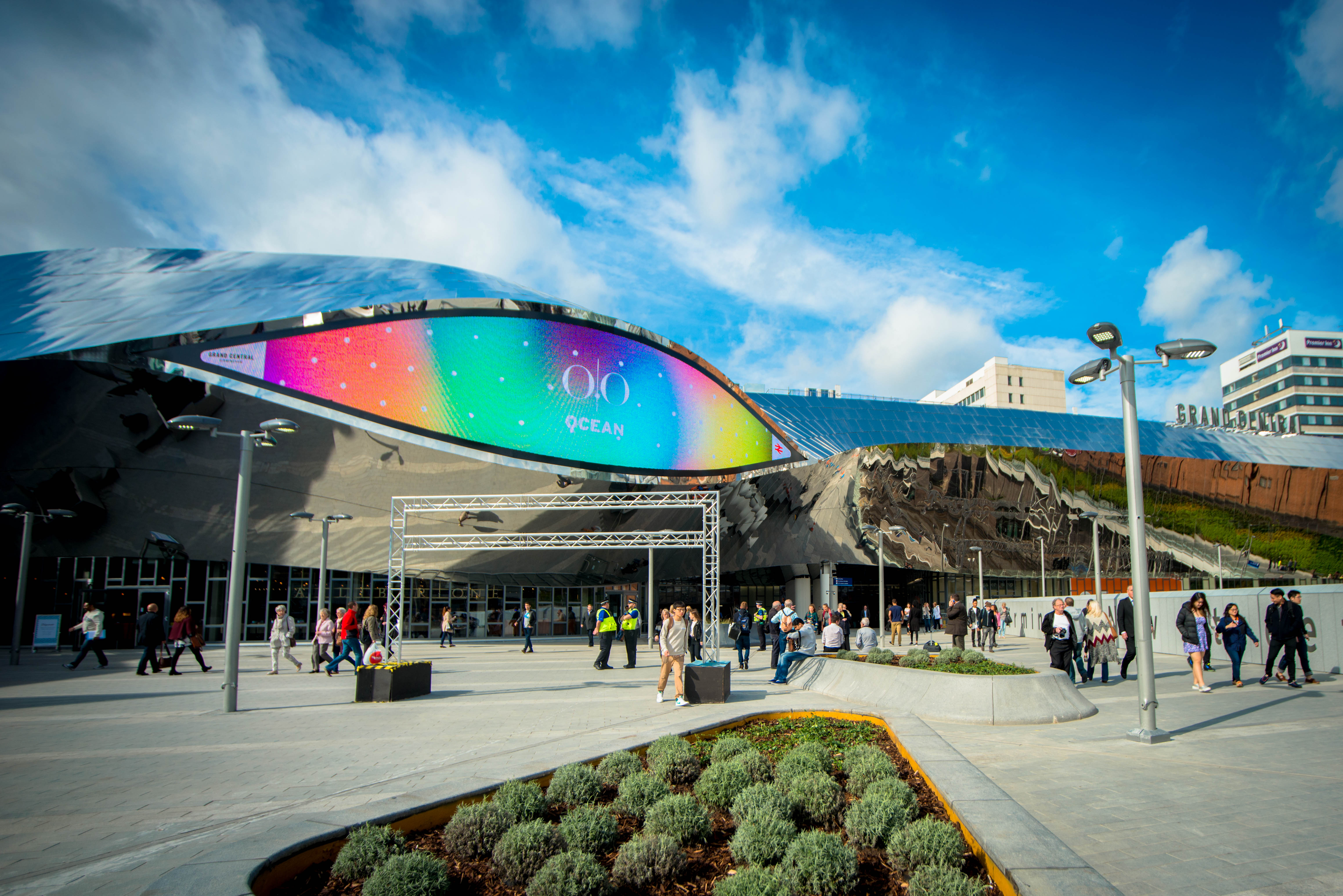
The new eastern entrance to the station

As a result of the problems with the existing station, proposals to redevelop the station gained traction in the mid-2000s. A feasibility study was approved in January 2005. Designs were shown to the public in February 2006 for a new Birmingham New Street Station, in a project known as Gateway Plus. A regeneration scheme was launched in 2006 and evolved through names such as Birmingham Gateway, Gateway Plus and New Street Gateway. The scheme proposed complete rebuilding of the street-level buildings and refurbishment of the platforms by 2013, with track and platform level remaining essentially unchanged.

The approved planning application of August 2006 showed a glass facade with rounded edges. The entrance on Station Street originally included two curved 130 metres (427 ft) tall towers on the site of Stephenson Tower. Due to the economic slowdown, the "twin towers" plan was shelved.

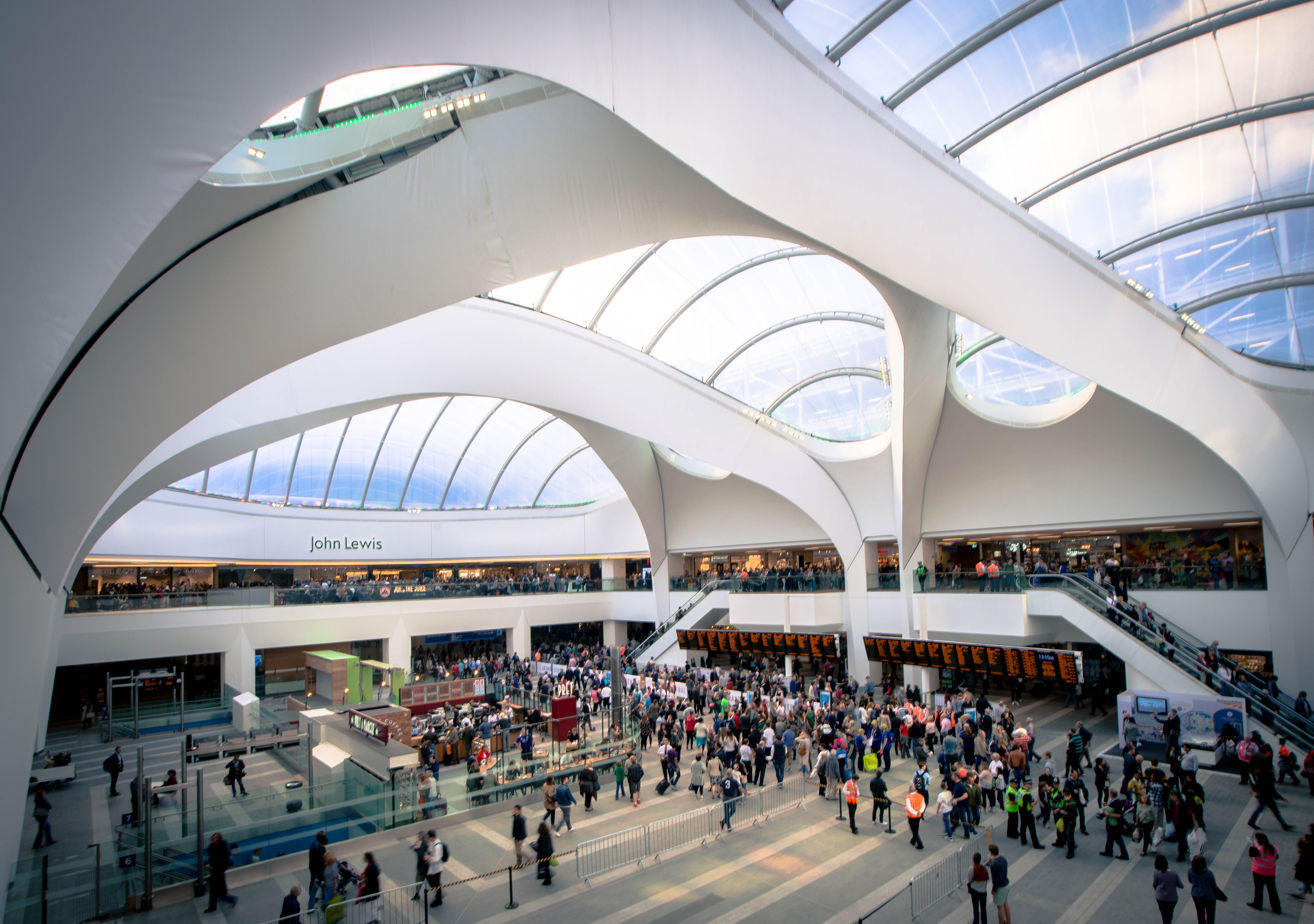
The new concourse opened in 2015.

In February 2008, the Secretary of State for Transport, Ruth Kelly, announced that the Department for Transport would provide £160 million in addition to £128 million through the government white paper Delivering a Sustainable Railway. A further £100 million came from the Department for Business, Enterprise and Regulatory Reform and channelled through Advantage West Midlands, the regional development agency. The announcement brought total government spending on the project to £388 million. After earlier proposals were discarded, six architects were shortlisted to design the new station following a call for submissions and it was announced, in September 2008, that the design by Foreign Office Architects had been chosen.

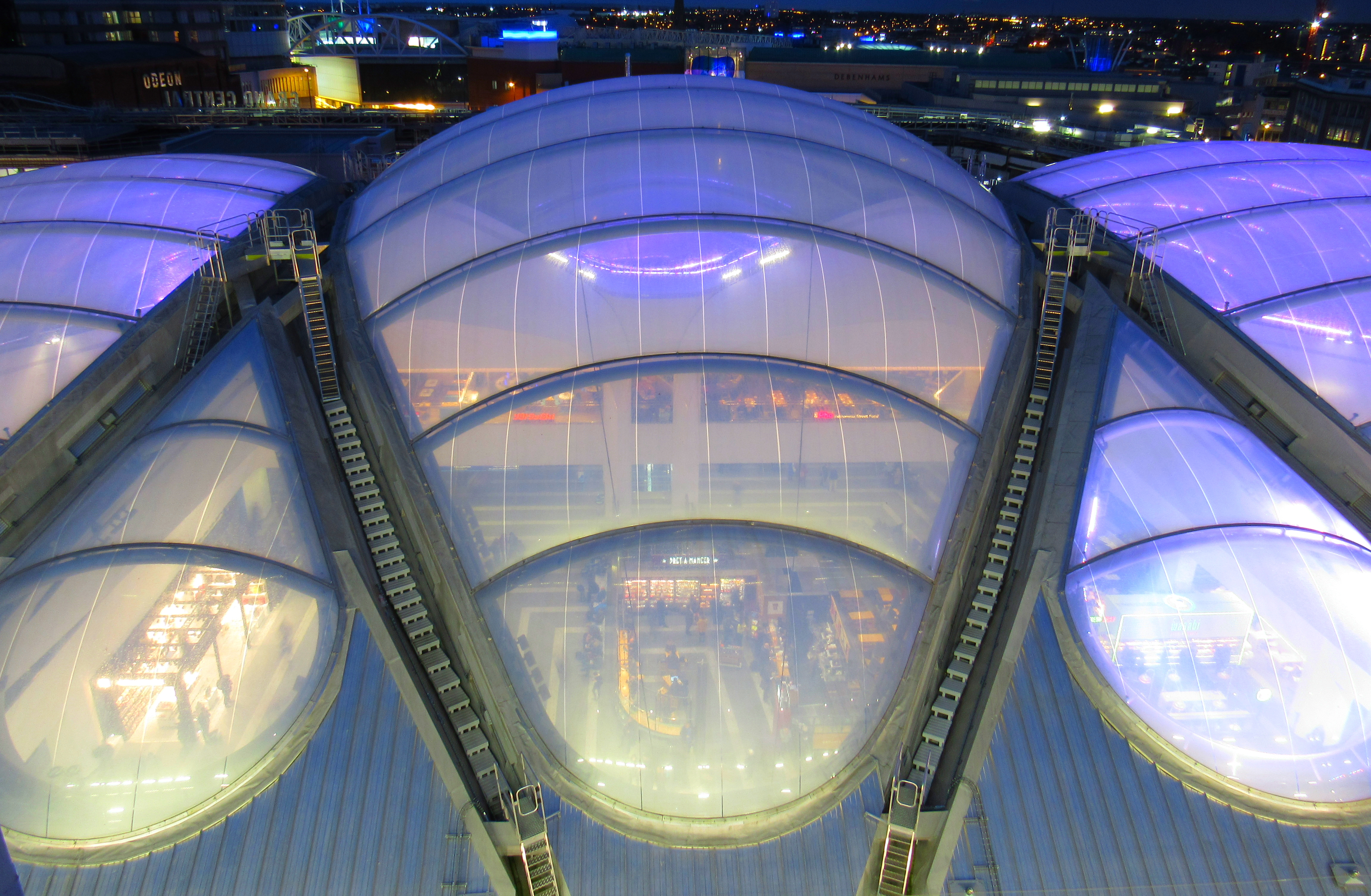
The new roof, seen from above

The approved plans for the redevelopment included:

- A new concourse three-and-a-half times larger than the 1960s concourse, with a domed atrium at the centre to let in natural light
- Refurbished platforms reached by new escalators and lifts
- A new station facade and new entrances.

The fact that the proposed Gateway development would leave the railway capacity of the station more or less unaltered has not escaped attention. In July 2008, the House of Commons Transport Committee criticised the plans; it was not convinced they were adequate for the number of trains which could use the station. It said if the station could not be adapted, then the government needed to look for alternative solutions which potentially included a completely new station in the city.

Work began on the redevelopment on 26 April 2010. Construction was completed in phases to minimise disruption. On 28 April 2013, one half of the new concourse was opened to the public and the old 1960s concourse was closed for redevelopment, along with the old entrances. The complete concourse opened on 20 September 2015, the Grand Central shopping centre four days later. The refurbished Pallasades Shopping Centre was renamed Grand Central and included a John Lewis department store. During heavy winds on 30 December 2015, several roof tiles blew off, landing in the adjacent Station Street, which was therefore closed by the police as a precautionary measure.

Simon Jenkins included the rebuilt station in his book Britain's 100 Best Railway Stations, describing it as retail-centred with platforms "no more dignified than before", but nevertheless "a vast improvement on its predecessor".

In 2023, the station received the permanent installation of Ozzy the Bull, a large metal statue of a bull created for the 2022 Commonwealth Games and named after famed Birmingham singer Ozzy Osbourne.

== Operations ==
Around 80% of train services to Birmingham go through New Street. The other major city centre stations in Birmingham are Birmingham Moor Street and Birmingham Snow Hill. Outside Birmingham, in Solihull, is Birmingham International, which serves Birmingham Airport and the National Exhibition Centre.

=== Railway operations ===
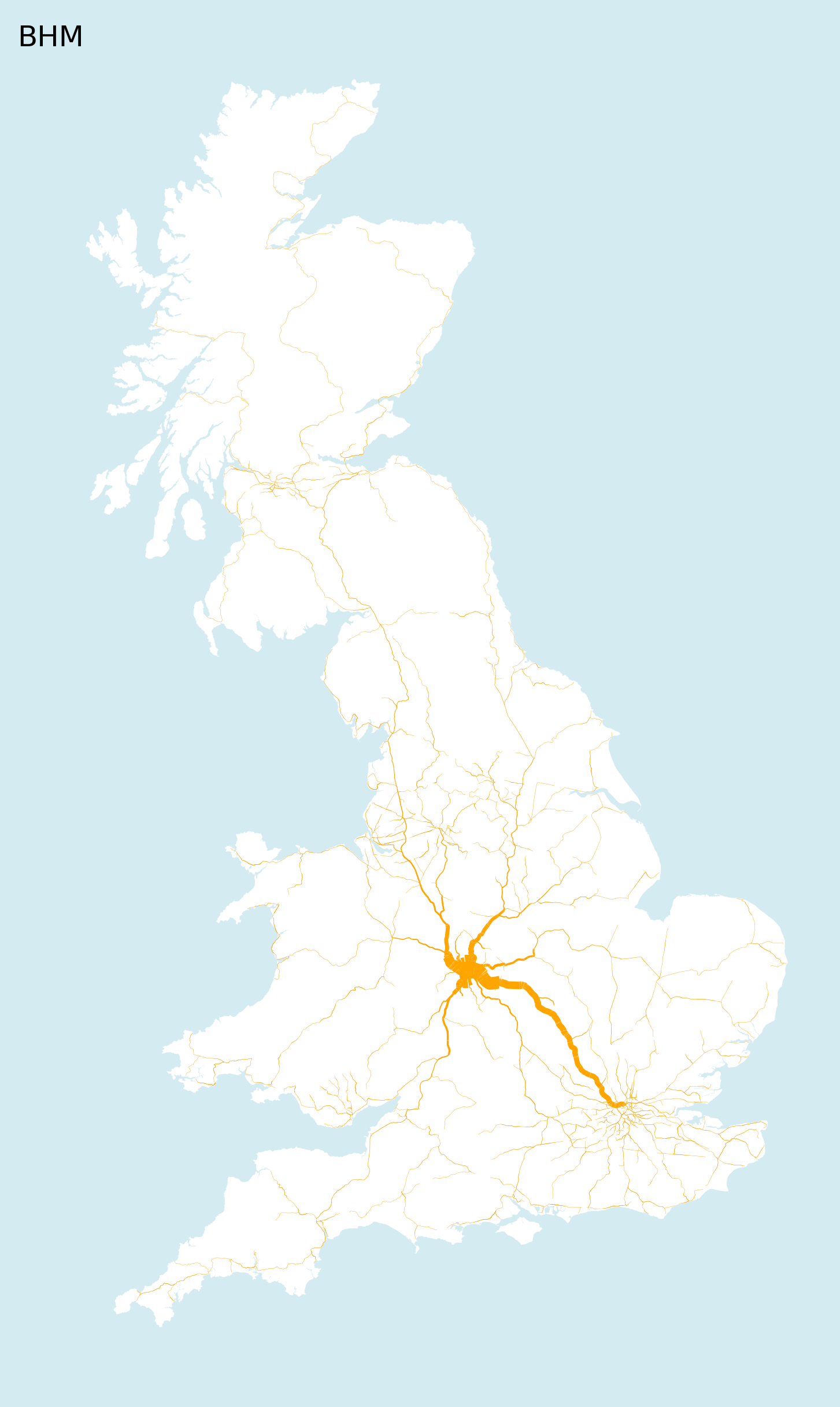
Map visualising passenger flow, using 2021/2022 ORR open data

New Street is the hub of the West Midlands rail network, as well as being a major national hub. The station is one of twenty operated and managed by Network Rail. Network Rail also provides operational staff for the station.

Station staff are provided on all platforms to assist with the safe dispatch of trains. For operational reasons, all trains departing New Street must be dispatched via the use of Right Away (RA) indicators. They display a signal informing the train driver it is safe to start the train, instead of using more traditional bell or hand signals.

The twelve through platforms are divided into a and b ends, with an extra bay platform called 4c between 4b and 5b, with the b end of the station towards Wolverhampton; this, in effect, allows twice the number of platforms. Longer trains that are too long for one section of the platform occupy the entire length of the platform, such as Class 390 Pendolinos.

Trains departing towards Proof House Junction (a end) can depart from any platform, but there are restrictions on trains departing from the b end. All platforms can accommodate trains heading towards Wolverhampton; however, due to the platform layout and road bridge supports, only 5–12 can accommodate trains heading towards Five Ways. There are a number of sidings on the station for the stabling of trains; these are between platforms 5/6, 7/8 and 9/10. The bay platforms at either end of platform 12 were removed during the 2015 refurbishment. The sidings in front of New Street signal box have also been removed.

Still in existence, but out of use, is the Royal Mail tunnel which connected the "b" end of the station platforms to the former sorting office (now called The Mailbox) alongside Suffolk Street. The tunnel to the former Head Post Office at Victoria Square is bricked up, with the subway between the platforms remaining in use for railway staff. The former baggage subway at the "a" end is now used for railway staff and as a fire exit.

All signalling is controlled by West Midlands Signalling Centre in Saltley, with the former New Street power signal box at the Wolverhampton or b end of the station; it can be seen at street level on Navigation Street. The station is allocated the IATA location identifier QQN.

==== Approach tunnels ====
All trains arriving and departing must use one of the several tunnels around the station:

- Stour Valley Line Tunnel – heads westwards towards Soho Junction & Wolverhampton and passes under the National Indoor Arena. This tunnel is 927 yards (848 m) long in total, comprising the original New Street North Tunnel 751 yards (687 m) and extension: 'Arena' Tunnel, 176 yards (161 m). The former was opened in 1852, as part of the Stour Valley Line, and holds two tracks.
- New Street South Tunnel – 254 yards (232 m) long, heading eastbound, passing under the Bullring and Birmingham Moor Street station, heading towards Duddeston, Adderley Park, the Camp Hill line and the Derby lines towards Tamworth. This tunnel opened in 1854 and originally held two tracks; it was widened in 1896 to hold four tracks, with two double-track parallel bores.
- Gloucester Line Tunnels – a series of four consecutive, separate tunnels heading south-west towards Five Ways. Heading from New Street, in sequence, the tunnels are named Holliday Street Tunnel, 307 yards (281 m) long; Canal Tunnel, 225 yards (206 m) long, passing under the Birmingham Canal Navigations; Granville Street Tunnel, 81 yards (74 m) long; and Bath Row Tunnel, 210 yards (190 m) long. These tunnels opened in 1885, as part of the Birmingham West Suburban Railway, and hold two tracks.

=== Customer service and ticketing ===
Network Rail, as well as operating the station, manages a customer reception located on the main concourse; it provides mobility assistance and train dispatch. The booking office and barriers are operated by Avanti West Coast, with customer service or floor walker staff provided by CrossCountry and Network Rail. Avanti West Coast operates a first class lounge and Network West Midlands also provides a public transport information point for the station.

The station is a penalty fare station for West Midlands Railway and London Northwestern Railway (West Midlands Trains' brands). This scheme is operated both onboard trains and at the automatic ticket barriers at the station. The other train operating companies that use the station do not operate penalty fare schemes.

=== Pollution and air quality concerns ===
The station is designated as underground. There were extractor fans that removed fumes, but these were removed with the refurbishment of the concourse and shopping centre above the platforms. They were replaced with blowers, as there are still a large number of services operated by diesel trains despite the whole station having been electrified in the 1960s. There have been environmental concerns about the level of pollution, especially NOx, in the station.

=== Train operating companies ===
Since the privatisation of British Rail, thirteen train operating companies have regularly called at New Street: Arriva Trains Wales, Avanti West Coast, Central Trains, CrossCountry, First North Western, London Midland, Silverlink, Virgin CrossCountry, Virgin Trains West Coast, Transport for Wales, Wales & Borders, Wales & West and West Midlands Trains.

Currently Avanti West Coast, CrossCountry, Transport for Wales and West Midlands Trains provide services from New Street: Chiltern Railways has occasionally used New Street during engineering works.

- West Midlands Trains operates a train crew depot at the station and stables some trains overnight around the station. For the most part, it uses Soho TMD for electric multiple units; its diesel multiple units are kept at Tyseley TMD, to the south-east of Birmingham.
- CrossCountry also operates a train crew depot at the station; it uses Tyseley TMD for the Class 170 units and its Voyagers are based at Central Rivers TMD.

== Services ==
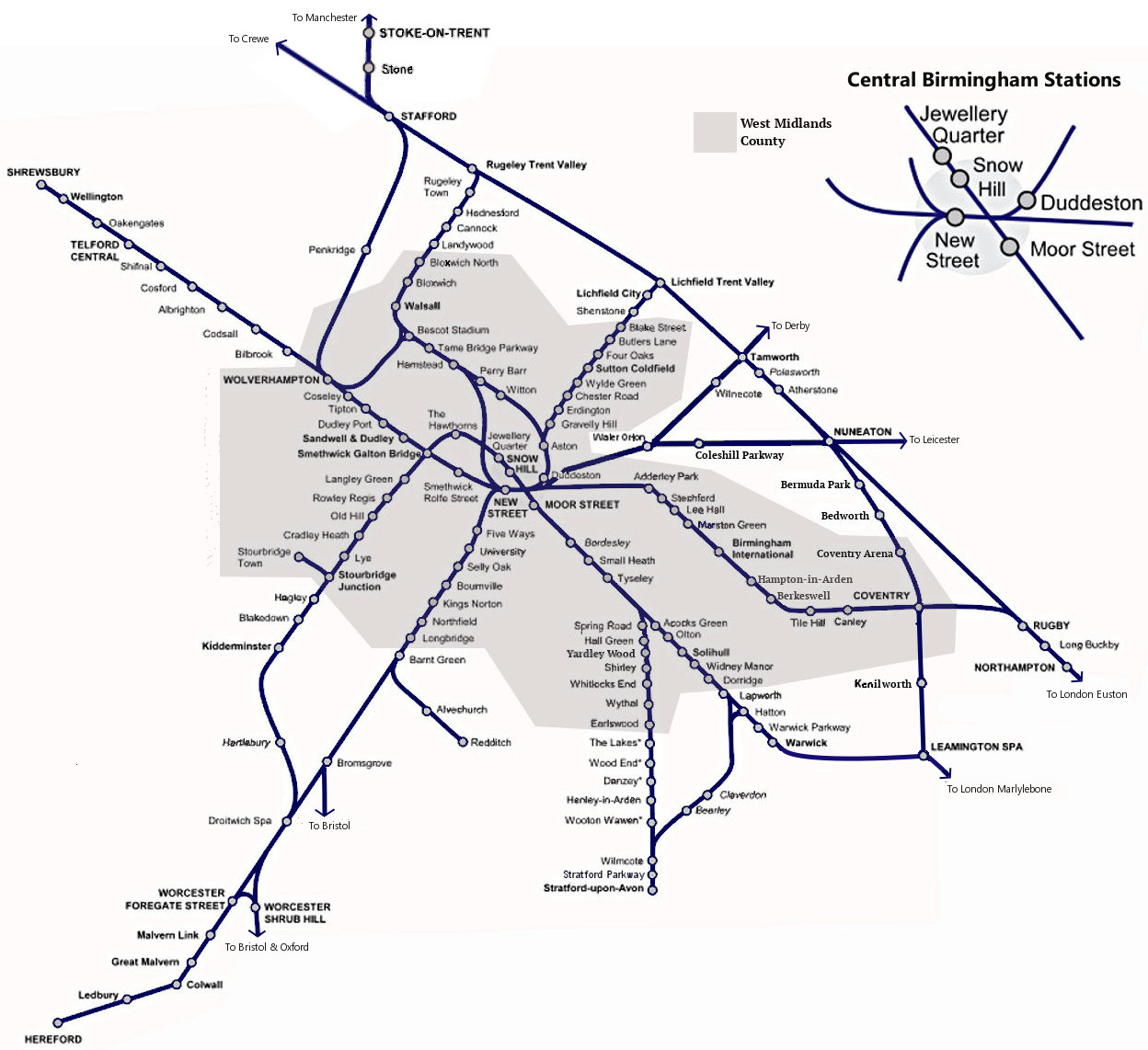
A map of passenger railways in the Birmingham and West Midlands area

The basic Monday to Saturday off-peak service in trains per hour/day is as follows:

Avanti West Coast

- 2 tph to London Euston
- 1 tph to Preston, via Wigan North Western; services alternate between continuing towards Edinburgh Waverley (1 tp2h) or Glasgow Central (1 tp2h).

CrossCountry

- 2 tph to Manchester Piccadilly, via Stoke-on-Trent
- 2 tph to Bristol Temple Meads, with 1 tph continuing on to Plymouth
- 2 tph to Nottingham, via Derby
- 1 tph to Bournemouth, via Coventry
- 2 tph to Leicester, with 1 tph continuing on to Stansted Airport
- 1 tph to Cardiff Central, via Gloucester
- 1 tph to Edinburgh Waverley, via Leeds

West Midlands Railway

- 2 tph to Bromsgrove, via University
- 2 tph to Redditch, via University
- 2 tph to Four Oaks
- 2 tph to Lichfield Trent Valley, via Four Oaks
- 2 tph to Wolverhampton
- 2 tph to Walsall
- 2 tph to Rugeley Trent Valley, via Walsall
- 2 tph to Birmingham International
- 1 tph to Hereford, via Worcester Foregate Street
- 2 tph to Shrewsbury, via Wolverhampton and Telford Central
  - 1 tph via Tame Bridge Parkway
  - 1 tph via Smethwick Galton Bridge
- 2 tph to Kings Norton, via Camp Hill line

London Northwestern Railway

- 2 tph to London Euston, via Northampton
- 2 tph to Liverpool Lime Street, via Wolverhampton and Crewe.

Transport for Wales

- 1 tph to Birmingham International
- 1 tph to Shrewsbury, continuing alternately to Chester and Holyhead, or Aberystwyth/Pwllheli.

Preceding station	National Rail	Following station
Birmingham International	Transport for Wales; Birmingham – Wales	Sandwell & Dudley
Birmingham International	CrossCountry; Bournemouth – Manchester	Wolverhampton
Cheltenham Spa	CrossCountry; Bristol – Manchester	Wolverhampton
Leamington Spa	CrossCountry; Reading – Newcastle	Derby
Tamworth or Burton-on-Trent	CrossCountry; Plymouth – Edinburgh	Cheltenham Spa
Wilnecote or Tamworth	CrossCountry; Cardiff – Birmingham – Nottingham	University or Terminus
Water Orton or Coleshill Parkway	CrossCountry; Birmingham – Leicester – Stansted Airport	Terminus
Moseley Village	West Midlands Railway; Camp Hill line	Terminus
Terminus	West Midlands Railway; Hereford – Birmingham	University
Terminus	West Midlands Railway; Shrewsbury – Birmingham	Smethwick Galton Bridge
Terminus	West Midlands Railway; Shrewsbury – Birmingham	Tame Bridge Parkway
Aston or Duddeston	West Midlands Railway; Cross-City Line	Five Ways
Duddeston	West Midlands Railway; Walsall – Aston – Birmingham – Wolverhampton	Smethwick Rolfe Street
Birmingham International or Adderley Park	West Midlands Railway; Birmingham – Walsall – Rugeley	Tame Bridge Parkway
Adderley Park	West Midlands Railway; Birmingham International – Birmingham New Street	Terminus
Birmingham International	London Northwestern Railway; London Euston – Birmingham New Street	Terminus
Terminus	London Northwestern Railway; Birmingham New Street – Liverpool Lime Street	Smethwick Galton Bridge or Coseley
Birmingham International	Avanti West Coast; London – Birmingham – North West & Scotland; London – Shrewsbury	Terminus, Sandwell & Dudley or Wolverhampton
	Historical railways	
Duddeston	London and North Western Railway; Stour Valley Line	Monument Lane
Adderley Park	London and North Western Railway; Rugby–Birmingham–Stafford line	Monument Lane
Saltley	London and North Western Railway; Birmingham–Peterborough line	Terminus
Terminus	Midland Railway; Birmingham West Suburban Railway	Five Ways
Camp Hill	Midland Railway; Camp Hill line	Terminus

== Onward transport links ==
=== West Midlands Metro ===
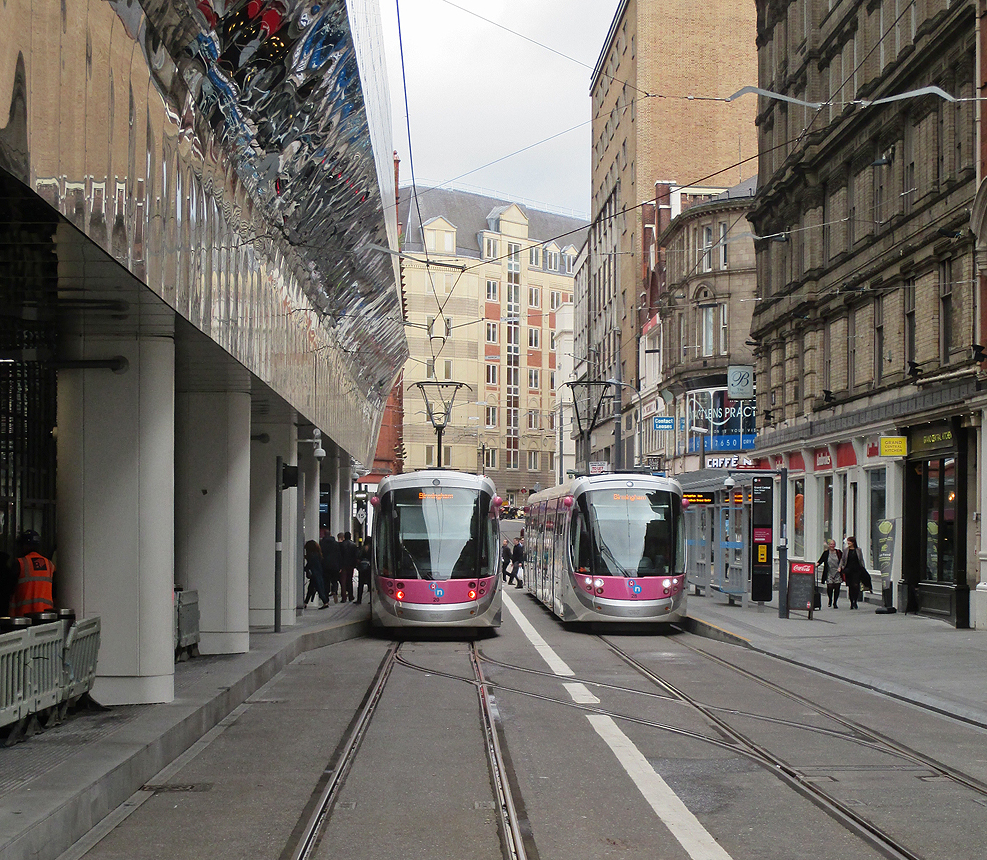
Two CAF Urbos 3 trams at Grand Central tram stop

New Street is served by the West Midlands Metro tram system from the adjacent Grand Central tram stop, located outside the main entrance on Stephenson Street. This opened on 30 May 2016, when the city centre extension of the Metro came into operation. The stop was temporarily, before extension to Broad Street, a terminus of West Midlands Metro Line One, and provides a link to Snow Hill station and onwards to Wolverhampton.

Initially, Grand Central was planned to act as the terminus of the city centre extension. However, it was later decided that further extension would take place towards Centenary Square and later to Edgbaston, this extension opened in mid 2022.

=== Links to Moor Street and Snow Hill stations ===
New Street station is 660 yards (600 m) away from Birmingham Moor Street; the city's second busiest railway station. There is a signposted route for passengers travelling between New Street and Moor Street stations which involves a short walk through a bus tunnel under the Bullring shopping centre. Although the railway lines into New Street pass directly underneath Moor Street station, there is no rail connection. In 2013 a new direct walkway was opened between the two stations. Birmingham Snow Hill station is 1,100 yards (1,000 m) away; it is either a ten-minute walk away to the north, or can be reached via a short tram ride on the West Midlands Metro.

== Accidents and incidents ==
- On 7 November 1850, the engine of a goods train which was leaving the station was derailed by an explosion caused by leaking gas from a gas-lighting main, which came into contact with its firebox. There were no casualties, but the abutment of the viaduct on which the explosion occurred was destroyed by the blast.
- On 18 April 1877, the south tunnel was blocked by an overturned locomotive.
- On 26 November 1921, a serious accident occurred on the Midland half of New Street station, when an express from Bristol crashed into the rear of a stationary train to Derby, which was standing at platform four and had been delayed due to engine trouble. The collision caused the guards van of the Derby train to telescope with the rear coach. Three people were killed, and twenty four injured. The later inquest ruled that the express had overrun the danger signal due to driver error, and the misty conditions had made the rails moist, leading to wheelslip when the driver applied the brakes.

== See also ==
- Transport in Birmingham
- Transport for West Midlands
- Commuter rail in the United Kingdom
