= Mary Mitchell (landscape architect) =

British landscape architect

Mary Frances Mitchell
- Born: 21 August 1923; Downton
- Died: 1988 (aged 64–65)
- Occupation: Landscape architect

Mary Frances Mitchell (21 August 1923 – 1988) was a British landscape architect.

== Life ==
Mitchell was born in Downton in Wiltshire, 1923. Her parents were Nancy (born Salter) and Albert Edwin Mitchell. Her father was a farmer, and she enjoyed being outdoors. She attended Clifton High School for Girls in Bristol.

She worked in South Africa after the war, and she returned to the UK in the 1950s, where she was employed by Birmingham's City Architect's office. In 1959-60 she was involved in planning the landscape of new land acquired by Birmingham University at the Vale in Edgbaston. The brief was to preserve the "green and gracious appearance of this part of Birmingham" whilst building several halls of residence that would be separated on the 45-acre site. Mitchell organised quite extensive landscaping for the project, and the site is listed. The overall design of the site was said to influence later similar developments at York University and the University of East Anglia.

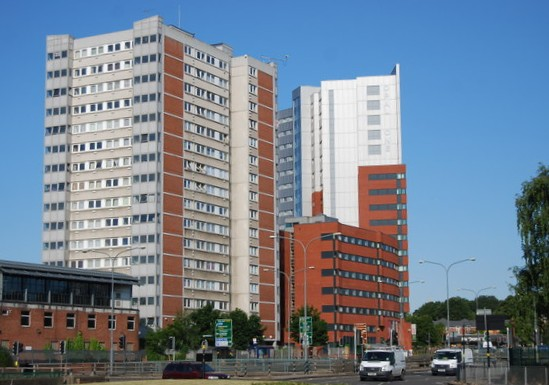
Tower block, Lee Bank Middleway

The Lee Bank area was designed in 1960 as a single unit by Birmingham's City Architect A.G. Sheppard Fidler. These consisted of 6-8 storey, brick built structures, however, when landscape architect Mitchell was appointed to help in the design, taller twenty storey tower blocks were introduced. The Lee Bank project was approved in stages between 1963 and 1967. It consisted of four 20 storey tower blocks, containing 464 flats, and one twelve storey tower block.

Mitchell became a fellow of the Institute of Landscape Architects in 1963. She established her own business and undertook work in the UK, Asia and the Middle East.

Mitchell was also a pioneering playground designer and was inspired by adventure playground advocate Marjory Allen.

Mitchell and Sylvia Crowe published in The Pattern of Landscape in 1988 and died in the same year.

== Written work ==
- The Pattern of Landscape. Chichester: Packard Publishing, 1988 (with Sylvia Crowe)
