= Sylvia Crowe =

British landscape architect and garden designer

Dame Sylvia Crowe

Dame Sylvia Crowe, DBE (15 September 1901 – 30 June 1997) was an English landscape architect and garden designer.

== Biography ==
Crowe was born in Banbury, Oxfordshire, the daughter of Beatrice (née Stockton) and Eyre Crowe, a cabinet manufacturer. Her father retired early due to ill health and moved the family to Felbridge, Sussex, to work as fruit farmer. Crowe attended Berkhamsted Girls' School, Hertfordshire from 1908 to 1912, and as a result of her suffering from tuberculosis she was also home schooled on the family farm. She trained under Madeline Agar at Swanley Horticultural College (later absorbed into Hadlow College, which continues to teach University of Greenwich courses in garden design).

After college, Crowe served an apprenticeship with Edward White at the Milner, Son & White company and then worked as a garden and landscape designer for 14 years. In July 1939 she was elected to the Council of the Institute of Landscape Architects, later the Landscape Institute. During the Second World War, Crowe served in France as an ambulance driver with the Polish Army.

After the War, Crowe served as President of the Institute of Landscape Architects from 1957 to 1959 and made important contributions to landscape planning for new towns, roads and forestry. Among her notable projects is the roof garden for the Scottish Widows building in Edinburgh, created using native Scottish plants.

In relation to the New Towns, she worked on Harlow between 1948 and 1958, followed by Basildon between 1949 and 1962. She also developed landscape plans for Washington and Hemel Hempstead. Her first book, "Tomorrow's Landscape" would seem to be a direct reference to Ebenezer Howard's vision for Garden Cities "Tomorrow: A Peaceful Path to Real Reform".

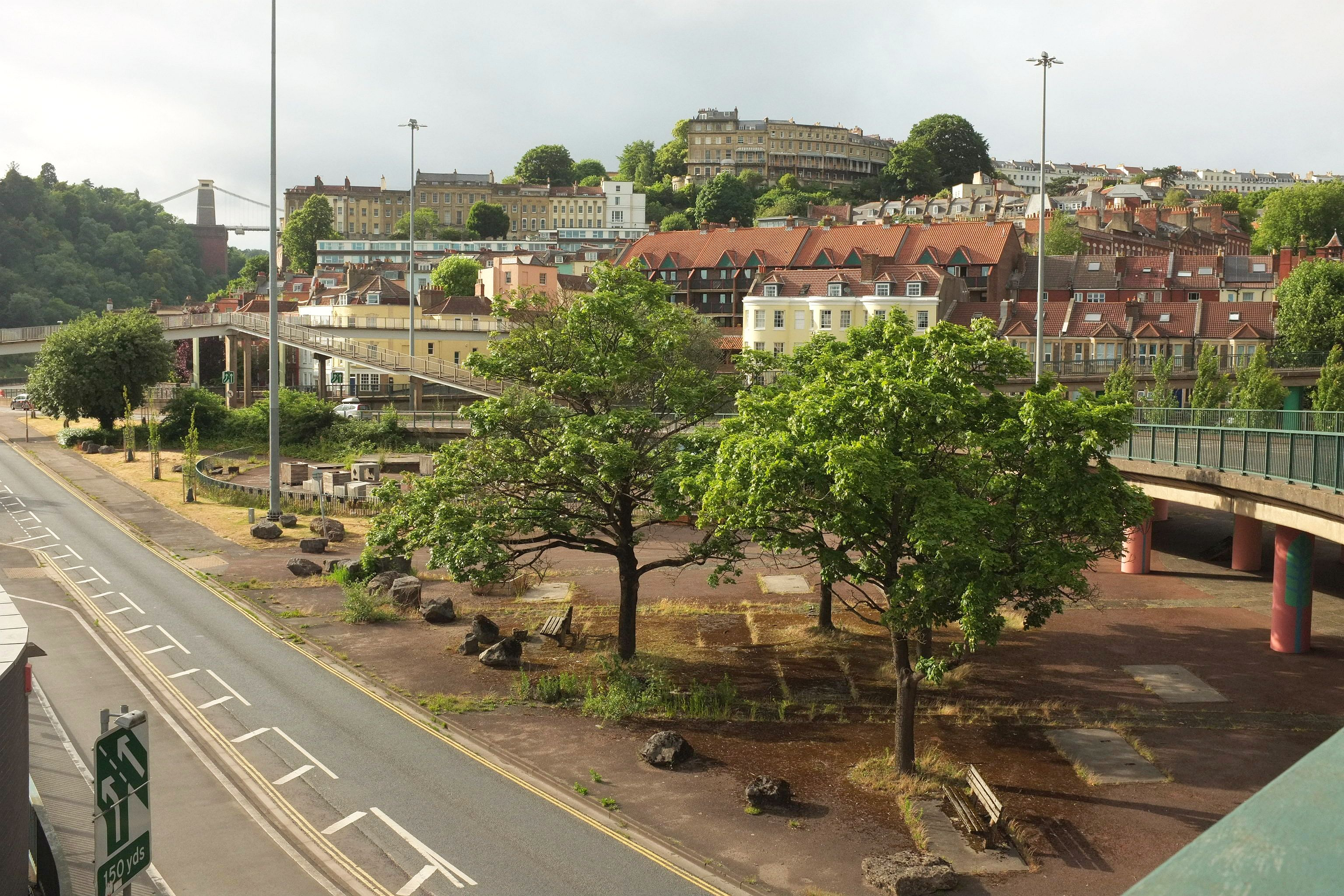
Cumberland Piazza in Bristol designed by Crowe in 1964

In 1964 she designed a piazza near the Cumberland bridge flyover in Bristol. The area had got run down but in 2011 the area was refreshed and the original plants were still there. In the 1960s, Crowe shared an office with Brenda Colvin, also president of the ILA. In 1964 Crowe prepared a landscape masterplan for Commonwealth Park in Canberra, Australia.

In 1969, landscape architect Kenneth Booth designed the cooling towers for Ironbridge B power station and was heavily influenced by the advice set out in Crowe's The Landscape of Power (1958).

In the mid-20th century Lower Soughton Hall at Northop in Flintshire belonged to the Gray family. In 1972, Stephen Alexander Reith Gray was Flintshire High Sheriff and Chief Executive of Shotton Steelworks. He commissioned Crowe and Raymond Cutbush to redesign the gardens and they remain much as they look today, with formal and informal features which includes herbaceous borders, yew hedges and island beds with mixed planting.

Crowe received an Honorary Doctorate from Heriot-Watt University in 1977.

Crowe died at St Mary's Hospital, London on 30 June 1997 of bronchopneumonia, aged 95. She never married.

== Awards ==
- CBE 1967; DBE 1973
- Associate Institute of Landscape Architects (ILA) 1934; Fellow ILA 1945
- Honorary Secretary of International Federation of Landscape Architecture (IFLA) 1949-54; Vice President IFLA 1954, 1962, 1964-1969; General Secretary IFLA 1956-59; Co-opted member of Council 1960-61
- President ILA 1957-59; Corresponding member of American Society of Landscape Architects (ASLA) 1960; Acting President IFLA 1970; Chairman of Tree Council 1974-76
- Hon FRIBA 1969; Hon FRTPI 1970; Hon DLitt, Newcastle 1976; Hon DLitt, Heriot-Watt 1976; Hon LLD, Sussex 1978; Hon Fellow Australian Institute of Landscape Architects 1978; Hon Fellow Institute of Chartered Foresters 1984; LI Gold Medal 1986; American Society of Landscape Architects Medal 1988; RHS Victoria Medal of Honour 1990; Australian Institute of Landscape Architects Gold Medal 1990
- ‘Woman of the year’ AJ 1960

== Written work ==
- Tomorrow’s Landscape. London: Architectural Press, 1956
- Garden Design. London: Country Life, 1956
- The Landscape of Power. London: Architectural Press, 1958
- The Landscape of Roads. London: Architectural Press, 1960
- Space for Living: Landscape Architecture and the Allied Professions (ed.) Amsterdam: Djambatan, 1961
- Shaping Tomorrow’s Landscape. Amsterdam: Djambatan, 1964
- Forestry in the Landscape. London: HMSO, 1966 (With Zvi Miller)
- Landscape Planning: A Policy for an Overcrowded World. Morges, Switzerland: IUCN, 1969
- The Landscape of Reservoirs. London: Association of River Authorities, 1969
- The Gardens of Mughul India a History and Guide. London, Thames and Hudson, 1972 (with Sheila Haywood, Susan Jellicoe and Gordon Patterson)
- The Pattern of Landscape. Chichester: Packard Publishing, 1988 (with Mary Mitchell)

== List of Garden Works ==
- Gardens at Lexham Hall, East Lexham, Norfolk
- Garden at Whalebones, Chipping_Barnet
