= Walter Herbert Allcott =

English painter (1889–1951)

Walter Herbert Allcott (1889-1951) was a British artist born in Ladywood in Birmingham. He trained at the Birmingham School of Art from 1897 to 1901. While he began painting oil portraits, he later worked primarily in watercolour and pastel, depicting landscapes and architectural subjects.

He moved to Chipping Camden in Gloucestershire in 1919. In 1920 he became member of the Royal Watercolour Society. In 1921, William John Wainwright, a prominent member of the Royal Birmingham Society of Artists, proposed that he become a member. There, over the period between 1899 and 1939 he exhibited over 200 works.

He travelled widely, frequently travelling to Italy in the 1920s and therefore his subjects are from all over Europe.
