= Adderley Park railway station =

Railway station in Birmingham, England

Adderley Park
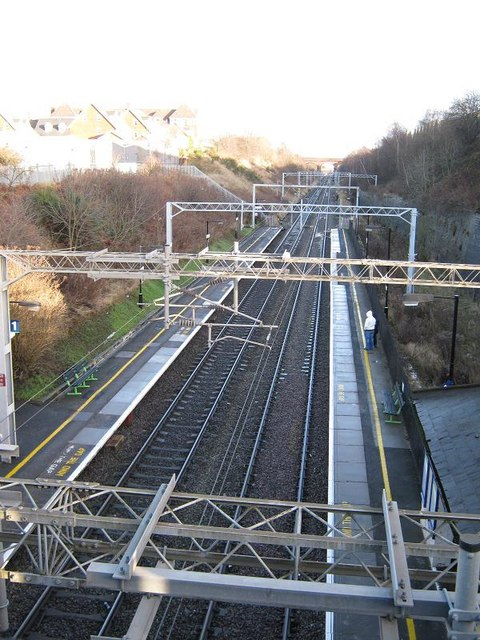

General information
- Location: Adderley Park, Birmingham; England
- Coordinates: 52.483°N 1.855°W
- Grid reference: SP098872
- Manager: West Midlands Railway
- Transit authority: Transport for West Midlands
- Platforms: 2

Other information
- Station code: ADD
- Fare zone: 2
- Classification: DfT category E

History
- Opened: 1 August 1860

Passengers
- 2021/22: ▲74,256
- 2022/23: ▲0.120 million
- 2023/24: ▲0.138 million
- 2024/25: ▲0.147 million
- 2025/26: ▼0.142 million
Location
Notes
- Passenger statistics from the Office of Rail and Road

Adderley Park railway station serves the Adderley Park area in the east of Birmingham, England. The station, and all trains serving it, are operated by West Midlands Trains. It was threatened with closure in 2004, but was given a reprieve (although its train service was reduced from half-hourly to hourly each way). The station will become the main railway station for the proposed City of Birmingham Stadium, if that is constructed.

It lies on Bordesley Green Road, part of the B4145.

== History ==
Opened by the London and North Western Railway, it became part of the London, Midland and Scottish Railway following the Grouping of 1923. The line passed to the London Midland Region of British Railways on nationalisation in 1948.

When Sectorisation was introduced, the station was served by Regional Railways on behalf of the West Midlands Passenger Transport Executive, for whom British Rail had been running the trains since the PTE's inception. Services on the Intercity Sector would frequently pass through on the West Coast Main Line as these services, run by the current operator, continue to do.

== Facilities ==
The station has a ticket office located at the entrance to platform 1 off Bordesley Green Road which is open Tuesday-Thursday 07:00-12:00, Friday 07:00-10:00, Saturday 12:00-14:00 and Sunday 09:00-14:00. When the ticket office is open tickets must be purchased before boarding the train. Outside of these times there is a ticket machine outside the ticket office which accepts card payments only - cash and voucher payments can be made to the senior conductor on the train.

Cycle parking is available.

There is no step free access to either platforms. The nearest stations with full step free access are Duddeston, Birmingham New Street and Stechford.

London Midland proposed the closure of the ticket office. The request was denied.

== Passenger volume ==
Passenger Volume at Adderley Park
	2019-20	2020-21	2021-22	2022-23
Entries and exits	114,200	42,226	74,256	120,046

== Services ==
Adderley Park is served by one train per hour, to Birmingham New Street westbound where one train extends to Rugeley Trent Valley and to Birmingham International eastbound. A limited service operates beyond Birmingham International towards Coventry and Northampton mainly at peak times and the start/end of service.

On Sundays, there is an hourly service westbound to Birmingham New Street and eastbound to Birmingham International with most services extending to Rugby and Northampton.

All services are operated by West Midlands Trains. Most services operate under the West Midlands Railway brand but some services (those which start/terminate at Rugby or Northampton) operate under the London Northwestern Railway brand.

Preceding station	National Rail	Following station
Birmingham New Street	West Midlands Railway; Rugeley Trent Valley/Birmingham New Street-Birmingham International	Stechford
Birmingham New Street Terminus	London Northwestern Railway London–Birmingham	Stechford towards London Euston
