= Alwyn Sheppard Fidler =

British architect (1909–1990)

Alwyn Sheppard Fidler CBE
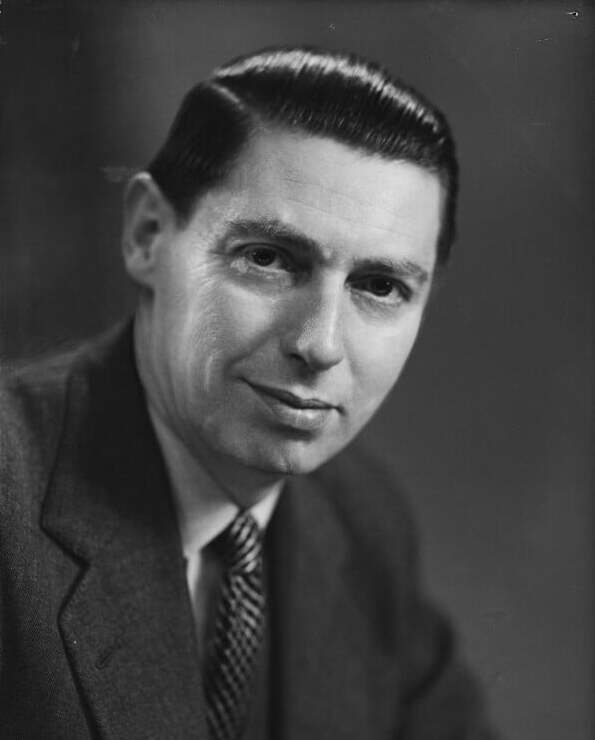
- Fidler in 1952
- Born: 8 May 1909; Holywell, Flintshire
- Died: 4 January 1990 (aged 80)
- Education: University of Liverpool
- Engineering career
- Practice name: City Architect of Birmingham
- Projects: Crawley

Alwyn Gwilym Sheppard Fidler CBE (8 May 1909 – 1990) was a Welsh architect and town planner who was chief architect for the new town of Crawley from 1947 to 1952 and was the first person to be appointed City Architect of Birmingham, where he remained from 1952 to 1964.

== Life ==
Alwyn Gwilym Sheppard Fidler was born in Holywell, Flintshire on 8 May 1909. His father, William Ernest Fidler was a schoolteacher and his mother was Phoebe Maud, née Williams. He attended Holywell grammar school as a child. In 1927 he studied architecture under Charles Reilly and Patrick Abercrombie at the University of Liverpool. He won an award and travelled to the British School at Rome in 1933.

Fidler married Margaret Isabella Kidner on 1 January 1936 at St Bride’s Parish Church, Liverpool. They had a son together. Fidler was appointed a Commander of the Order of the British Empire (CBE) in 1963. He died on 4 January 1990 of a cardiovascular disease.

== Career ==
By 1937, Fidler had become chief architect to the Land Settlement Association, supported by the Carnegie Trust, designed to resettle the workers who had become unemployed when industry had taken a downturn. The following year he moved to be chief architect for Barclay's Bank.

After the outbreak of World War II, Fidler joined Ministry of Home Security, where he served as a senior technical intelligence officer. He remained with the ministry until 1946. After leaving he became the chief architect for Crawley New Town.

In 1952, Fidler became the first City Architect of Birmingham, where he remained until 1964. He then set up his own practice, where he remained until 1974.

== Sources ==
- Gold, John R. The practice of modernism: modern architects and urban transformation, 1954–1972. Routledge, (2007). p. 1958
- Campbell, Louise. "A Call to Order: The Rome Prize and Early Twentieth-Century British Architecture." Architectural History 32 (1989): 131-151.
