= Park Central, Birmingham =

Coordinates: 52.471220°N 1.907789°W

Park Central: Park Central
- Location within the West Midlands
- OS grid reference: SP0626385965
- Metropolitan borough: City of Birmingham
- Metropolitan county: West Midlands
- Region: West Midlands
- Country: England
- Sovereign state: United Kingdom
- Post town: BIRMINGHAM
- Postcode district: B1,B15
- Dialling code: 0121
- Police: West Midlands
- Fire: West Midlands
- Ambulance: West Midlands
- UK Parliament: Birmingham Ladywood

Park Central is a residential district situated in the south western area of Birmingham city centre (also known as Central Birmingham).

The area is formally known as Lee Bank, on which Park Central is located, had become run down over time and required redevelopment. As a result, Crest Nicholson decided to develop the area with new mid and high rise properties. Numerous 1960s residential buildings were demolished, including Haddon Tower which was destroyed on 23 July 2006. Construction began in late 2005 with the leveling of the land and, as of June 2016, 1,309 homes have been built and the construction of the final phase (known as the Lexington Quarter and consisting of 339 further units) is underway.

Park Central contains a mixture of houses and apartments, two parks; Sunset and Moonlit park designed by Crest Nicholson and their architects.
