= City Architect of Birmingham =

Position of Birmingham City Council

The City Architect of Birmingham was a high-ranking position within the Public Works department of Birmingham City Council. It provided the holder with a lot of power in the planning decisions of Birmingham, especially in the post-war period, wherein Birmingham underwent enormous regeneration. Combined with the City Engineer position, which was held by Sir Herbert Manzoni, the City Architect designed or had an important say in all city council building projects.

The position was created in the 1950s by the Public Works department to assist in the design and construction of large building projects prompted by the demands of the growing population and by the vast amounts of money being invested in regenerating areas that had been devastated by the Luftwaffe in the Birmingham Blitz. In the 1950s, Birmingham suffered from a housing shortage for approximately 65,000 families, and the council's initial decision was to construct temporary prefabricated homes. However, as demand for longer-lasting flats grew, the council decided that these were necessary and that the five redevelopment areas, designated by Manzoni, were the foci for modern housing provision.

== 1952–63: Alwyn Sheppard Fidler ==
The first architect to be given the position of City Architect of Birmingham was Alwyn Sheppard Fidler, who moved from the chief architect for the new town of Crawley in 1952. In 1954, Fidler established his own Architect's Department as the workload increased. His initial commissions were small-scale projects such as the former Register Office on Broad Street, although he was allowed to exhibit his preference towards mixed-use provision – usually a combination of residential properties and retail units. He also advocated the approach by the council towards high-density housing. In his first few years of being City Architect, Fidler witnessed the construction of many five and six-story residential schemes designed by Manzoni, such as the Marston Green estate. Fidler expressed his distaste towards the designs of these estates, calling Manzoni's designs 'mud pies'. When Fidler created the Architect's Department, he was able to impose three policies that would change the quality of housing design. Firstly, he ensured that he was responsible for all the housing projects that were being built by national contractors such as Wimpey that the city council was working with. Secondly, he ended the construction of Manzoni's six-storey blocks and replaced them with schemes that were more specific to the individual site and reflected the need for the type of housing in the area. Finally, he called for the appointment of a landscape architect to improve the layout of a large housing estate, a policy that surprised many Birmingham councilors. These policies did take time to come into effect, as many of his designs were still affected by external forces and practices. Under Manzoni, the designs for housing blocks had been negotiated with the contractors to bring down construction costs and times. But the formation of his department that gave him independence from Manzoni made it easier for Fidler to have a free hand in design.

The change in the quality of design was almost immediate, with Fidler's designs for suburban flats in Rubery and the Hankley Farm estate being selected for an exhibition at the Royal Academy and also being published by the Review in 1954 for its annual Preview. The designs consisted of six storey blocks built of load-bearing brickwork. The brickwork was used for both the exterior and the thin infill walls. The first tower blocks to be constructed by the council were the construction of four tower blocks in Duddeston. Collectively known as the Duddeston Four, the 12-storey High, Queens, Home and South Towers, were all completed between 1954 and 1955 to a design by S. N. Cooke and Partners. The design was expensive and upon their completion, they were criticised by the council over their cost, despite receiving positive reviews from the Municipal Journal and Architectural Review. These would be the last privately designed high-density residential properties constructed by the council.

As well as designing residential schemes, Fidler also collaborated with private architect's firms to produce designs for schemes such as Hall Green Technology College, designed in association with S. T. Walker and Partners and completed in 1958. The use of reinforced concrete, cedar boards and aluminium frames for windows and the lack of brickwork showed how much influence S. T. Walker and Partners had on the design. Another educational building designed by Fidler was Ladywood County Primary School in 1961. Part of the City Architect's work involved conservation and repairing buildings that had been damaged in World War II. An example of this is the reconstructed Edmund Street elevation above the entrance to Birmingham Museum & Art Gallery in 1958. A project that Fidler became involved with was the Civic Centre scheme, which had started just before World War II and resulted in the partially completed Baskerville House. In 1958, he produced a less formal layout with four residential tower blocks linked to municipal offices on their north side. Whilst this was never constructed in his time as City Architect, it was generally approved and modified by the successor to Fidler.

At the turn of the 1960s, the council began to propose and construct larger and more dramatic schemes. Manzoni's lack of experience in high-rise schemes led to Fidler being commissioned to design these more ambitious schemes. The Lyndhurst estate in Erdington was completed in 1960 to a design by Fidler and featured five tower blocks, including Harlech Tower which was the tallest tower block in the city upon completion. In the following year, the entire estate won a Civic Design Award reflecting the quality of the design and the use of materials. Whilst there had been opposition towards the demolition of the upmarket Victorian villas that were demolished to allow for the construction of the estate, much praise was given towards the masterplan which incorporated the existing mature trees. However, the council's increasing demand for more housing estates led to a lesser focus on the quality of design. Fidler was a supporter of a phased approach to development, unlike the council who wanted schemes to be built all at once. In 1962, at a time when more homes were being demolished than being constructed by the council, Fidler urged the council to adopt the French Camus system which consisted of housing at a density of approximately 50 houses per hectare and 80 people per acre. The council refused this and demanded 48 homes per hectare with 75 people per acre. In 1963, following the rejection of his plan for a 'garden city' for the Castle Vale estate, Fidler resigned from his position. One of his final works was the expansion of the College of Advanced Technology (now Aston University) which was carried out in phases between 1957 and 1965. He was quickly succeeded by J. R. Sheridan-Shedden, the deputy City Architect who held the position temporarily. Upon taking the position, he designed a revised masterplan for the Castle Vale estate. The new masterplan used the Radburn Layout which consisted of super-blocks of housing, schools, retail and offices around a communal open space, a concept which was created by Clarence Stein in Radburn, New Jersey in 1929.

The council attempted to limit the damage caused to their reputation as a result of the scandal surrounding the resignation of Fidler by embarking on a major building project at Castle Vale with five new goals. They increased housing output at the estate by an extra 4,000 homes, aimed to reduce the cost of dwellings, introducing industrialised forms of construction to save labour, attracting new national contractors to work in Birmingham, and increasing capacity by providing continuous work for contractors. Between 1968 and 1969, 30,000 had been constructed on the estate and the council boasted a 'world record'. Despite the vast increase in housing output since Fidler, the quality of design had deteriorated. Reinforced concrete became the main material used due to its low cost and ease of use. Following Fidler's departure, the council removed some of the power that the City Architect had in housing decisions. They also sought a new architect who shared their attitude towards construction.

== 1966–73: Alan Maudsley ==
The council gained a reputation for large ambitious schemes as a result of the Castle Vale estate. The council even extended out of its own boundaries to take over and construct the 1,500-acre (6.1 km^{2}) Water Orton estate, which is now known as Chelmsley Wood. Alan Maudsley was a supporter of the council's plans for Castle Vale and introduced Bryants, a contractor, to the council and a relationship between the two ensued. Bryant was intent on creating a brand image through the construction of homes for councils, and Birmingham City Council gave them this opportunity. Due to the reduced powers the city architect had over housing design, Bryant had an influential say in housing designs. They won two-thirds of high-rise housing contracts in the city, mainly due to their use of the Bison design system. One of their largest contracts was for the Druids Heath estate in the south of Birmingham which the company boasted would be "the largest industrialised building project in Britain". The main reason for Bryants' success in Birmingham was their adoption of the Bison method of industrialised system building.

The relationship between the council and Bryants was aided by an ex-Birmingham councillor and West Midlands MP who handled the firm's publicity. His influence in the company assisted them in awarding contracts in other Labour-controlled areas in the Black Country. To aid their position in securing contracts in Birmingham and the Black Country, Bryants gave gifts to senior members of the councils. The process of awarding contracts became less and less transparent. However, in November 1973, Alan Maudsley along with private architects John Sharp and Evan Ebery were arrested and charged with corruption relating to the awarding of contracts to Bryants. The two private architects were also arrested for corruptly conspiring to give money towards paying transport costs, hotel bills and the provision of a London flat for Maudsley. Alan Maudsley pleaded guilty to entering a corrupt relationship with Sharp and Ebery at Birmingham Crown Court in 1975. In 1977, four Bryants directors were found guilty on numerous counts of giving gifts to councillors. In 1978, Christoper Bryant, the owner of Bryants, went on trial at the Old Bailey denying two counts of plotting to bribe Maudsley.

Despite this, Maudsley did produce some designs for the city council. His focus was more towards public facilities, in a period when housing output was reaching its peak in Birmingham. Examples of facilities he designed or assisted in the design of include the Cannon Hill Park Boat House in 1967, which was designed in association with Edward L. Preston. The same two architects worked together to design the Perry Barr Refuse Disposal Works in 1969, although the design was changed significantly, including the removal of a 300-foot (91 m) tall chimney. Although the design for Birmingham Central Library is largely accredited to John Madin, a prolific local architect, Alan Maudsley played a vital part in the design of the building. His changes to the original design by Madin to reduce costs are said to be the main causes for the problems that the structure experienced, for example the decision to construct it out of pre-cast concrete panels as opposed to Travertine marble which had been suggested by Madin. Conservation projects were also part of Maudsley's work load and in 1969 he designed the renovation of the Kingston Row terraced houses which date back to 1780. Maudsley still assisted in the design of major housing projects, such as Bromford Bridge in the Bromford area of Erdington. The housing estate housed approximately 6,000 people when opened in 1968 with numerous high-rise tower blocks and low-rise blocks set alongside the M6 motorway. Maudsley also designed and masterplanned an estate of 64 single storey houses on Kingstanding Beacon in the Kingstanding area.

== W.G. Reed – the last City Architect ==
While Maudsley was being prosecuted, his deputy William G. Reed fulfilled the role of City Architect, and following Maudsley's conviction he was appointed City Architect. The quantity surveying division was separated into the new City Building Finance Department.

Reed sought to improve both the quality of architectural design, and the methods of managing the department. The post of Deputy was abolished and four Assistant City Architects each headed major areas of work: Housing; Education and Social Services. He appointed Granville Lewis, formerly at Coventry City Council, as Assistant City Architect responsible for a new wave of social housing estates on the City's Worcestershire border. Reed also appointed a number of new generation architects to introduce fresh design ideas. The resulting North Worcestershire estates broke new ground in layout and dwelling design being more open and attractive than their predecessors.

In the early 1970s a backlash developed to post-war wholesale slum clearance. It became recognised that dwellings scheduled for clearance could be refurbished to provide decent homes. Birmingham, at the forefront of this new thinking, established an Urban Renewal section in the Environmental Health Department. This is based on 8 multi-disciplinary project teams around the city working with residents on the improvement of their neighbourhoods. In a far-sighted and progressive move, Reed established a project team of architects in each team with a dedicated central group of architectural staff under architect Ken Gething, who had joined the Department following the merger of Sutton Coldfield into Birmingham. Reed also appointed a project planner to assist in clarifying the sequence and timescale of the work. The result was a major contribution to Birmingham’s national pre-eminence in the urban renewal field.

Meanwhile, the programme of new social housing that had been the core of the department’s role was reducing year by year, and Reed was faced with the delicate task of reducing the size of the department and adapting it to a different mix of work, and this remained a constant challenge throughout his tenure.

A further challenge arose when the Chief Executive, Tom Caulcott, launched a consultant’s review of the department to establish its viability and benefit to the city. After an intensive investigation by Coopers & Lybrand, the conclusion was that the department, though capable of improvement, was indeed a viable operation. Reed had long supported the use of information technology and one outcome of the investigation, together with the emergence of affordable mini and PCs, was the introduction of better project financial systems and the progressive roll-out of computer-aided design.

Throughout, Reed’s dedication to design and designers never wavered and led to a National RIBA Architecture Award in 1987 for social housing in Belgrave Middleway, and RIBA President’s Building of the Year in 1989 for Nelson Mandela School, both by Reed appointee Will Howland. Reed had to manage the process of selecting the architects for the Birmingham International Convention Centre and Symphony Hall, requiring great tact in balancing the competing interests of local, national, and international companies.

In the 1990 New Year's Honours list Reed was appointed CBE for architecture services.

In 1991, the Departments of Planning and Architecture were merged and Les Sparks formerly Director of Planning at Bath headed the new organisation, with Reed as Associate Director of Planning and Architecture. The following year, he retired, and the title City Architect was discontinued

== Heads of Architecture ==
The role of City Architect was jointly fulfilled by Pat Eve, formerly the Practice Architect and Ken Gething. Following the merger of the building structural and M&E engineering functions, the combination became Birmingham Design Services. When Eve and Gething retired, Will Howland headed the organisation until 1997, and Trevor Skempton was then appointed, leaving in 2000.

A further merger subsequently took place with the council’s building maintenance division, and the once prestigious and influential department effectively ceased to exist.

== See also ==
- Architecture of Birmingham
