= List of schools in Birmingham =

This is a list of schools in Birmingham, West Midlands, England.

== State-funded schools ==
=== Primary schools ===
- Abbey RC Primary School, Erdington
- Acocks Green Primary School, Acocks Green
- Adderley Primary School, Adderley Park
- Al-Furqan Primary School, Tyseley
- Albert Bradbeer Primary Academy, Northfield
- Allens Croft Primary School, Kings Heath
- Alston Primary School, Bordesley Green
- Anderton Park Primary School, Sparkhill
- Anglesey Primary School, Lozells
- Arden Primary School, Sparkhill
- Ark Kings Academy, Kings Norton
- Ark Tindal Primary Academy, Balsall Heath
- Ark Victoria Academy, Small Heath
- Aston Tower Community Primary School, Aston
- Audley Primary School, Stechford
- Barford Primary School, Edgbaston
- Barr View Primary Academy, Great Barr
- Beeches Primary School, Perry Beeches
- Bellfield Infant School, Northfield
- Bellfield Junior School, Northfield
- Bells Farm Primary School, Druids Heath
- Benson Community School, Hockley
- Billesley Primary School, Billesley
- Birches Green Primary School, Erdington
- Birchfield Primary School, Aston
- Blakesley Hall Primary School, Yardley
- Boldmere Infant School, Boldmere
- Boldmere Junior School, Boldmere
- Bordesley Green Primary School, Bordesley Green
- Bordesley Village Primary School, Bordesley
- Bournville School, Bournville
- Bournville Village Primary, Bournville
- Broadmeadow Infant School, Kings Norton
- Broadmeadow Junior School, Kings Norton
- Brookfields Primary School, Hockley
- Brookvale Primary School, Stockland Green
- Brownmead Primary Academy, Shard End
- Calshot Primary School, Great Barr
- Canterbury Cross Primary School, Birchfield
- Cedars Academy, Acocks Green
- Chad Vale Primary School, Edgbaston
- Chandos Primary School, Highgate
- Cherry Orchard Primary School, Handsworth Wood
- Chilcote Primary School, Hall Green
- Chilwell Croft Academy, Newtown
- Chivenor Primary School, Castle Vale
- Christ Church CE Primary School, Sparkbrook
- Christ the King RC Primary School, Kingstanding
- City Road Primary School, Rotton Park
- Clifton Primary School, Balsall Heath
- Cofton Primary School, West Heath
- Colebourne Primary School, Hodge Hill
- Colmers Farm Primary School, Longbridge
- Colmore Infant School, Kings Heath
- Colmore Junior School, Kings Heath
- Conway Primary School, Sparkbrook
- Coppice Primary School, Four Oaks
- Corpus Christi RC Primary School, Stechford
- Cotteridge Primary School, Cotteridge
- Cottesbrooke Infant School, Acocks Green
- Court Farm Primary School, Erdington
- Cromwell Junior & Infant School, Nechells
- The Deanery CE Primary School, Walmley
- Deykin Avenue Junior & Infant School, Witton
- Dorrington Academy, Perry Barr
- Elms Farm Community Primary School, Sheldon
- English Martyrs' RC Primary School, Springfield
- Erdington Hall Primary School, Erdington
- Fairway Primary Academy, Kings Norton
- Featherstone Primary School, Erdington
- Firs Primary School, Castle Bromwich
- Forestdale Primary School, Frankley
- Four Dwellings Primary Academy, Quinton
- Four Oaks Primary School, Four Oaks
- George Dixon Primary School, Harborne
- Gilbertstone Primary School, Gilbertstone
- Glenmead Primary School, Oscott
- Gossey Lane Academy, Shard End
- Green Meadow Primary School, Weoley
- Greenholm Primary School, Oscott
- Greet Primary School, Greet
- Grendon Primary School, Kings Heath
- Grestone Academy, Handsworth Wood
- Grove School, Handsworth
- Guardian Angels RC Primary School, Shard End
- Gunter Primary School, Erdington
- Hall Green Infant School, Hall Green
- Hall Green Junior School, Hall Green
- Harborne Primary School, Harborne
- Harper Bell Seventh-day Adventist School, Camp Hill
- Hawkesley Church Primary Academy, Kings Norton
- Hawthorn Primary School, Kingstanding
- Heath Mount Primary School, Balsall Heath
- Heathfield Primary School, Handsworth
- Heathlands Primary Academy, Castle Bromwich
- Highfield Junior & Infant School, Saltley
- Highters Heath Community School, Warstock
- Hill West Primary School, Four Oaks
- Hillstone Primary School, Shard End
- Hodge Hill Primary School, Hodge Hill
- Holland House Infant School, Sutton Coldfield
- Holly Hill Methodist/CE Infant School, Rubery
- Hollyfield Primary School, Reddicap Heath
- Hollywood Primary School, Highter's Heath
- Holy Cross RC Primary School, Walmley
- Holy Family RC Primary School, Small Heath
- Holy Souls RC Primary School, Acocks Green
- Holy Trinity CE Primary Academy, Handsworth
- James Watt Primary School, Soho
- Jervoise School, Weoley Castle
- King David Primary School, Moseley
- King Solomon International Business School, Duddeston
- Kings Heath Primary School, Kings Heath
- Kings Norton Junior & Infant School, Kings Norton
- Kings Rise Academy, Kingstanding
- Kingsland Primary School, Kingstanding
- Kingsthorne Primary School, Kingstanding
- Kitwell Primary School, Bartley Green
- Ladypool Primary School, Sparkbrook
- Lakey Lane Junior & Infant School, Acocks Green
- Lea Forest Primary Academy, Kitts Green
- Leigh Primary School, Washwood Heath
- Little Sutton Primary School, Sutton Coldfield
- Lozells Junior & Infant School, Aston
- Lyndon Green Infant School, Sheldon
- Lyndon Green Junior School, Sheldon
- Maney Hill Primary School, Maney
- Manor Park Primary Academy, Aston
- Mansfield Green E-ACT Academy, Aston
- Mapledene Primary School, Sheldon
- Marlborough Primary School, Small Heath
- Marsh Hill Primary School, Stockland Green
- Maryvale RC Primary School, Old Oscott
- The Meadows Primary School, Longbridge
- Mere Green Primary School, Mere Green
- Merritts Brook Primary E-ACT Academy, Weoley
- Minworth Junior & Infant School, Minworth
- Montgomery Primary Academy, Sparkbrook
- Moor Green Primary School, Moseley
- Moor Hall Primary School, Sutton Coldfield
- Moseley CE Primary School, Moseley
- Nansen Primary School, Washwood Heath
- Nechells Primary E-ACT Academy, Nechells
- Nelson Junior & Infant School, Ladywood
- Nelson Mandela School, Sparkbrook
- New Hall Primary School, Sutton Coldfield
- New Oscott Primary School, New Oscott
- Nishkam Primary School, Handsworth
- Nonsuch Primary School, Woodgate
- Northfield Manor Primary Academy, Selly Oak
- The Oaklands Primary School, Acocks Green
- The Oaks Primary School, Druids Heath
- Oasis Academy Blakenhale Infants, Garretts Green
- Oasis Academy Blakenhale Junior, Garretts Green
- Oasis Academy Boulton, Soho
- Oasis Academy Foundry, Soho
- Oasis Academy Hobmoor, Yardley
- Oasis Academy Short Heath, Short Heath
- Oasis Academy Woodview, Edgbaston
- The Olive School Birmingham, Sparkhill
- The Olive School Small Heath, Small Heath
- The Oratory RC Primary School, Ladywood
- The Orchards Primary Academy, Bartley Green
- Osborne Primary School, Erdington
- Our Lady & St Rose of Lima RC Primary School, Weoley
- Our Lady of Fatima RC Primary School, Quinton
- Our Lady of Lourdes RC Primary School, Yardley Wood
- Our Lady's RC Primary School, Tile Cross
- The Oval School, Yardley
- Paganel Primary School, Selly Oak
- Paget Primary School, Pype Hayes
- Park Hill Primary School, Moseley
- Parkfield Community School, Saltley
- Pegasus Primary Academy, Castle Vale
- Penns Primary School, Sutton Coldfield
- Percy Shurmer Academy, Balsall Heath
- Prince Albert Junior & Infant School, Aston
- Princethorpe Infant School, Weoley
- Princethorpe Junior School, Weoley
- Quinton Church Primary School, Quinton
- Raddlebarn Primary School, Selly Park
- Reaside Academy, Frankley
- Redhill Primary School, Hay Mills
- Rednal Hill Infant School, Rednal
- Rednal Hill Junior School, Rednal
- Regents Park Community Primary School, Nechells
- Robin Hood Academy, Hall Green
- Rookery School, Handsworth
- The Rosary RC Primary School, Saltley
- Sacred Heart RC Primary School, Birchfield
- St Alban's RC Primary School, Kings Heath
- St Ambrose Barlow RC Primary School, Hall Green
- St Anne's RC Primary School, Nechells
- St Augustine's RC Primary School, Handsworth
- St Barnabas CE Primary School, Erdington
- St Benedict's Primary School, Bordesley Green
- St Bernadette's RC Primary School, Yardley
- St Bernard's RC Primary School, Wake Green
- St Brigid's RC Primary School, Northfield
- St Catherine of Siena RC Primary School, Lee Bank
- St Chad's RC Primary School, Newtown
- St Clare's RC Primary School, Handsworth
- St Clement's CE Academy, Nechells
- St Columba's RC Primary School, Rednal
- St Cuthbert's RC Junior & Infant School, Stechford
- St Dunstan's RC Primary School, Kings Heath
- St Edward's RC Primary School, Selly Park
- St Francis CE Primary School, Bournville
- St Francis RC Primary School, Handsworth
- St George's CE Academy, Newtown
- St George's CE Primary School, Ladywood
- St Gerard's RC Junior & Infant School, Castle Vale
- St James CE Primary School, Handsworth
- St James RC Primary School, Rednal
- St John Fisher RC Primary School, West Heath
- St John's & St Peter's CE Academy, Ladywood
- St John's CE Primary School, Sparkhill
- St Joseph's RC Primary School, Kings Norton
- St Joseph's RC Primary School, Nechells
- St Joseph's RC Primary School, Sutton Coldfield
- St Jude's RC Primary School, Druids Heath
- St Laurence Church Infant School, Northfield
- St Laurence Church Junior School, Northfield
- St Margaret Mary RC Junior & Infant School, Perry Common
- St Mark's RC Primary School, Great Barr
- St Martin de Porres RC Primary School, Moseley
- St Mary & St John Junior & Infant School, Erdington
- St Mary's CE Primary Academy, Handsworth
- St Mary's CE Primary School, Selly Oak
- St Mary's RC Primary School, Harborne
- St Matthew's CE Primary School, Duddeston
- St Michael's CE Primary Academy, Handsworth
- St Michael's CE Primary School, Bartley Green
- St Nicholas RC Primary School, Sutton Coldfield
- St Patrick's St Edmund's RC Primary School, Ladywood
- St Paul's RC Primary School, Kings Norton
- St Peter & St Paul RC Junior & Infant School, Erdington
- St Peter's CE Primary School, Harborne
- St Peter's RC Primary School, Bartley Green
- St Saviour's CE Primary School, Saltley
- St Teresa's RC Primary School, Handsworth Wood
- St Thomas CE Academy, Lee Bank
- St Thomas More RC Primary School, Sheldon
- St Vincent's RC Primary School, Nechells
- St Wilfrid's RC Junior & Infant School, Castle Bromwich
- SS John and Monica RC Primary School, Moseley
- Severne Junior & Infant School, Acocks Green
- Shaw Hill Primary School, Alum Rock
- The Shirestone Academy, Tile Cross
- Slade Primary School, Erdington
- Sladefield Infant School, Ward End
- Somerville Primary School, Small Heath
- Springfield Primary Academy, Moseley
- Stanville Primary School, Sheldon
- Starbank School, Small Heath
- Stechford Primary School, Stechford
- Stirchley Primary School, Stirchley
- Story Wood School, Perry Common
- Summerfield Junior & Infant School, Winson Green
- Sundridge Primary School, Kingstanding
- Sutton Park Primary, Sutton Coldfield
- Tame Valley Academy, Castle Bromwich
- Thornton Primary School, Ward End
- Timberley Academy, Shard End
- Tiverton Academy, Bournbrook
- Topcliffe Primary School, Castle Vale
- Town Junior School, Sutton Coldfield
- Turves Green Primary School, Northfield
- Twickenham Primary School, Kingstanding
- Walmley Infant School, Walmley
- Walmley Junior School, Walmley
- Ward End Primary School, Ward End
- Warren Farm Primary School, Kingstanding
- Washwood Heath Academy, Washwood Heath
- Water Mill Primary School, Selly Oak
- Wattville Primary School, Handsworth
- Waverley School, Small Heath
- Welford Primary School, Handsworth
- Welsh House Farm Community School, Quinton
- West Heath Primary School, West Heath
- Westminster Primary School, Handsworth
- Wheelers Lane Primary School, Kings Heath
- Whitehouse Common Primary School, Whitehouse Common
- William Murdoch Primary School, Handsworth
- Woodcock Hill Primary School, Northfield
- Woodgate Primary School, Bartley Green
- Woodhouse Primary Academy, Quinton
- Woodthorpe Junior & Infant School, Kings Heath
- World's End Infant School, Quinton
- World's End Junior School, Quinton
- Wychall Primary School, Northfield
- Wylde Green Primary School, Wylde Green
- Wyndcliffe Primary School, Bordesley Green
- Yardley Primary School, Yardley
- Yardley Wood Community Primary School, Yardley Wood
- Yarnfield Primary School, Tyseley
- Yenton Primary School, Erdington
- Yew Tree Community Junior & Infant School, Aston
- Yorkmead Junior & Infant School, Hall Green

=== Non-selective secondary schools ===
- Archbishop Ilsley RC School, Acocks Green
- Arena Academy, Great Barr
- Ark Boulton Academy, Sparkhill
- Ark Kings Academy, Kings Norton
- Ark St Alban's Academy, Highgate
- Ark Victoria Academy, Small Heath
- The Arthur Terry School, Four Oaks, Sutton Coldfield
- Aston Manor Academy, Aston
- Aston University Engineering Academy, Gosta Green
- Bartley Green School, Bartley Green
- Birmingham Ormiston Academy, Birmingham City Centre
- Bishop Challoner RC College, Kings Heath
- Bishop Walsh RC School, Sutton Coldfield
- BOA Digital Technologies Academy, Nechells
- Bordesley Green Girls' School, Bordesley Green
- Bournville School, Bournville
- Broadway Academy, Perry Barr
- Cardinal Wiseman RC School, Kingstanding
- Christ Church - Church Of England Secondary Academy, Yardley Wood
- City Academy, Ladywood
- Cockshut Hill School, Yardley
- Colmers School, Rednal
- Dame Elizabeth Cadbury School, Bournville
- Eden Boys' Leadership Academy, Aston
- Eden Boys' School, Perry Barr
- Eden Girls' Leadership Academy, Balsall Heath
- Erdington Academy, Erdington
- Fairfax Academy, Sutton Coldfield
- Fortis Academy, Great Barr
- Four Dwellings Academy, Quinton
- George Dixon Academy, Harborne
- Greenwood Academy, Castle Vale
- Hall Green School, Hall Green
- Hamstead Hall Academy, Handsworth Wood
- Harborne Academy, Edgbaston
- Heartlands Academy, Nechells
- Hillcrest School, Bartley Green
- Hodge Hill College, Hodge Hill
- Hodge Hill Girls' School, Hodge Hill
- Holte School, Lozells
- Holy Trinity RC School, Small Heath
- Holyhead School, Handsworth
- Jewellery Quarter Academy, Birmingham City Centre
- John Willmott School, Sutton Coldfield
- King Edward VI Balaam Wood Academy, Frankley
- King Edward VI Handsworth Wood Girls' Academy, Handsworth Wood
- King Edward VI Northfield School for Girls, Northfield
- King Edward VI Sheldon Heath Academy, Sheldon
- King Solomon International Business School, Duddeston
- Kings Heath Boys, Kings Heath
- King's Norton Boys' School, Kings Norton
- Kings Norton Girls' School, Kings Norton
- Lordswood Boys' School, Harborne
- Lordswood Girls' School, Harborne
- Moseley School, Moseley
- Ninestiles Academy, Acocks Green
- Nishkam High School, Lozells
- North Birmingham Academy, Erdington
- Plantsbrook School, Sutton Coldfield
- Prince Albert High School, Perry Barr
- Queensbridge School, Moseley
- Rockwood Academy, Alum Rock
- St Edmund Campion RC School, Erdington
- St John Wall RC School, Handsworth
- St Paul's School for Girls, Edgbaston
- St Thomas Aquinas RC School, Kings Norton
- Saltley Academy, Bordesley Green
- Selly Park Girls' School, Selly Park
- Shenley Academy, Northfield
- Small Heath Leadership Academy, Small Heath
- Starbank School, Small Heath
- Stockland Green School, Stockland Green
- Swanshurst School, Billesley
- Tile Cross Academy, Tile Cross
- Turves Green Boys' School, Northfield
- University of Birmingham School, Selly Oak
- Washwood Heath Academy, Washwood Heath
- Waverley School, Small Heath
- Waverley Studio College, Bordesley Green
- Wheelers Lane Technology College, Kings Heath
- Windsor Olympus Academy, Winson Green*
- Yardleys School, Tyseley

*This school is located in Birmingham, but is for pupils from Sandwell

=== Grammar schools ===
- Bishop Vesey's Grammar School, Sutton Coldfield
- King Edward VI Aston School, Aston
- King Edward VI Camp Hill School for Boys, Kings Heath
- King Edward VI Camp Hill School for Girls, Kings Heath
- King Edward VI Five Ways School, Bartley Green
- King Edward VI Handsworth Grammar School for Boys, Handsworth
- King Edward VI Handsworth School, Handsworth
- Sutton Coldfield Grammar School for Girls, Sutton Coldfield

=== Special and alternative schools ===
- Baskerville School, Harborne
- Beaufort School, Hodge Hill
- Braidwood School for The Deaf, Hodge Hill
- Brays School, Stechford
- The Bridge School, Erdington
- Calthorpe Academy, Highgate
- Cherry Oak School, Selly Oak
- City of Birmingham School, Frankley
- The Dame Ellen Pinsent School, Kings Heath
- East Birmingham Network Academy, Yardley
- EBN Academy, Erdington
- The Edge Academy, Northfield
- Fox Hollies School, Moseley
- Hallmoor School, Kitts Green
- Hamilton School, Handsworth
- James Brindley School, Ladywood
- Langley School, Four Oaks
- Lea Hall Academy, Lea Hall
- Leycroft Academy, Tile Cross
- Lindsworth School, Kings Norton
- Longwill School for the Deaf, Northfield
- Mayfield School, Handsworth
- Oscott Manor School, Old Oscott
- The Pines Special School, Castle Bromwich
- Priestley Smith School, Great Barr
- Queensbury School, Erdington
- Reach School, Kings Heath
- Selly Oak Trust School, Selly Oak
- Springfield House Community Special School, Knowle, Solihull*
- Titan Aston Academy, Aston
- Titan St George's Academy, Hockley
- Uffculme School, Moseley
- Victoria School, Northfield
- Wilson Stuart School, Erdington

*This school is located in the Borough of Solihull, but is for pupils from Birmingham.

=== Further education ===
- Access Creative College
- Birmingham Metropolitan College
- BOA Stage and Screen Production Academy
- Bournville College
- Cadbury Sixth Form College
- Fircroft College
- Joseph Chamberlain Sixth Form College
- The National College for Advanced Transport and Infrastructure
- South & City College Birmingham

== Independent schools ==
=== Primary and preparatory schools ===
- Al-Ameen Primary School, Tyseley
- Birmingham Blue Coat School, Edgbaston
- Greenfields Primary School, Small Heath
- Hallfield School, Edgbaston
- The Lambs Christian School, Hockley
- Norfolk House School, Edgbaston
- Rosslyn School, Hall Green
- The Shrubbery School, Walmley
- West House School, Edgbaston
- The Wisdom Academy, Nechells

=== Senior and all-through schools ===
- Al-Burhan Grammar School, Tyseley
- Al Huda Girls' School, Saltley
- Birchfield Independent Girls' School, Birchfield
- Darul Uloom Islamic High School, Small Heath
- Edgbaston High School, Edgbaston
- Elmhurst Ballet School, Edgbaston
- Green Oak Academy, Moseley
- Hamd House School, Bordesley Green
- Hazrat Khadijatul Kubra Girls School, Small Heath
- Heritage Academy, Sparkbrook
- Highclare School, Erdington
- Jamia Islamia Birmingham, Sparkbrook
- Kimichi School, Acocks Green
- King Edward VI High School for Girls, Edgbaston
- King Edward's School, Edgbaston
- Mander Portman Woodward, Edgbaston
- Priory School, Edgbaston
- Redstone Academy for Boys, Balsall Heath
- Redstone Academy for Girls, Balsall Heath
- St George's School, Edgbaston

=== Special and alternative schools ===
- Arc Oakbridge School, Newtown
- Asprire AP School, Hall Green
- Birmingham Independent College, Aston
- Blackwater Academy, Newtown
- Camp Hill Education, Camp Hill
- Cannon Hill House, Moseley
- City United Academy, Aston
- Flexible Learning School, Hockley
- Future First Independent School, Hockley
- Green Heath School, Small Heath
- Hopwood Hall School, Edgbaston
- Imedia School, Erdington
- Myles Academy, Soho
- New Horizon Academy, Erdington
- New Perspectives School, Balsall Heath
- New Ways School, Kings Norton
- Newbury Independent School, Aston
- Orion School, Hockley
- Oscott Academy, Erdington
- Priory Woodbourne Hospital School, Edgbaston
- Riverside Education, Stechford
- RYAN Education Academy, Sparkbrook
- RYAN Education Academy Vocational Centre, Adderley Park
- St Paul's School, Balsall Heath
- Silver Birch School, Shard End
- Spring Hill High School, Erdington
- TLG North Birmingham, Kingstanding
- Values Academy, Hockley
- VASE Academy, Handsworth

=== Further education ===
- Edgbaston College
- Queen Alexandra College

== See also ==
- Education in Birmingham
