= Marston Green railway station =

Railway station in Solihull, West Midlands, England

Coordinates: 52.467°N 1.756°W

Marston Green
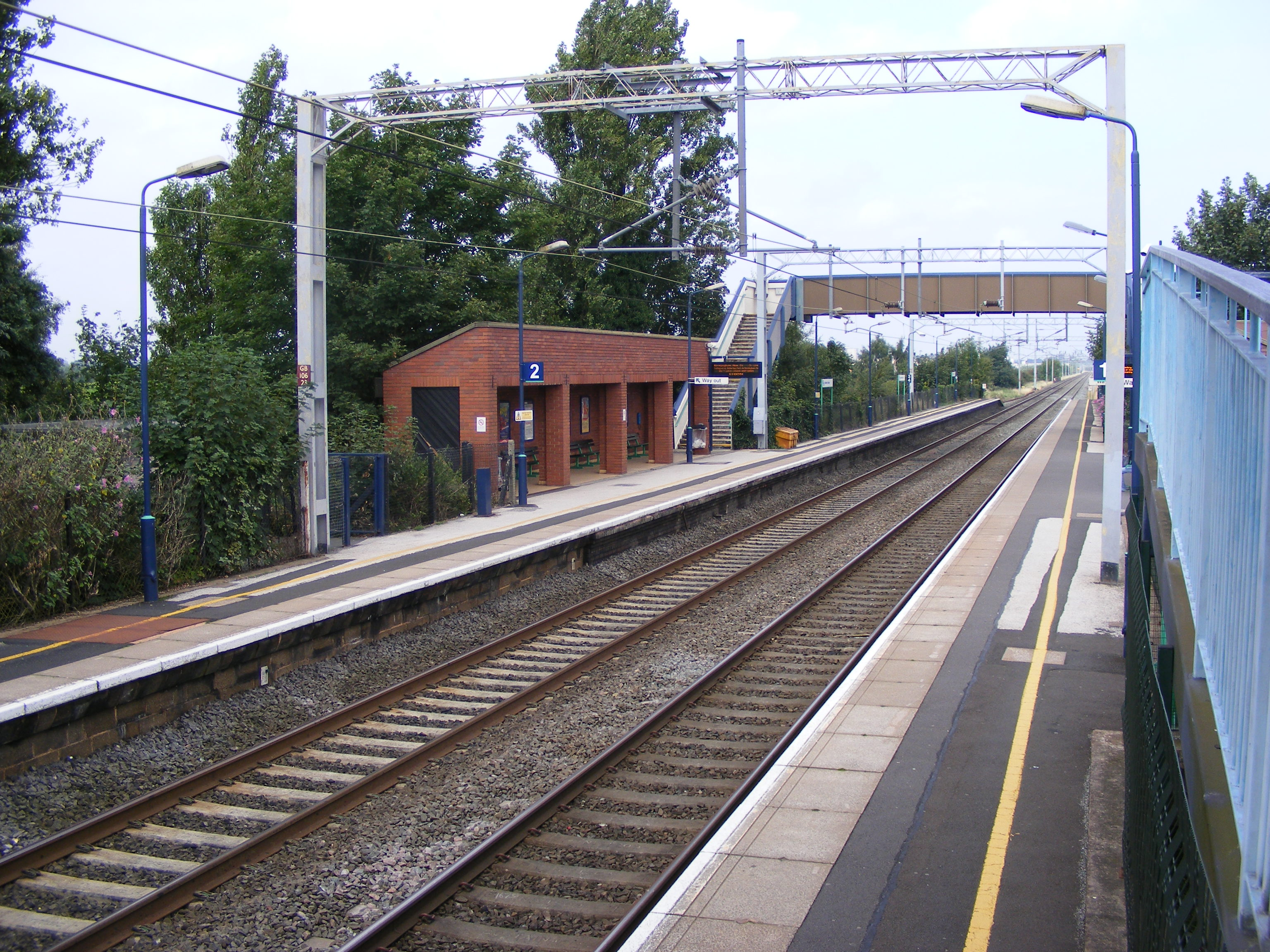

General information
- Location: Marston Green, Solihull; England
- Grid reference: SP166854
- Manager: West Midlands Railway
- Transit authority: Transport for West Midlands
- Platforms: 2

Other information
- Station code: MGN
- Fare zone: 4
- Classification: DfT category E

Key dates
- 1838: Opened

Passengers
- 2021/22: ▲0.444 million
- 2022/23: ▲0.576 million
- 2023/24: ▼0.568 million
- 2024/25: ▲0.589 million
- 2025/26: ▲0.611 million
Location
Notes
- Passenger statistics from the Office of Rail and Road

Marston Green railway station is a station serving Chelmsley Wood and Marston Green in the Metropolitan Borough of Solihull and the Birmingham suburbs of Lea Hall and Sheldon in the West Midlands County, England. The station, and all trains serving it, are operated by West Midlands Trains.

== History ==
The station opened on 9 April 1838 as part of the LNWR's line between Birmingham New Street and Coventry. Unlike many of the other small rail stations constructed in the mid 19th century around Birmingham, Marston Green station has remained open to passengers since it was opened. However, none of the railway station's original features remain, having been replaced during the 1970s.

== Facilities ==
The station has a ticket office located on platform 1 which is open Monday-Thursday 06:15-19:00, Friday 06:15-20:00, Saturday 08:00-20:00 and Sunday 09:00-14:00. When the ticket office is open tickets must be purchased before boarding the train. Outside of these times there is a ticket machine on platform 2 which accepts card payments only. Cash and voucher payments can be made to the senior conductor on the train.

The railway station is adjacent to bus stops, where buses towards Solihull and Chelmsley Wood stop.

== Services ==
The station is currently served by West Midlands Trains with West Midlands Railway branded local services between Birmingham International and Rugeley Trent Valley.

Services which start/terminate at Rugby, Northampton and London Euston (mainly early morning, late evening and Sunday services) operate under the London Northwestern Railway brand.

The typical off-peak service follows a pattern such as the one below:

Services are listed in trains per hour (tph)

Mondays to Saturdays:

- 2 tph northbound to Rugeley Trent Valley via Birmingham New Street.
- 2 tph southbound to Birmingham International only.

Sundays:

- 2 tph northbound to Birmingham New Street.
  - 1 tph continues to Rugeley Trent Valley.
- 2 tph southbound to Birmingham International.
  - 1 tph continues to London Euston.

Prior to the December 2022 timetable change, London Northwestern Railway services to Coventry, Northampton and London Euston called at Marston Green but the calls at Marston Green were mostly withdrawn due to low patronage and to improve performance. A limited London Northwestern Railway service operates at the start and end of service and on Sundays when the local West Midlands Railway service is reduced.

Preceding station	National Rail	Following station
Lea Hall or Birmingham New Street	West Midlands Railway; Birmingham International – Walsall – Rugeley Trent Valley	Birmingham International
Lea Hall towards Birmingham New Street	London Northwestern Railway London–Birmingham	Birmingham International towards London Euston

== See also ==
- Transport in Birmingham
