= Tile Cross Academy =

Location
- Gressel Lane; Tile Cross; Birmingham, West Midlands, B33 9UF; England; 52°29′00″N 1°46′11″W

Information
- Type: Academy
- Local authority: Birmingham City Council
- Trust: Washwood Heath Multi Academy Trust
- Department for Education URN: 144306 Tables
- Ofsted: Reports
- Head: Sangtrap
- Gender: Coeducational
- Age: 11 to 16
- Enrolment: 541
- Website: https://tilecross.academy/

Tile Cross Academy is a coeducational secondary school located in the Tile Cross area of Birmingham, West Midlands, England.

== Admissions ==
The school is ethnically diverse and contains around 700 pupils spread over three major buildings. The school is situated on Gressel Lane and is roughly one mile from Lea Hall railway station, operated by London Midland. It is close to the eastern boundary of Birmingham, close to the Solihull boundary.

== History ==
=== Former schools ===
The genesis of the school was three schools being built next to each other in Tile Cross, East Birmingham in the late 1950s. The famous Central Grammar School for Boys was founded in 1897 on Suffolk Street and relocated to Gressel Lane in September 1957. It was a three-form entry school with around 550 boys. During the Second World War half of the school was evacuated and shared with The West Monmouth High School for Boys at Pontypool under the Headship of Leslie Bradley, who had been appointed Headmaster in 1934. They returned in 1942 and reunited with the other half to a location in Bordesley Green.

The City then created two new schools named Byng Kenrick Girls' Grammar School and Sir Wilfrid Martineau School (named after Wilfred Byng Kenrick and Wilfrid Martineau respectively, two men who had each been prominent local politicians and Lord Mayors of Birmingham).

The two schools combined would not only cater for pupils who would have gained a place in a grammar school (See Grammar schools debate) and as well for local Birmingham children wanting the best in education. Its first headmaster, however, declared that it was his intention to compete and announced it was a bilateral rather than a secondary modern school (in contemporary parlance) and the school competed with its neighbours. Central Grammar School moved from Cherrywood Road to adjoin Byng Kenrick school for Girls and Sir Wilfrid Martineau. Byng Kenrick then amalgamated with Central Grammar School and became Byng Kenrick Central.

=== The International School and Community College East Birmingham ===
When the City abolished some grammar schools in 1974, Central and Byng Kenrick merged to create Byng Kenrick Central School (BKC), a co-educational comprehensive on Gressel Lane.
Sir Wilfrid Martineau, which had merged with 'Sticland Green Mixed Secondary Modern School', had a better reputation than BKC at the time

However, by 2000 Sir Wilfrid Martineau School was failing badly and so in an attempt to 'save it' the City hastily decided that the adjacent Byng Kenrick Central School would 'take it over' and be renamed. This was NOT a merger.

- The school was called CAL (CENTRE FOR ACCELERATED LEARNING) for 1 year between 2000 and 2001.*

The 'new school' named: The International School and Community College East Birmingham was opened in September 2001. It has since been awarded specialist Business and Enterprise College status.

A rocky beginning was brought about by the 9% pass rate for GCSEs in the July 2003 examinations, which resulted in the instant dismissal of the then-Principal, Sarah Harris.

The school struggled through September 2003, and after negotiations and an unfavourable contract with Ninestiles-Waverly Federation, the ISCCEB was accepted as the third member to "The Federation", an organisation set up by Sir Dexter Hutt, to assist failing schools to recover.

After three years in the Federation, and many major changes in school policy, ISCCEB managed to gain independence from "The Federation", and became a specialist business school, with Microsoft Platinum membership.

=== The International School ===
The school had been chosen by the Labour government along with 82 other Birmingham schools for refurbishment or an entire re-build.

However, after the 2010 elections all plans had been scrapped by the new Conservative government in an attempt to reduce spending.

After months of negotiations and changes to the original plan, it was finally agreed 9 schools would be put forward for refurbishment by contractor Lend Lease.

Refurbishment began mid-2011 and was completed on 27 February 2012.

The school faced a series of changes, most of them to its advantage. However, the historic Martineau tower and the Central building were knocked down and the off-site Sheldon building given to the council.

=== Tile Cross Academy ===
Previously a community school administered by Birmingham City Council, in May 2017 The International School converted to academy status. The school is now sponsored by the Washwood Heath Academy Trust.

During the process of converting the school to an academy, a name change was proposed "We do propose changing the name of the school from The International School to Tile Cross Academy and would welcome your thoughts on this proposed name change" - this resulted in the school changing its name to "Tile Cross Academy".

Way back in 2015 many found it offensive to suggest that only academy schools are qualified to help others and the debate is there. Existing money (promised but with no worthy governance) to hard-working pupils & staff or as a means of driving up educational standards in disadvantaged areas (See What are academies?)

== Academic performance ==
The July 2007 examination results were that 50.5% of pupils passed with 5 (or more) A*-C grades at GCSE, an increase of 41% in 5 years. In the 2010 GCSE examination results :

- Every student in Year 11 achieved a nationally recognised qualification.
- 84% of the year group achieved 5 or more GCSE A*-C grades or equivalent.
- 41% of students achieved 5 or more A*-C grades at GCSE including English and Maths. Double the figures of the 2008 results.
- 92% achieved 5 or more A*-G grades.
- Significant improvements were seen in the core subjects of English, Maths, Science and ICT.

== Notable former pupils ==
=== Central Grammar School for Boys ===
- Ron Ball, PCC since 2012 for Warwickshire
- Joseph Biddulph, linguist, author and publisher.
- Bob Catley, lead singer of Magnum.
- George Chandler (librarian), Director General from 1974-80 of the National Library of Australia.
- Tony Garnett, television and film producer, produced This Life. Cathy Come Home is a 1966 BBC television play by Jeremy Sandford, produced by Tony Garnett and directed by Ken Loach, about homelessness
- John Harris, Chairman from 1982-94 of East Midlands Electricity
- Alec Hastilow CBE, Chairman from 1962-8 of Smith & Nephew
- Denver Hewlett, Chief Executive since 1996 of Glen Dimplex Home Appliances
- Trevor Jones (1941-1946) England and F.I.H International Hockey Umpire. Hon Sec. Great Britain Hockey Board 1982 - 4 (GB Men won the Bronze Medal at the 1984 Los Angeles Games)
- Kevin McNally, who has made many TV and film appearances, including Pirates of the Caribbean. He was first put on the stage by Steve Walker in "The Long and the Short and the Tall".
- Members of The Moody Blues - John Lodge
- Jeff Watson, broadcaster and documentary maker and author, now in Sydney, Australia.
- Nicol Williamson, Shakespearian actor, once described by John Osborne as "the greatest actor since Marlon Brando."
- Tony Hiam who invented Extreme Ironing in 1980, inspired by his eccentric brother-in-law. Tony has since gone on to be more eccentric.

=== Sir Wilfrid Martineau School ===
- Mick Rathbone, Blackburn Rovers footballer, as well as beginning his career at Birmingham, has a distinguished career still as physiotherapist.

=== Byng Kenrick Central School ===
- Anthony Armatrading, nationally-known actor (Casualty) and brother of singer Joan Armatrading
- June Pennell née Daniel, well known for her pro-active support in Canine Psychology Principal of The International School for Canine Behaviour and Psychology
