= Star Bank =

Star Bank or Starbank or variation may refer to:

- Starbank Park, Newhaven, Edinburgh, Scotland, UK; a park
- Starbank School, Birmingham, West Midlands, England, UK; a non-selective community school
- Star Bank LPGA Classic, a former LPGA women's golf tournament
- STAR (interbank network)
- Star Banc Corporation, a former Cincinnati, Ohio, USA-based regional bank holding company

== See also ==
- Bankable star
- Star (disambiguation)
- Bank (disambiguation)
