= Waverley School =

Waverley School could refer to any one of several schools:

== United Kingdom ==
- Waverley School, Birmingham
- Waverley Abbey School, Surrey

== Elsewhere ==
- Waverley College, New South Wales, Australia
- Waverley Elementary School, Vancouver, Canada
- Waverley Primary School, Taranaki, New Zealand
- Waverley Girls' High School, Waverley, Johannesburg, South Africa
