= Education in Birmingham =

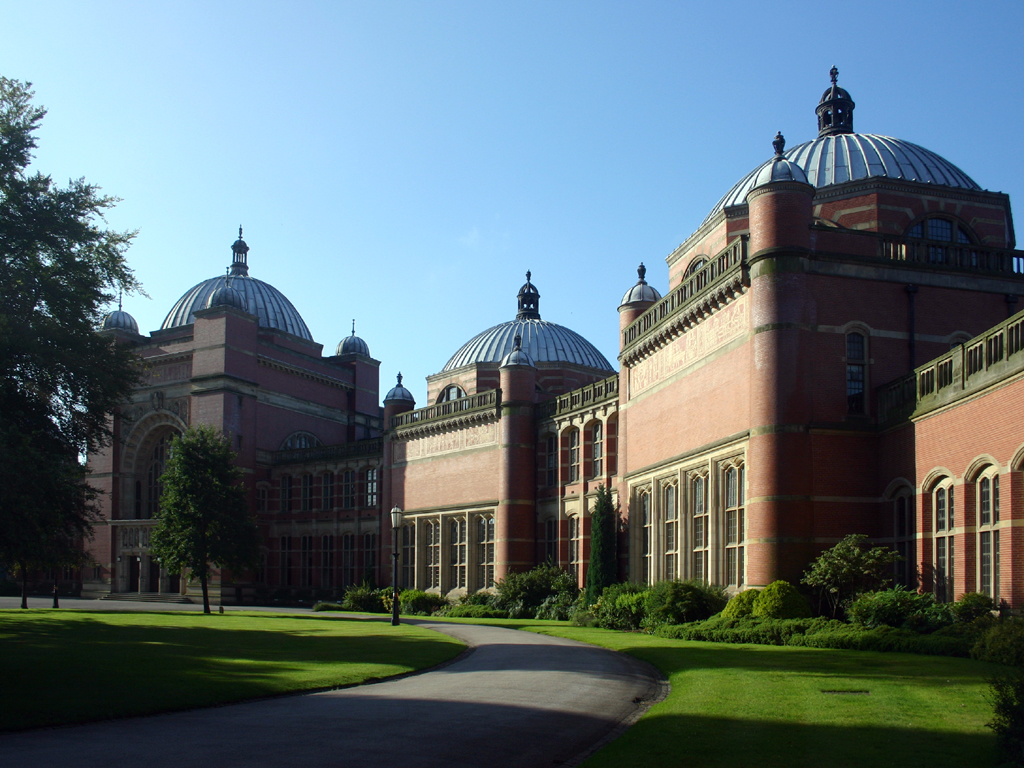
The University of Birmingham

This article is about education in Birmingham, England.

== History ==
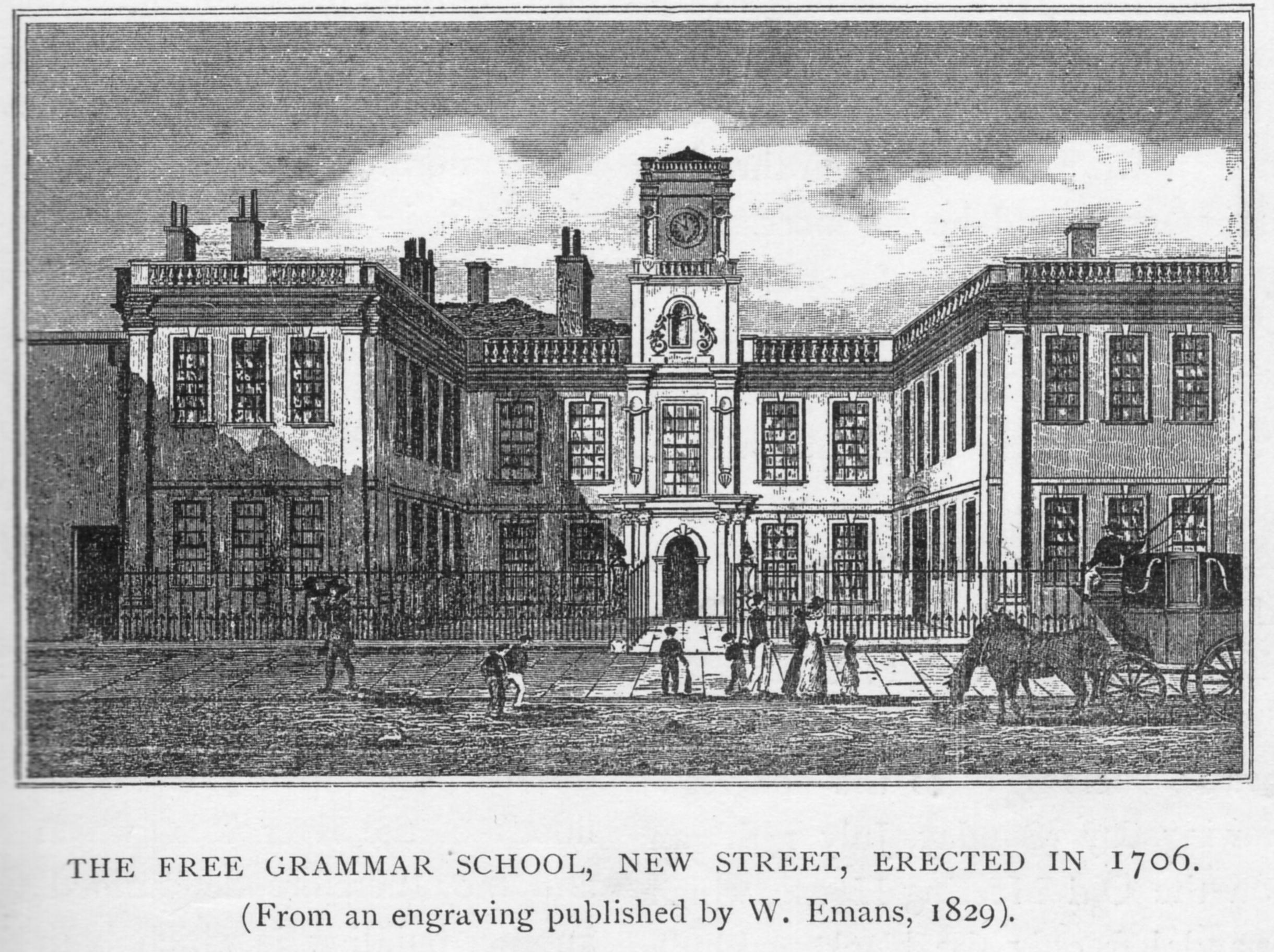
King Edward's School, New Street site, 1731–1834

King Edward's School was opened by the Guild of the Holy Cross and received the royal charter of King Edward VI on 2 January 1552 A new building opened on New Street in 1731, and was replaced in turn in 1835, before the school moved to Edgbaston in the 1930s.

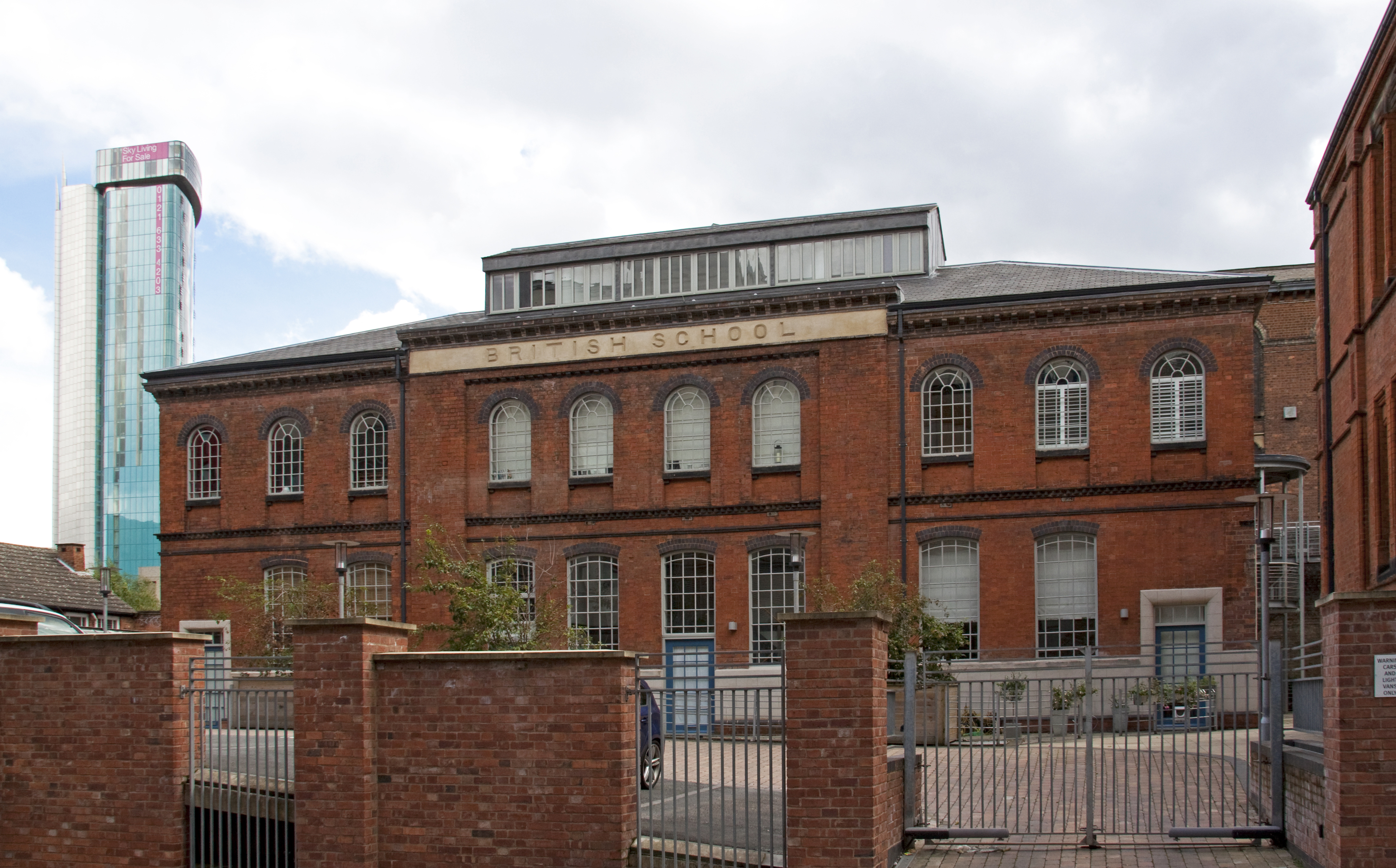
British School, Severn Street

The non-conformist Royal Lancasterian Free School (later British School) opened on 11 September 1809 in Severn Street, based on the system devised by Joseph Lancaster. It was notable in teaching pupils of any denomination, including Jewish children. It closed in 1933, but the building, which was extended several times, survives.

== Primary and secondary education ==
=== State schools ===
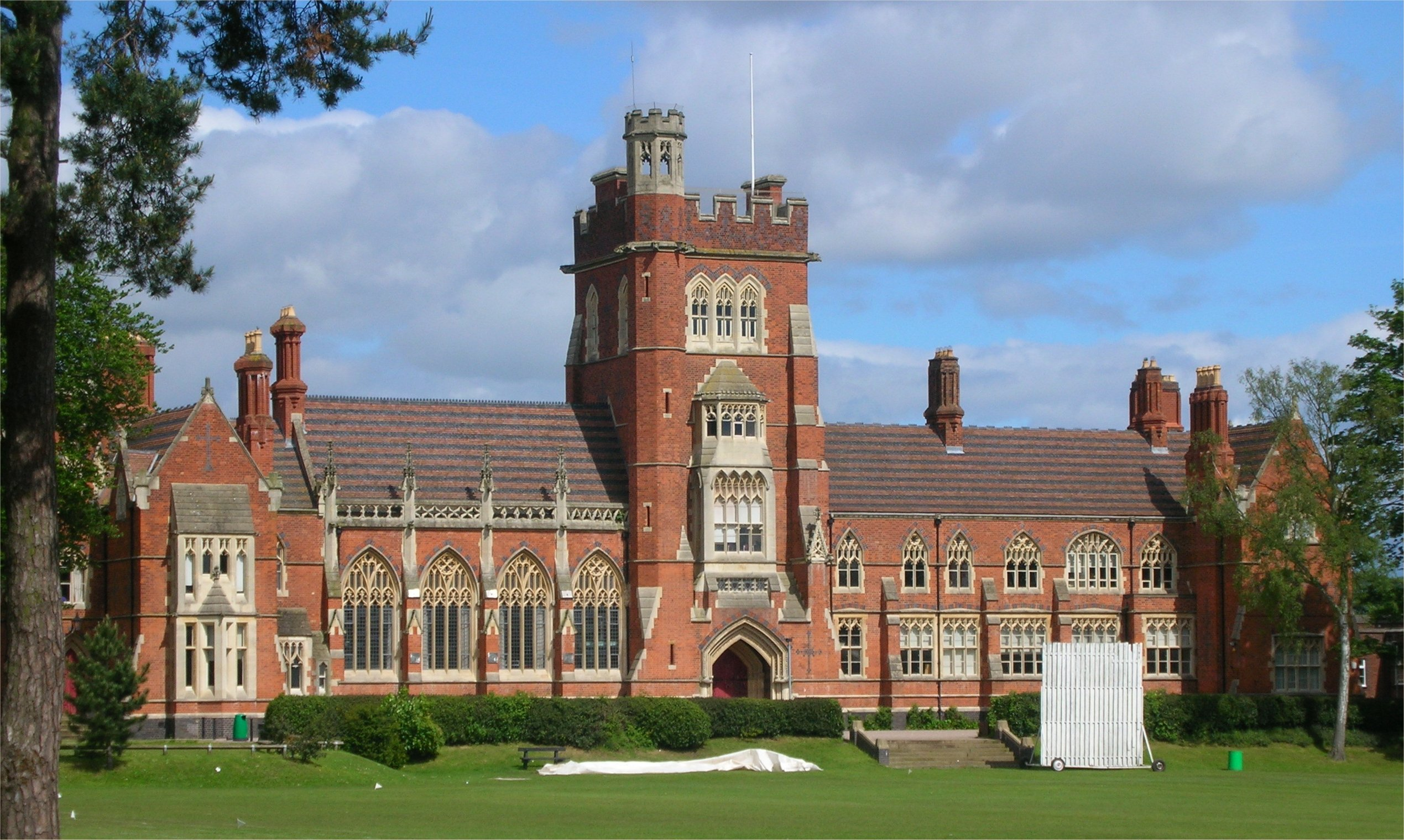
Moseley School

As in the rest of England and Wales, education is compulsory in Birmingham between the ages of 5 and 16. The majority of children are educated in state schools. Schools generally follow the National Curriculum although this is not legally compulsory for some types of schools, such as academies. These schools are mostly divided into primary schools for children from Reception to Year 6 (5 to 11) and secondary schools for children from Year 7 to Year 11 (11 to 16). Most secondary schools in Birmingham also have a sixth form (Years 12 and 13), but sixth form education is also provided in a number of sixth form colleges and further education colleges. There are a small number of "all-through" schools, a number of special schools and some alternative provision schools.

The majority of Birmingham's primary schools are maintained schools under the control of the local education authority (LEA). However, 48 of Birmingham's 79 secondary state schools are now academies. There are a large number of voluntary aided schools within the state system, primarily Roman Catholic schools, but also schools whose religious basis is Anglican, Jewish and Islamic and schools which are non-denominational. Some have become part of multi-academy trusts. There are also approximately 31 free schools in the Birmingham area.

Most state secondary schools in Birmingham are comprehensive, but a number of historic grammar schools, among them Bishop Vesey's Grammar School, Handsworth Grammar School and Sutton Coldfield Grammar School for Girls and the grammar schools of the Foundation of the Schools of King Edward VI, survived the policy of moving to a comprehensive system in the 1960s and 1970s - mostly due to the historical accident of their exact legal relationship with the LEA.

=== Private schools ===
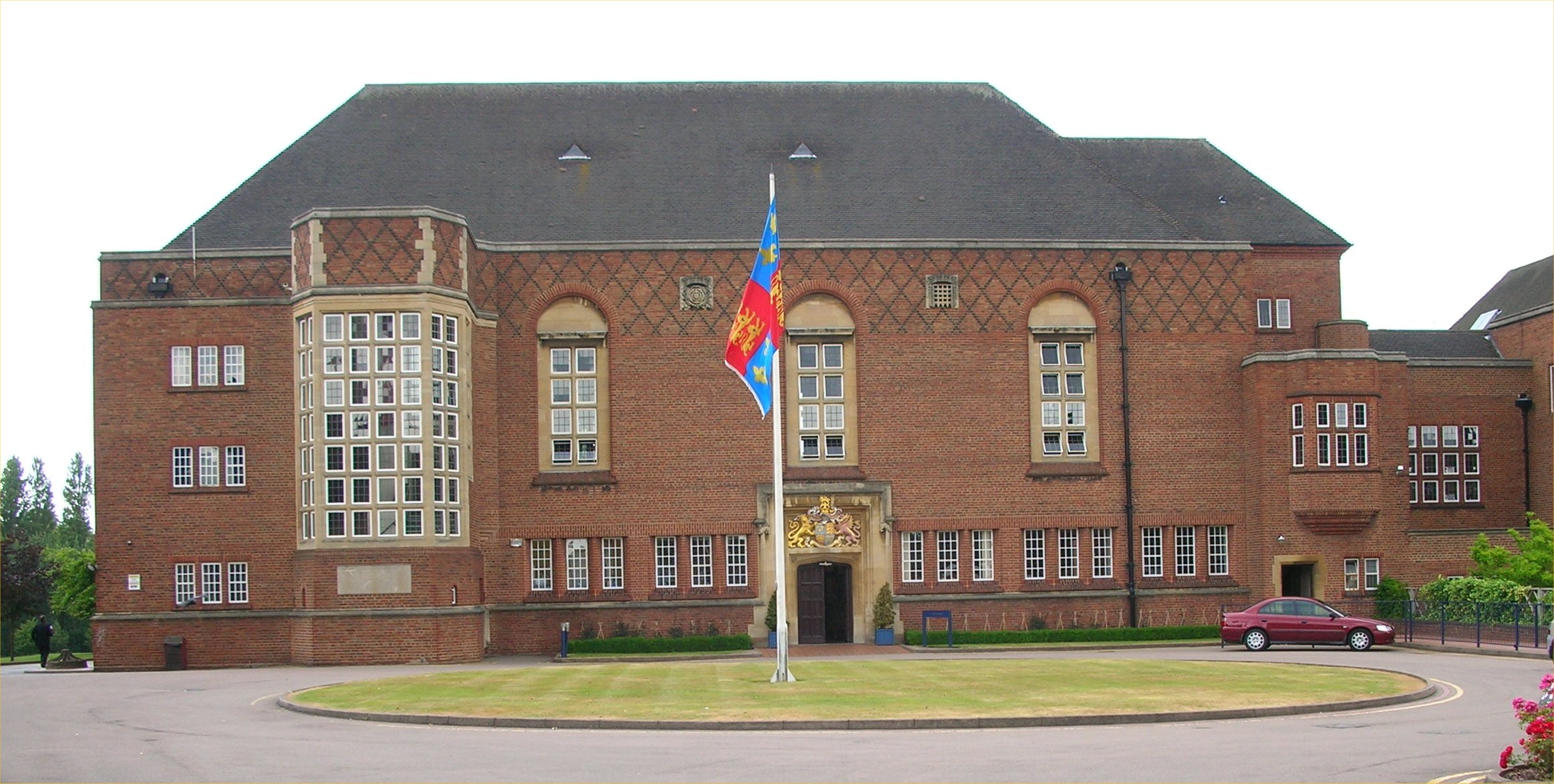
King Edward's School, Edgbaston

A minority of Birmingham's children attend private schools which range from small institutions to historic schools of national prestige such as King Edward's School.

=== Academies ===
Forty-eight secondary schools in the Birmingham Local Authority are open academies as of August 2017. These are 29 MATs (multi-academy trusts) and 19 SATs (single academy trusts). A further six schools are in the pipeline to become converter academies and three are in the pipeline to become sponsored academies.

109 Primary schools are open academies as of August 2017 with three in the converter pipeline and two in the sponsored academy pipelines.

There are also two all-through schools which have become academies and three special schools. One all-through school is in the sponsored academy pipeline.

== Further education ==
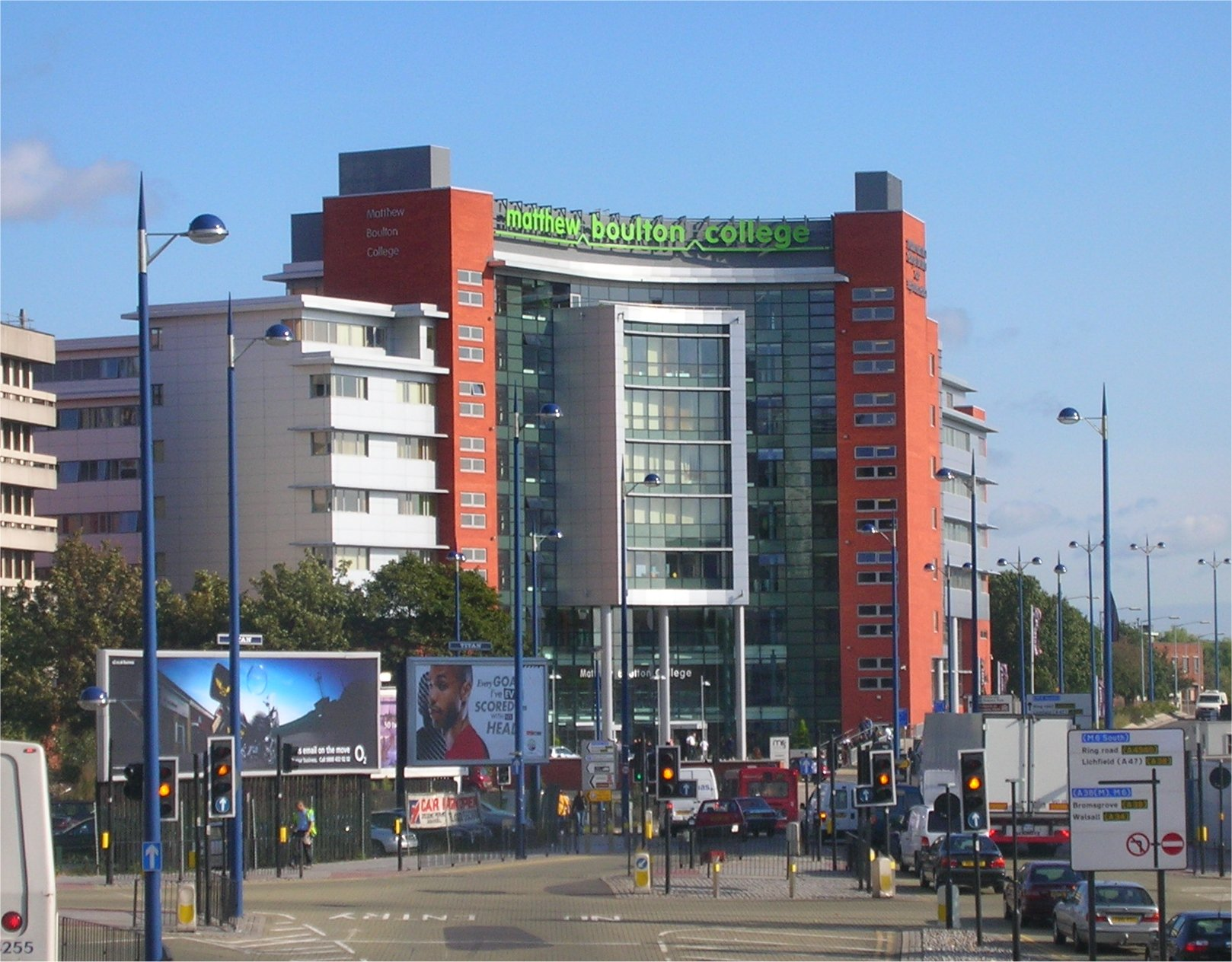
Birmingham Metropolitan College, Matthew Boulton Campus

Birmingham has several colleges of further education funded primarily by the Learning and Skills Council, including City College, Josiah Mason College, Cadbury College, Queen Alexandra College, Bournville College, and Birmingham Metropolitan College. Several of these also offer courses in higher education in conjunction with external colleges and universities. University College Birmingham specialises in vocational courses in both the Higher Education and Further Education sectors.

In addition to the numerous institutions which offer education primarily to full-time students and to those pursuing vocational development, there are a wide number of courses aimed primarily at part-time and recreational learners. The city council's Birmingham Adult Educational Service (BAES) offers around 4000 different courses each year at around 70 different centres in diverse subjects such as foreign languages, information technology, mathematics, literacy and various types of creative arts. Some courses allow the students to achieve qualifications such as GCSEs and A-levels. BAES also provides teaching in English for Speakers of Other Languages (ESOL) for the many inhabitants of the city who do not speak English as a mother-tongue.

Similar courses are offered by many of the city's further education colleges, and various arts organisations such as the mac offer workshops in the creative arts. Experienced musicians from ground roots enterprises such as Punch Records in The Custard Factory host many 'Urban Workshops' for modern music including street-level DJ mixing tuition and dance.

== Higher education ==
Birmingham is home to seven universities (date of being awarded university status)

- University of Birmingham (1900 by royal charter)
- Aston University (1966 by royal charter)
- Birmingham City University (1992)
- Birmingham Newman University (2012)
- University College Birmingham (2012)
- The University of Law (2012, private teaching university)
- Arden University (2015, private teaching university)

=== Arts education ===
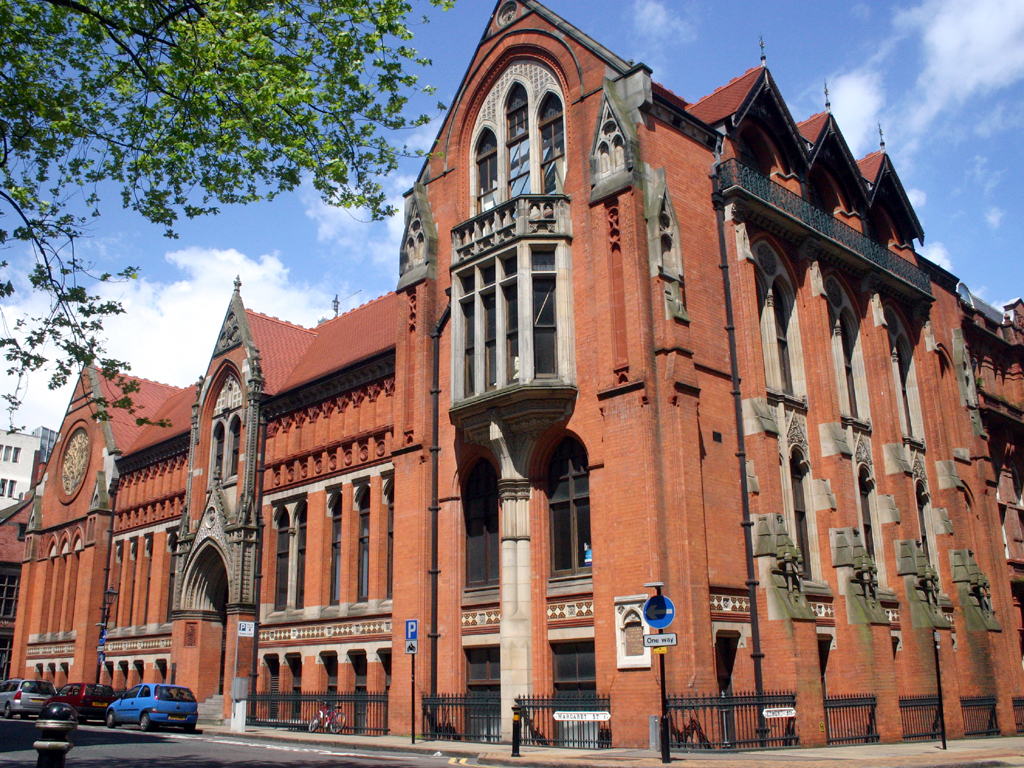
Birmingham School of Art, now part of the Birmingham Institute of Art and Design

Birmingham City University (BCU) in particular has a significant role in higher education in the arts in Birmingham. The Royal Birmingham Conservatoire, now part of the university, was formed as the Birmingham School of Music in 1859 and formerly constituted in 1886. It is one of only nine conservatoires in the United Kingdom and the only one which is also a university faculty. The conservatoire has strong links with the City of Birmingham Symphony Orchestra whose former conductor, Sir Simon Rattle, is the conservatoire's president. The conservatoire moved from their location in Adrian Boult Hall to their new state-of-the-art building on the city centre campus of the university.

The Birmingham Institute of Art and Design (BIAD), another faculty of BCU, is one of the largest faculties of art, design and media education in the United Kingdom. BIAD includes the Bournville Centre for Visual Arts, the Birmingham School of Art and the School of Jewellery (in the Jewellery Quarter), which highlights the importance of jewellery manufacture in the city.

Royal Birmingham Conservatoire's School of Acting, founded in 1936, is one of the United Kingdom's leading vocational drama schools, offering higher education courses in drama as well as a range of part-time, summer schools and short courses for adults and children. Its merger with BCU was announced in June 2005.

Elmhurst Ballet School is the oldest vocational dance school in the United Kingdom and offers dance training and academic education to pupils of secondary school age. The school was originally located in Camberley, Surrey but after becoming an associate school of the Birmingham Royal Ballet in 2002, it relocated to Edgbaston in Birmingham in 2004.

== Libraries ==
The city council is also responsible for the provision of libraries throughout the city. There are 41 local libraries in addition to Library of Birmingham, reputedly one of the largest public libraries in Europe. According to city council figures, Birmingham's library system has over 2.7 million books and receives over 4 million visitors each year.

== See also ==
- St Mary's College, Oscott - a Catholic seminary
- Birmingham Statistical Society (19th century)
- List of schools in Birmingham
