= St Paul's School for Girls, Birmingham =

St. Paul's School for Girls

Location
- Vernon Road; Edgbaston, Birmingham, B16 9SL; England; 52°28′32″N 1°56′27″W

Information
- Type: Comprehensive voluntary aided school
- Motto: Omnibus omnia All things to all people
- Religious affiliation: Roman Catholic
- Established: 1908
- Founder: Sisters of Charity of St Paul the Apostle
- Local authority: Birmingham
- Specialist: Maths & Computing, Science
- Department for Education URN: 103531 Tables
- Ofsted: Reports
- Chair: Mary Browning
- Head teacher: D E Casserly
- Staff: c. 65 teaching c. 45 supporting
- Gender: Girls
- Age: 11 to 19
- Enrolment: 968
- Website: http://www.stpaulgl.bham.sch.uk

St Paul's School For Girls is a voluntary aided, comprehensive, girls' school in Edgbaston, Birmingham, UK,

== Admissions ==
It is a Roman Catholic school, and became a specialist school in maths and computing in September 2005. It is ethnically diverse, with a mixture of Black and White English/Irish pupils.

It is situated just north of the A456 and B4125, just south of Edgbaston Reservoir. The school is named after St Paul's Convent, and the headmistresses were nuns until 1998.

== History ==
It was founded on 7 October 1908, from an earlier establishment based on Whittall Street. St Paul's Convent had been founded at Selly Park in 1864. In the 1940s, it became a Grammar School with selective entry based on the 11-plus. In 1975, it became a Comprehensive School.

Part of the school was destroyed by fire in November 1973. Mother Teresa visited on 12 September 1974. In 2010 a new Maths and English building was constructed named 'The Sister Suite' in reference to the nuns who founded the school, certain rooms inside the building were named after notable Sisters in the school's history.

== Academic performance ==
It has relatively high GCSE pass rates for similar schools in the Birmingham LEA and in England. In 2009 it got the second best A-level results for comprehensive schools in Birmingham, with results similar to a grammar school.

== Notable former pupils ==
- Clare Short (b. 1946) – Labour Party Member of Parliament for Birmingham Ladywood (1983 to 2010)
- Julie Walters (b. 1950) – actress
- Cherie Nursalim (b. 1967) – Indonesian businesswoman and philanthropist
- Sarah Smart (b. 1977) – actress

== See also ==
- Highclare School, an independent school in Sutton Coldfield founded by St Paul's Convent.
