= Sheldon Country Park =

Country park in Birmingham, England

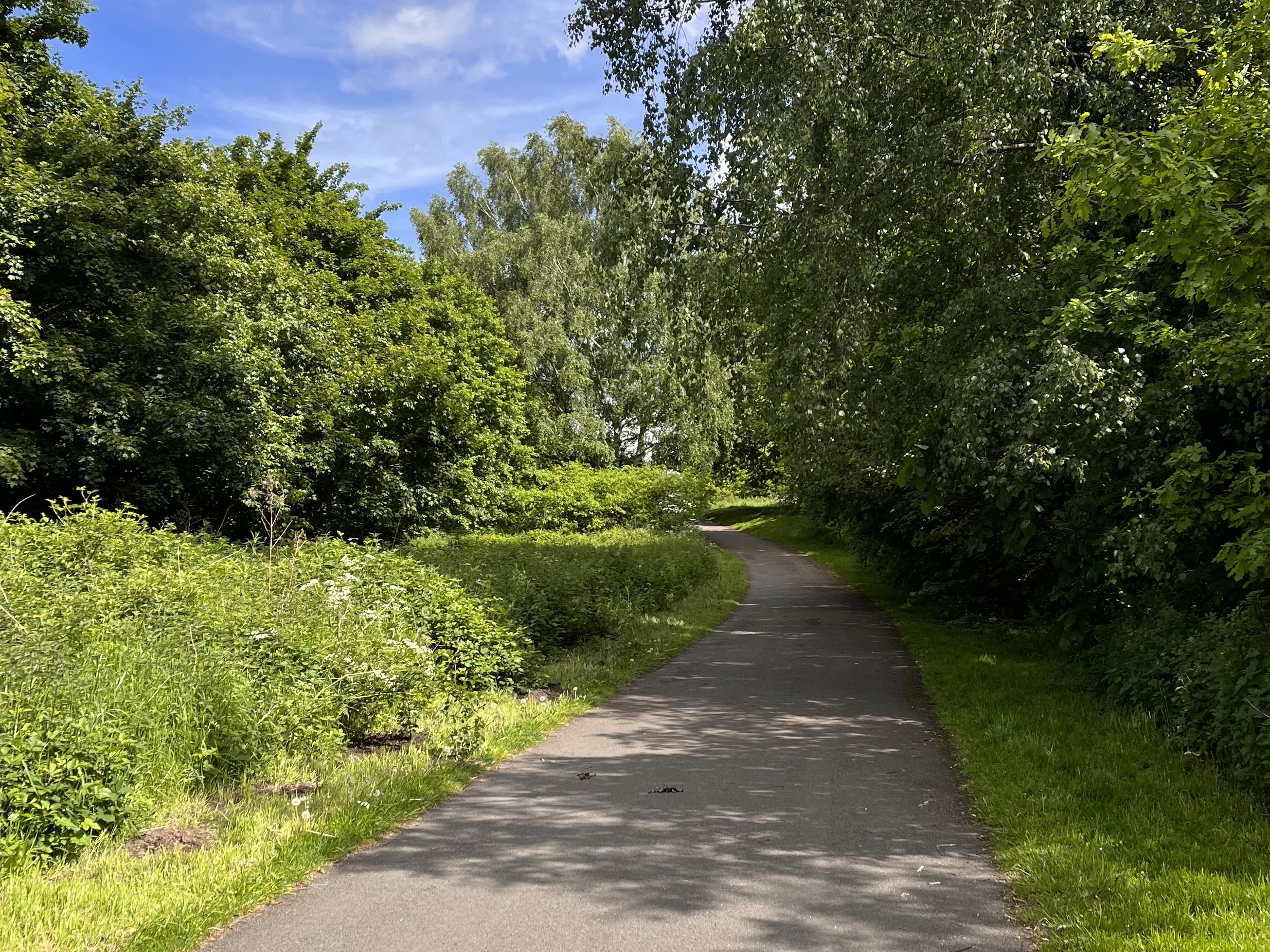
- Sheldon Country Park towards the runway.
- Interactive map of Sheldon Country Park
- Type: Country Park
- Location: Sheldon, Birmingham, UK
- Coordinates: 52.461°N 1.774°W
- Area: 300 acres (120 ha)
- Operator: Birmingham City Council
- Website: https://www.birmingham.gov.uk/sheldonpark

Sheldon Country Park is a country park in the east of Birmingham, England. It was established in 1986 and, at roughly 300 acres (120 ha), is one of Birmingham's larger country parks. The park boasts vast areas of wetland, grassland, ancient hedgerows, and some mature woodland. These diverse habitats nurture a wide range of plant and animal species. Two watercourses, Westley Brook and Hatchford Brook, flow through the park, both teeming with aquatic life. Herons and Kingfishers can frequently be spotted hunting for fish along the banks. Park Rangers are available on site to offer help and assistance.

== Old Rectory Farm ==
The most popular attraction in Sheldon Country Park is Old Rectory Farm, which dates back to the 17th century as a dairy farm. Today Old Rectory Farm is a thriving demonstration farm, stocked with Jersey cattle, ponies, pigs, goats, sheep, donkeys, chickens, geese, ducks, turkeys and guinea pigs. Visitors are offered a unique opportunity to come into close contact with large farm animals and to see traditional methods of agriculture. The farm was home to the celebrated clergyman Thomas Bray between 1690 and 1721. The facility, run by the Park Rangers on behalf of Birmingham City Council, is free and open all year except for Christmas Eve and Day. Seasonal activities are organised at the farm by the Rangers and Friends' group. Please note that dogs are not allowed inside the farm and that you are encouraged by the Park Rangers not to feed the animals.

== Tea Room ==
Within Old Rectory Farm there is a small tea room serving a range of food and drinks throughout the year to park users. Seating is available outside and inside, but packed lunches are not to be consumed within the tea rooms and garden. Rectory Lawn Picnic Area is designated for packed lunches and can be found at the front of the farmhouse. During the summer months an ice cream cart can be found at the entrance to the farm on hot sunny days. The opening times are in line with the farm operating hours.

== Airport Viewing Area ==
Another unique experience at Sheldon Country Park is the opportunity to watch aeroplanes from Birmingham International Airport. This allows aviation enthusiasts to enjoy close-up views of aircraft as they take off and land. It lies just under a mile away from Old Rectory Farm, and can only be accessed on foot (no motor vehicles).

== Friends of Sheldon Country Park ==
The park has an active Friends' group who are dedicated to help promote and preserve Sheldon Country Park by carrying out fundraising activities throughout the year to raise money for projects they would like to see on site. These can include purchasing new animals, new accommodation quarters and site maintenance. The group also carry out brook clearances and litter picks in the Country Park. To find out more visit linktr.ee/foscp or speak to the Park Rangers. Donations are kindly appreciated!
