= Hallmoor School =

Location
- Mirfield road Kitts Green; Birmingham, West Midlands, B33 9QY; England; 52°28′54″N 1°47′01″W

Information
- Type: Special school; Academy
- Established: 1952
- Local authority: Birmingham City Council
- Trust: Forward Education Trust
- Department for Education URN: 144336 Tables
- Ofsted: Reports
- Gender: Coeducational
- Age: 4 to 19
- Enrolment: 253
- Website: www.hallmoor.fet.ac

Hallmoor School is a coeducational special school located in the Kitts Green area of Birmingham, West Midlands, England. It first opened in 1952; The school is for young people with special educational needs from age 4 to 19.

Previously a community school administered by Birmingham City Council, in April 2017 Hallmoor School converted to academy status. The school is now sponsored by the Forward Education Trust.
