= BOA Digital Technologies Academy =

BOA Digital
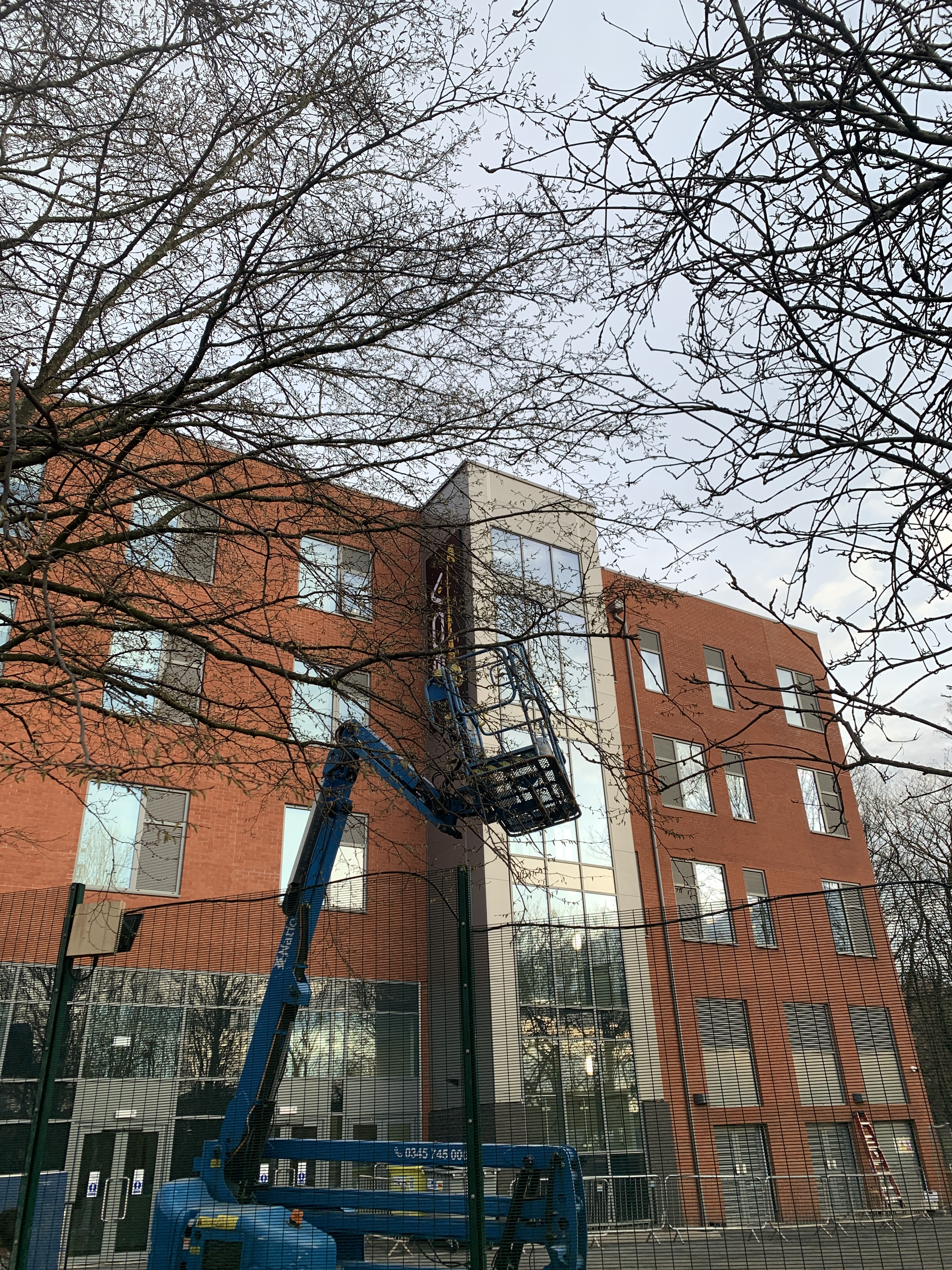

Location
- 47 Barrack Street; Birmingham, B7 4EU; England; 52.4850°N 1.8786°W

Information
- Type: Academy
- Motto: Compassion to Lead, Courage to Innovate, Curisoity to Discover
- Trust: BOA Group
- Department for Education URN: 149042 Tables
- Ofsted: Reports
- Principal: Dr Jonathan Morris
- Age: 11 to 18
- Website: www.boa-digital.co.uk

BOA Digital Technologies Academy (also known as BOA Digital) is a secondary school in Nechells, Birmingham. It opened in September 2022 and the principal is Jonathan Morris. The school has Good/Requires improvement Ofsted ratings. It is part of the BOA Group which also contains BOA Creative Digital Performing Arts Academy and BOA Stage and Screen Academy.

== History ==
The application to make BOA Digital was published in July 2016, 8 years before the school opened, and outlines how they believe technology is the future. It also outlines their investment into digital technologies and how they will use educational technology in order to achieve this.

The school got the green light to open, and the opening was planned for September 2018 with plans to “produce Birmingham's answer to Steve Jobs and Mark Zuckerberg.” However, the school did not opened on time for September 2018 due to unknown reasons.

In October 2021, they announced that they have appointed principal Paul Averis as the school's first principal and announced that the school will open and let in their first year 7 in take in September 2022.

Their first KS4/GCSE cohort was welcomed in September 2025. Also in September 2025 Dr Jonathan Morris was appointed as the new principal of BOA Digital. It is also planned to welcome their new sixth form in September 2027.

== Admission ==
Admission to the school is considered easy, as the school has a 100% acceptance rate if it is put as your first choice. The school invites people based on their results on the fair-banding test. Based on this fair-banding test, prospective students will be placed into 5 equal bands.

== BOA Group ==
BOA Digital is part of the BOA Group, which is a MAT which also operates 2 other schools, BOA Creative Digital Performing Arts Academy, and BOA Stage and Screen. The CEO is currently Kate Tague. BOA Group also used to have management of the The Old Rep theatre, which they managed from 2014 to June 2024. However, despite no longer managing the theatre, they still operate shows there using students from the group.
