= Ark Kings Academy =

- Kings Norton; Birmingham, West Midlands; England

Information
- Type: Academy
- Motto: Wisdom, Resilience & Kindness
- Established: 1967
- Local authority: Birmingham City Council
- Trust: Ark Schools
- Department for Education URN: 137578 Tables
- Principal: Caz Brasenell
- Gender: Co‑educational
- Age: 3 to 16
- Enrolment: 795
- Website: http://www.arkkingsacademy.org

Ark Kings Academy is a co‑educational all‑through school located in Kings Norton, Birmingham, West Midlands, England. It educates pupils aged 3 to 16 and operates across two sites: a primary phase at Tees Grove and a secondary phase at Shannon Road. The school is part of the Ark Schools network, a multi‑academy trust and registered charity in England.

== History ==
Ark Kings Academy traces its origins to Primrose Hill Senior School, which opened in 1967. It was subsequently renamed Kings Norton High School in 1993. In September 2012 the school converted to academy status as Ark Kings Academy.

A primary phase, originally Primrose Hill Primary School, became an academy known as Ark Rose Primary Academy in 2012. This primary phase merged with Ark Kings Academy in September 2017.

== Governance ==
The academy is sponsored by the Ark Schools multi‑academy trust, which operates a network of schools across England.

== Ofsted ==
In 2022, a full inspection judged the academy to be 'Inadequate', noting concerns about pupil safety and behaviour.

A subsequent inspection in March 2024 rated Ark Kings Academy as 'Good' in all areas, including quality of education, behaviour and attitudes, personal development, and leadership and management.

== Performance and Demographics ==
According to UK government school data, Ark Kings Academy is an academy sponsor led institution with mixed intake, providing education from ages 3 to 16.

== Structure ==
The academy operates across two sites:

- Primary phase – Tees Grove, Kings Norton
- Secondary phase – Shannon Road, Kings Norton

== Sixth Form Pathways ==
Ark Kings Academy does not operate its own sixth form. Pupils typically progress to local sixth form colleges or other institutions after Year 11.

== Notable former staff and pupils ==
- **Dene Cropper** – English former professional footballer and physics teacher at Kings Norton High School (predecessor of Ark Kings Academy).

== See also ==
- Ark Schools
- Education in England
- List of schools in Birmingham
