= Stechford railway station =

Railway station in Birmingham, England

Stechford
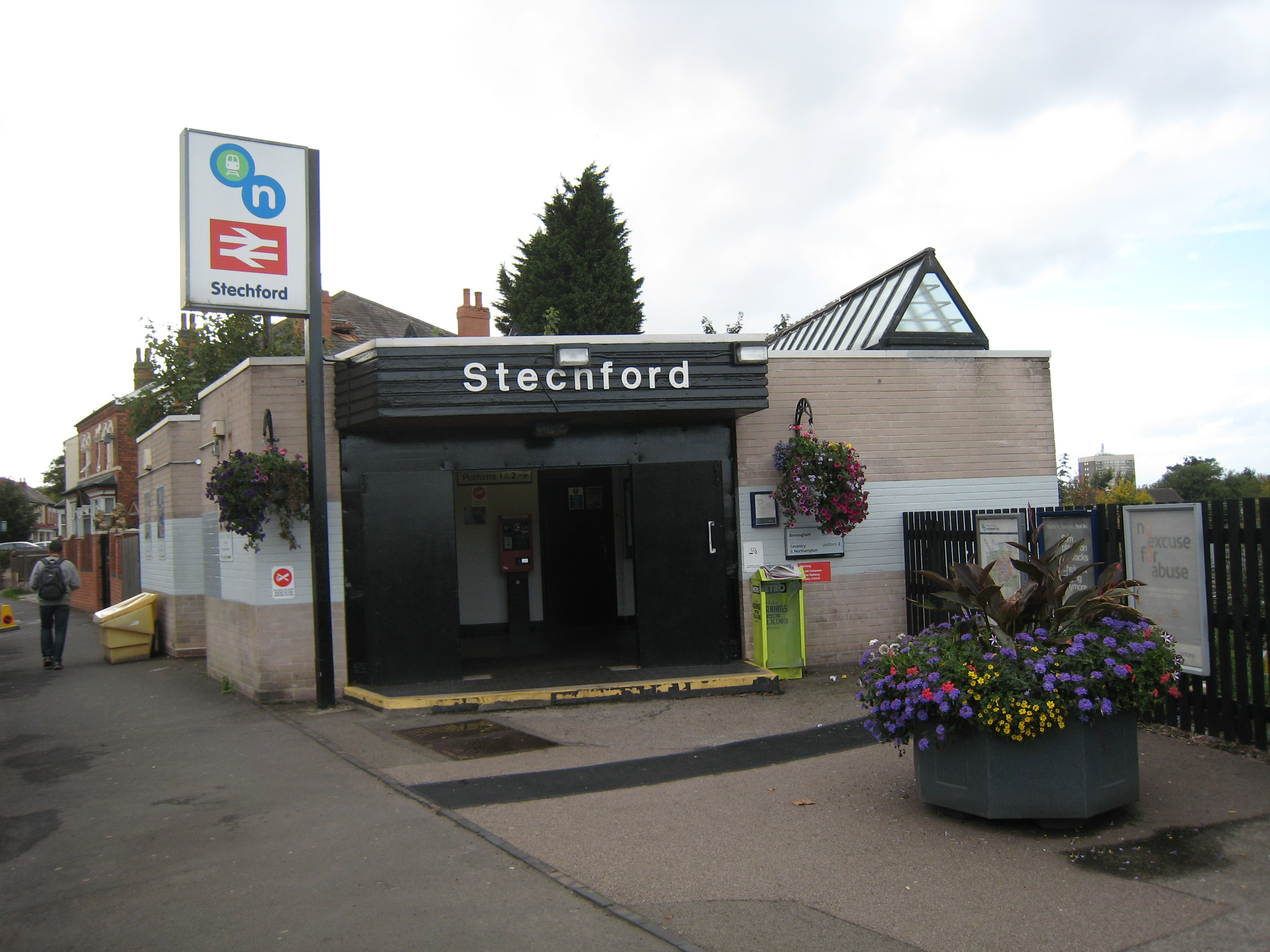

General information
- Location: Stechford, Birmingham; England
- Coordinates: 52.484°N 1.811°W
- Grid reference: SP128874
- Manager: West Midlands Railway
- Transit authority: Transport for West Midlands
- Platforms: 3

Other information
- Station code: SCF
- Fare zone: 3
- Classification: DfT category E

History
- Opened: 1844

Passengers
- 2021/22: ▲0.234 million
- 2022/23: ▲0.314 million
- 2023/24: ▲0.377 million
- 2024/25: ▲0.417 million
- 2025/26: ▲0.454 million
Location
Notes
- Passenger statistics from the Office of Rail and Road

Stechford railway station serves the Stechford area of Birmingham, England on Victoria Road, just off Station Road, which is part of the A4040 Birmingham outer ring road. The station and all trains serving it are operated by West Midlands Trains. It lies at the junction between the Birmingham to Coventry line and the predominantly freight-only Stechford-Aston spur.

The station was much more important at the end of the 19th century, retaining a working freight yard until as late as the 1980s. The yard tracks have since been lifted. The 19th-century bridge over the railway underwent renovation from August to September 2006.

== History ==
The original London & Birmingham Railway Stechford station opened in December 1844 with staggered platforms on either side of a level-crossing. In 1882, the level crossing became a bridge (Station Road) over the railway, the platforms were moved to the west (Birmingham) side of the bridge and a station building on the bridge became the entrance to both sets of platforms via steps. Around 1963, this building was demolished (the supports can still be seen next to the Station Road bridge) and a small utilitarian replacement building was provided in Frederick Road.

On 28 February 1967, Stechford station was the scene of a train collision.

The line to/from Aston was in the past used by a limited direct service between Walsall and Birmingham International and by Wrexham & Shropshire services between Wrexham General and London Marylebone (though not calling here) until January 2011. The direct line through to Aston is now used by limited freight services only.

Until 2020, Stechford station had poor access for people with mobility impairments. Steep steps led from the ticket office to the Birmingham platform, and the Coventry platform could be reached only by traversing a further bridge. In 2019, the Department for Transport invested £3.9 million into an overhaul of the station. The renovation was completed in 2020 with construction of a new footbridge with lifts, connected by a ramp from the booking office.

== Facilities ==
The station has a ticket office located at the station entrance off Station Road which is open Monday-Thursday 08:00–15:00, Friday 08:00–20:00, Saturday 09:00–18:00 and Sunday 11:00–13:00. When the ticket office is open tickets must be purchased before boarding the train. Outside of these times there is a ticket machine outside the ticket office which accepts card payments only – cash and voucher payments can be made to the senior conductor on the train.

Cycle parking is available.

Step free access is available between the platforms via lifts and an overbridge. Station staff provide information and assistance whilst the ticket office is open. Outside of these hours information is available from help points located on both platforms and from the senior conductor on the train.

== Services ==
Stechford is served by two trains per hour, to Rugeley Trent Valley via Birmingham New Street northbound and to Birmingham International southbound. Services to/from Rugeley Trent Valley call at Adderley Park. A limited service operates beyond Birmingham International towards Coventry and Northampton, mainly at peak times and the start/end of service.

On Sundays, there is an hourly service northbound to Rugeley and Birmingham New Street and southbound to Birmingham International with the first 4 and last 4 services of the day extending to Coventry, Northampton via Rugby or London Euston.

All services are operated by West Midlands Trains. Most services operate under the West Midlands Railway brand but some services (those which start/terminate at Northampton or Euston) operate under the London Northwestern Railway brand.

=== Platform usage ===
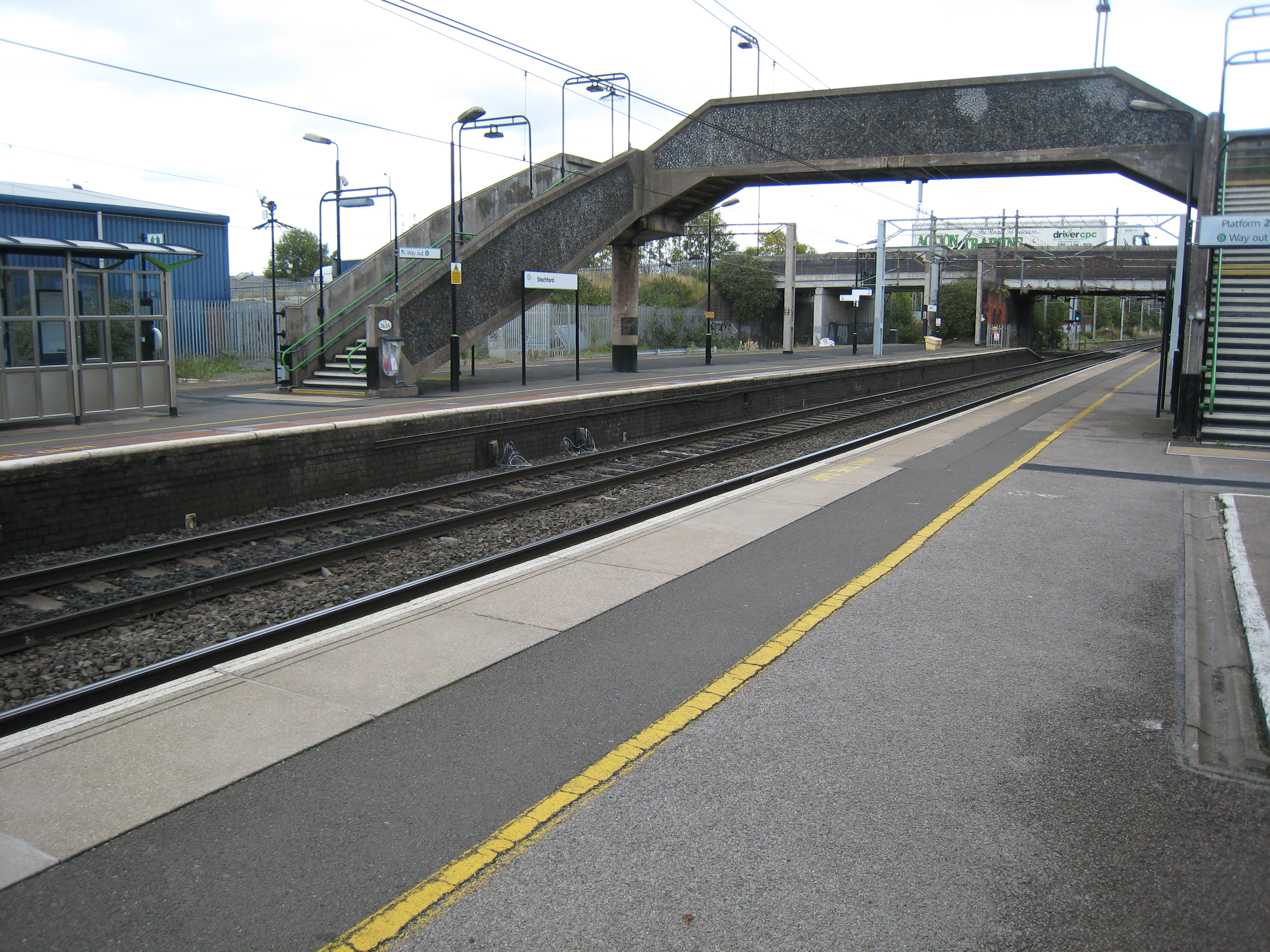
View from Platform 1 towards Platform 2, and beyond the defunct Platform 3

Platform 1 is used by services to Birmingham New Street most of which are services from Birmingham International to Walsall and Rugeley Trent Valley. Platform 2 is used by services to Birmingham International, Coventry, Northampton and London Euston. Platform 3 currently has no timetabled services. Up Walsall to Birmingham International trains formerly had a platform face of their own (platform 3), but down Birmingham International to Walsall trains used the up main platform via a facing crossover.

Preceding station	National Rail	Following station
Adderley Park	West Midlands Railway Rugeley Trent Valley - Birmingham New Street - Birmingham International	Lea Hall
Birmingham New Street	West Midlands Railway Rugeley Trent Valley - Birmingham New Street - Birmingham International	Lea Hall
Adderley Park towards Birmingham New Street	London Northwestern Railway London–Birmingham	Lea Hall towards London Euston
