= Highclare School =

Coordinates: 52°31′39″N 1°50′13″W

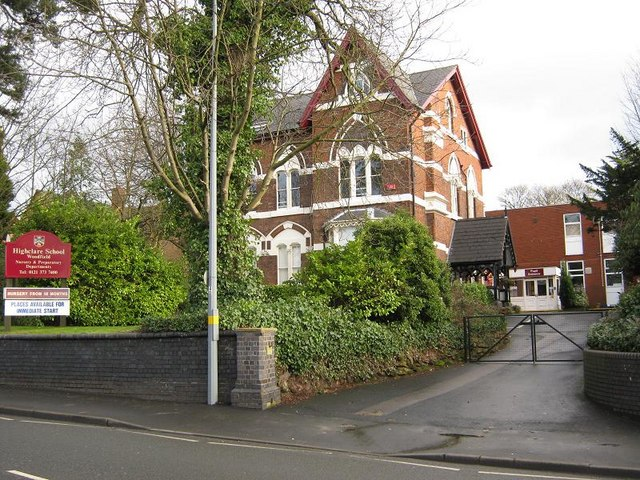

Location
- 10 Sutton Road; Birmingham, West Midlands, B23 6QL; England

Information
- Type: Other Independent School
- Motto: Facta Non Verba
- Established: 1957
- Local authority: 330 Birmingham
- Department for Education URN: 103576 Tables
- President: John Barrett
- Head teacher: Francine Smith
- Gender: Mixed
- Age: 2 to 19
- Enrolment: 524
- Capacity: 840
- Website: www.highclareschool.co.uk

Highclare School was founded in 1932 and is an independent primary, secondary school and sixth form on three sites in the Birmingham area, providing children's education from 2 to 19 years.

Two sites are in Sutton Coldfield, with the other in nearby Erdington. The Sutton Coldfield facilities are on the Lichfield Road in the Four Oaks area and in the Wylde Green area to the south, which houses the nursery.

== See also ==
- List of schools in Birmingham
