= Lea Hall =

Area of Birmingham, England

- Location within the West Midlands
- Metropolitan borough: Birmingham
- Metropolitan county: West Midlands
- Region: West Midlands
- Country: England
- Sovereign state: United Kingdom
- Post town: BIRMINGHAM
- Postcode district: B33
- Dialling code: 0121
- Police: West Midlands
- Fire: West Midlands
- Ambulance: West Midlands
- UK Parliament: Birmingham Hodge Hill and Solihull North

Lea Hall is an area in the east of Birmingham, England, bordering the Kitts Green and Garretts Green areas. It is historically in Worcestershire.

It is the location of Lea Hall railway station, which is served by West Midlands Trains. The local primary school is Lea Forest Academy School.

It should not be confused with Lea Hall (52.5169°N 1.9128°W), a building in nearby Handsworth, and its associated features, such as Lea Hall allotments.
