= Sheldon, West Midlands =

Area of Birmingham, England

Coordinates: 52.4500°N 1.7666°W

Sheldon
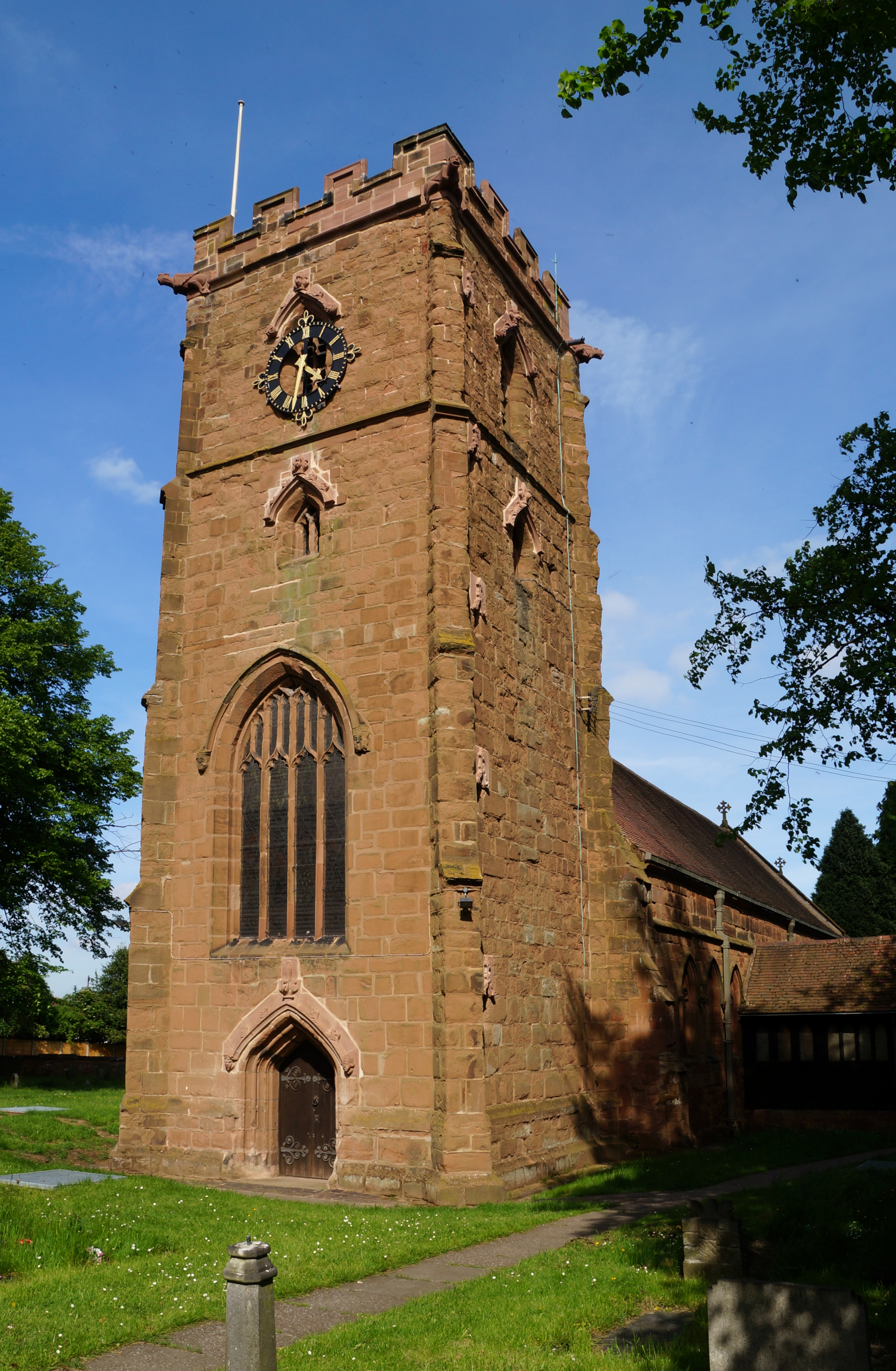
- St Giles' Church

- Location within the West Midlands
- Area: 2.3 sq mi (6.0 km^{2})
- Population: 21,817 (2011, ward)
  - Density: 9,486/sq mi (3,663/km^{2})
- OS grid reference: SP155845
- Metropolitan borough: Birmingham
- Metropolitan county: West Midlands
- Region: West Midlands
- Country: England
- Sovereign state: United Kingdom
- Post town: Birmingham
- Postcode district: B26
- Dialling code: 0121
- Police: West Midlands
- Fire: West Midlands
- Ambulance: West Midlands
- UK Parliament: Birmingham Yardley

Sheldon is an area of east Birmingham, England. Historically part of Warwickshire, it is close to the border with the Metropolitan Borough of Solihull and Birmingham Airport.

Sheldon is also one of the 69 electoral wards in Birmingham, and one of the four wards that make up the council constituency of Yardley. It covers an area of 2.3 square miles (6.0 km^{2}; 1,500 acres). Areas covered by the ward are Lyndon Green, Well's Green, Sheldon itself and part of Garrett's Green.

Sheldon was mentioned in the Domesday Book as Machitone, meaning "Macca's farm". A Mackadown Farm existed in the area until the First World War, however, it is only remembered through Mackadown Lane, a residential road.

The suburb is home to the 300 acre Sheldon Country Park, a popular local attraction.

== Population and housing ==
According to the 2001 UK census there were 20,129 people living in 9,140 households in Sheldon with a population density of 3,481 people per km^{2} compared with 3,649 people per km^{2} for Birmingham. Sheldon has a low percentage of ethnic minorities in its population with only 5.9% (1,195) being of an ethnic minority compared with 29.6% for Birmingham in general. The population had increased to 21,817 at the 2011 census.

Housing in the area primarily dates back to the 1930s. The area benefits from Sheldon Country Park which is adjacent to Birmingham International Airport and is served by numerous shops and businesses situated along the busy A45, Coventry Road. This road acts as one of the city's primary gateways from Coventry.

There are two secondary schools serving the area: Cockshut Hill School and King Edward VI Sheldon Heath Academy. There are five primary schools, one of which is Roman Catholic. Sheldon Library also serves the area.

== Politics ==
As of May 2026, the two councillors representing Sheldon Ward on Birmingham City Council are Darren Colling and Rachel Conaghan, both of Reform UK. The ward has adopted a Ward Support Officer.

=== Birmingham City Council Elections, 5 May 2022 – Sheldon Results ===
- Isra Abdi – Labour Party – 835
- Mark David Andrews – TUSC – 89
- Susan Axfrord – Conservative Party – 564
- Colin Green – Liberal Democrats – 1534
- Kevin Harrison – Green Party – 218
- Oliver Jenkins – Conservative Party – 513
- Joseph Piekarz – Labour Party – 743
- Paul Tilsley – Liberal Democrats – 1752

Candidates Elected – Paul Tilsley and Colin Green – Liberal Democrats

=== Birmingham City Council Elections, 4 May 2006 – Sheldon Results ===
- Robert Arthur Devenport – British National Party – 1132
- Derek Anthony Johnson – Conservative Party – 556
- Michael Johnson – Labour Party – 792
- Paul Morris – National Front – 74
- Colin Richard Preece – Legalise Cannabis Alliance – 45
- Michael Paul Sheridan – Green Party – 139
- Michael Howard Ward – Liberal Democrat – 3233

Candidate Elected – Michael Howard Ward – Liberal Democrat

== Notable residents ==
- Ian Smith, town planning expert, also lived in Cranes Park Road in the 1960s and '70s.
- Thomas Bray, founder of the Society for the Propagation of Christian Knowledge, was rector of Sheldon.
- Howard Brown, branch manager for the Halifax bank, won a staff competition to appear in their advertisements, was born and brought up in Sheldon.
- Kevin Warwick, professor of cybernetics lived there in the 1970s. In the latter part of this time he studied at Aston University.
- Andre Marriner, a Premier League football referee.
