= Kitts Green =

Area of Birmingham, England

Coordinates: 52°28′57″N 1°46′44″W

- Location within the West Midlands
- Metropolitan borough: Birmingham
- Metropolitan county: West Midlands
- Region: West Midlands
- Country: England
- Sovereign state: United Kingdom
- Post town: Birmingham
- Postcode district: B33
- Dialling code: 0121
- Police: West Midlands
- Fire: West Midlands
- Ambulance: West Midlands
- UK Parliament: Birmingham Hodge Hill

Kitts Green (Note: Despite sometimes written as "Kitt's Green", the official spelling is "Kitts Green".) is an area of Birmingham, England, approximately 5 miles east of the city centre and on the borders of Tile Cross, Lea Village, Lea Hall, and Garretts Green; it is located to the east of Stechford. Historically in Worcestershire, close to the border with Warwickshire, Kitts Green dates back to when it was first mentioned in 1495 whereas Lea Village is first documented in 1275.

Kitts Green is served by services 14 (Birmingham to Chelmsley Wood via Alum Rock), service A9 from Kingshurst and Ilshaw Heath and service 72 from Chelmsley Wood to Solihull and services 97 and 97A from Birmingham to Chelmsley Wood / Airport (97A) via Bordesley Green. Services 14, 72, 97 and 97A are operated by National Express West Midlands. Service A9 is operated by Stagecoach Midlands.

Roy Wood, co-founder of bands The Move, Electric Light Orchestra (ELO) and Wizzard, was born in Kitts Green in 1946.

Kitts Green was the site of BSA's research facility where David Garside developed the Norton Wankel rotary-engined motorcycles, such as the Norton Classic.
