= Birmingham Statistical Society =

English Statistical Society

- Birmingham Statistical Society for the Improvement of Education
- Formation: 1830s
- Type: Learned society / Statistical society
- Legal status: Historical (active until at least 1887)
- Purpose: Social research, tracking and improvement of education
- Location: Birmingham, England
- Region served: Birmingham

The Birmingham Statistical Society (or Birmingham Statistical Society for the Improvement of Education) was a society founded in Birmingham, England, in the 1830s. In 1839, it produced "a very accurate enquiry into the state of education in that town". It was still active as of 1887.
