= Waverley School, Birmingham =

Waverley all-through School

Location
- Yardley Green Road; Small Heath; Birmingham, West Midlands, B9 5QA; England; 52.4903°N 1.8193°W

Information
- Type: Academy
- Local authority: Birmingham
- Department for Education URN: 142219 Tables
- Ofsted: Reports
- Principal: Satnam Dosanjh (Primary)
- Principal: Hugh Derry (Secondary)
- Executive headteacher: Chris King (CEO)
- Gender: Mixed
- Age: 4 to 19
- Enrolment: 786
- Website: http://www.waverley.bham.sch.uk/

Waverley School is a mixed all-through school located in Small Heath, Birmingham, England.

== History ==
The co-educational Waverley Grammar School was situated between Byron Road and Waverley Road, now next to the A45–Muntz St (B4145) roundabout, and next to Small Heath Park. This school is now Small Heath Leadership Academy.

In 2006, Waverley was recognized as one of the most improved schools at GCSE level in England. The 2010 Ofsted inspection rated the school Outstanding.

The school has expanded in recent years to become an all-through school for primary, secondary and sixth form education. It is a member of the Waverley Education Foundation Trust, the CEO of which is Chris King. The CFO is Rital Sohal and the Director of School Improvement is Michael McCulley. The Director of Safeguarding and Attendance is Jennifer Copestake. The Trust also operates nearby Waverley Studio College, a 14-19 Studio school.

== Admissions ==
Waverley has a school-based nursery and also a boys and girls school for pupils age 4 - 19.

It is situated just south of Bordesley Green's Heartlands Hospital, between Hob Moor Road and Kingscliff Road.
