= Lea Hall railway station =

Railway station in the West Midlands, England

Lea Hall
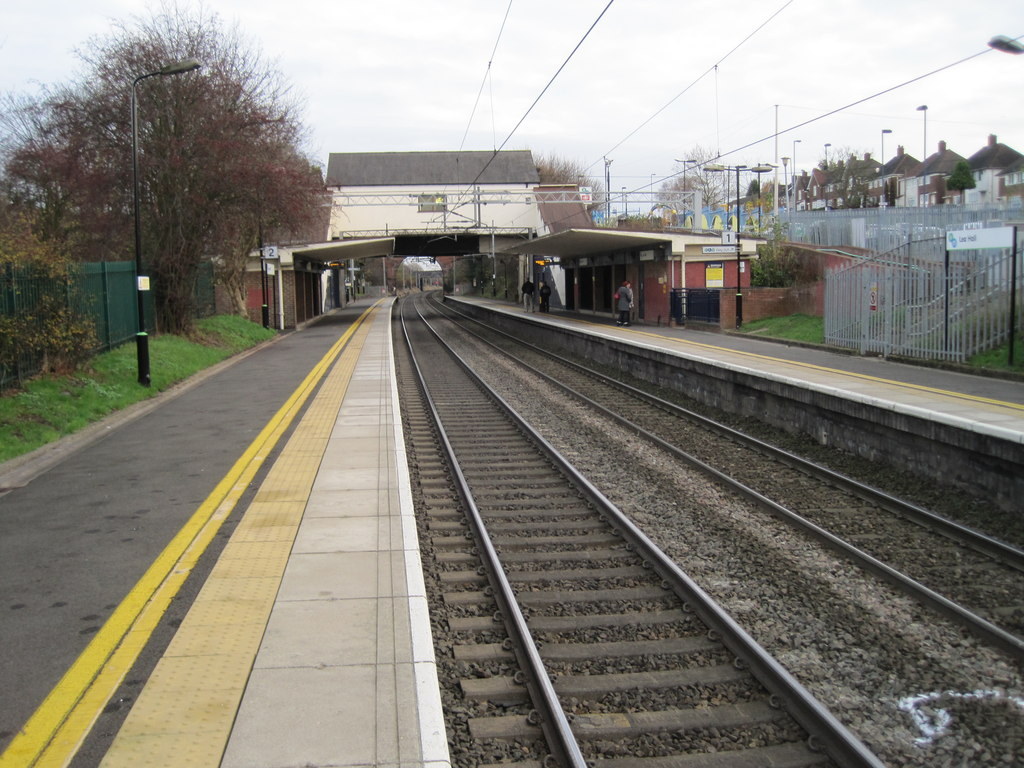

General information
- Location: Lea Hall, Birmingham; England
- Coordinates: 52.480°N 1.786°W
- Grid reference: SP145869
- Manager: West Midlands Railway
- Transit authority: Transport for West Midlands
- Platforms: 2

Other information
- Station code: LEH
- Fare zone: 3
- Classification: DfT category E

History
- Opened: 1939

Passengers
- 2021/22: ▲0.260 million
- 2022/23: ▲0.338 million
- 2023/24: ▲0.410 million
- 2024/25: ▲0.443 million
- 2025/26: ▲0.521 million
Location
Notes
- Passenger statistics from the Office of Rail and Road

Lea Hall railway station is situated in the Lea Hall area east of the city of Birmingham, in the West Midlands of England. It has two platforms, one each side of the two running lines, with no points or sidings. The ticket office is on a bridge over the tracks, which are a little below street level. The station, and all trains serving it, are operated by West Midlands Trains. Ramps have been added to permit easy disabled access to both platforms.

== History ==
The station was designed by the architect William Henry Hamlyn and opened in 1939.

In 1998 the station was re-designed with new sculptures and colour scheme by Tim Tolkien, great nephew of writer J. R. R. Tolkien.

== Facilities ==
The station has a ticket office located on the bridge over the tracks which is open Monday-Thursday 07:15-19:00, Friday 07:00-20:00, Saturday 08:00-20:00 and Sunday 11:00-14:00. When the ticket office is open tickets must be purchased before boarding the train. Outside of these times there is a ticket machine above platform 1 which accepts card payments only - cash and voucher payments can be made to the senior conductor on the train.

There is a free car park for rail users on Lea Hall Road.

Step free access is available between the platforms via the ramp.

== Services ==
Lea Hall is served by two trains per hour, westbound to Rugeley Trent Valley via Birmingham New Street and to Birmingham International eastbound. A limited service operates beyond Birmingham International towards Coventry and Northampton mainly at peak times and the start/end of service.

On Sundays, there is an hourly service westbound to Birmingham New Street and eastbound to Birmingham International with the first 4 and last 4 services extending to Coventry, Northampton via Rugby or London Euston.

All services are operated by West Midlands Trains. Most services operate under the West Midlands Railway brand but some services (those which start/terminate at Northampton or Euston) operate under the London Northwestern Railway brand.

Preceding station	National Rail	Following station
Stechford	West Midlands Railway; Rugeley Trent Valley/Birmingham New Street-Birmingham International	Marston Green
Stechford towards Birmingham New Street	London Northwestern Railway London–Birmingham	Marston Green towards London Euston
