= Tile Cross =

Area of Birmingham, England

Coordinates: 52.47709°N 1.76439°W

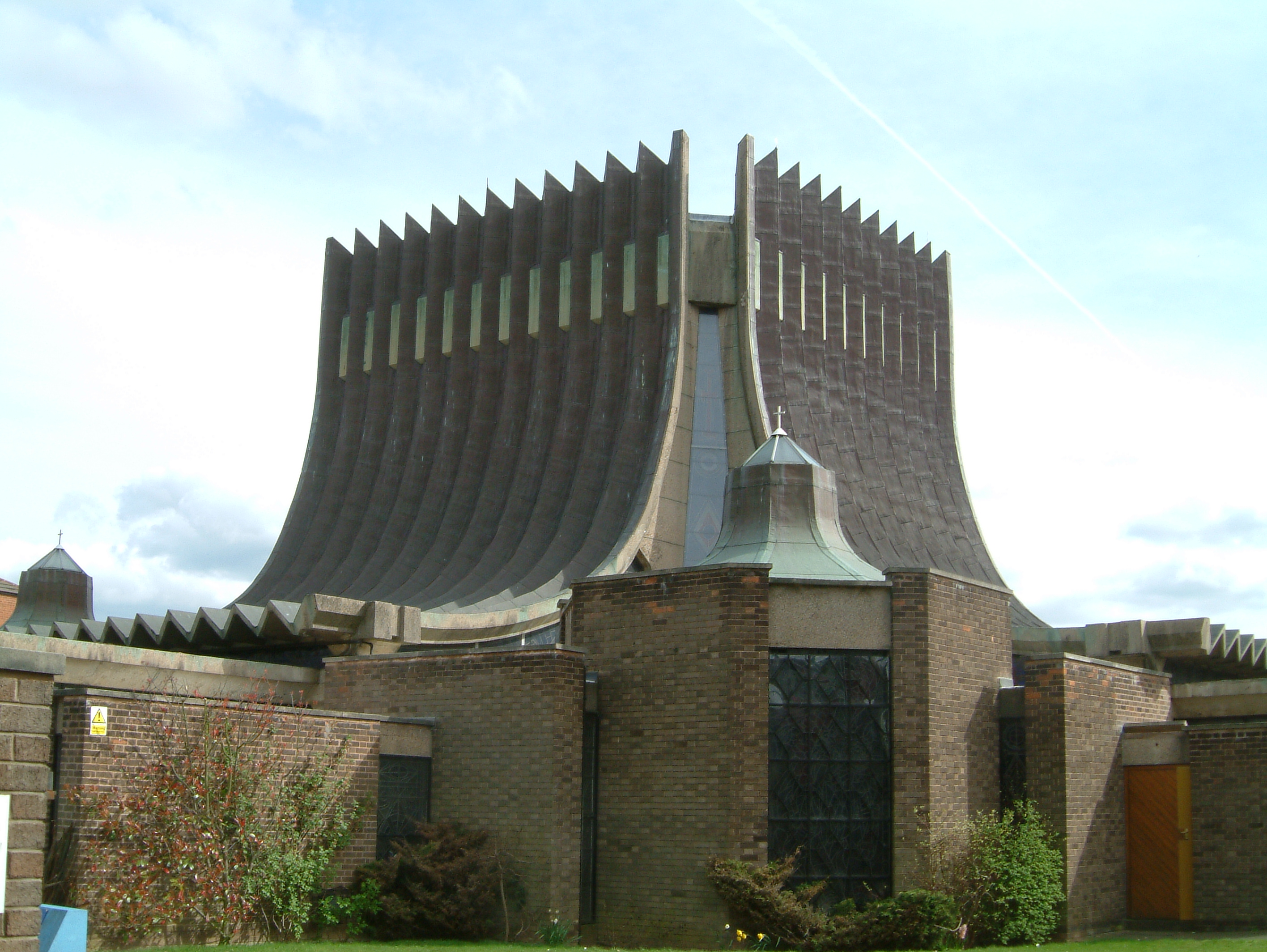
- Our Lady Help of Christians Catholic Church

- Location within the West Midlands
- OS grid reference: SP161866
- Metropolitan borough: Birmingham
- Metropolitan county: West Midlands
- Region: West Midlands
- Country: England
- Sovereign state: United Kingdom
- Post town: Birmingham
- Postcode district: B33
- Dialling code: 0121
- Police: West Midlands
- Fire: West Midlands
- Ambulance: West Midlands
- UK Parliament: Birmingham Hodge Hill

Tile Cross is an area in the east of the city of Birmingham, England. It lies within the historic county of Warwickshire, near its border with Worcestershire.

It is a small area with a shopping centre on the borders of Stechford, Kitts Green, Marston Green and the Radleys. The name originates from the tile production at the former quarry that existed on what is now parkland between St Peter's C of E Church and Shirestone School. Landmarks in the area include Our Lady Help of Christians Catholic Church, a grade II listed building, which has an associated primary school, and nearby Sheldon Hall, a grade II* listed building.
