= Birmingham Ormiston Academy =

BOA Creative, Digital, Performing Arts Academy
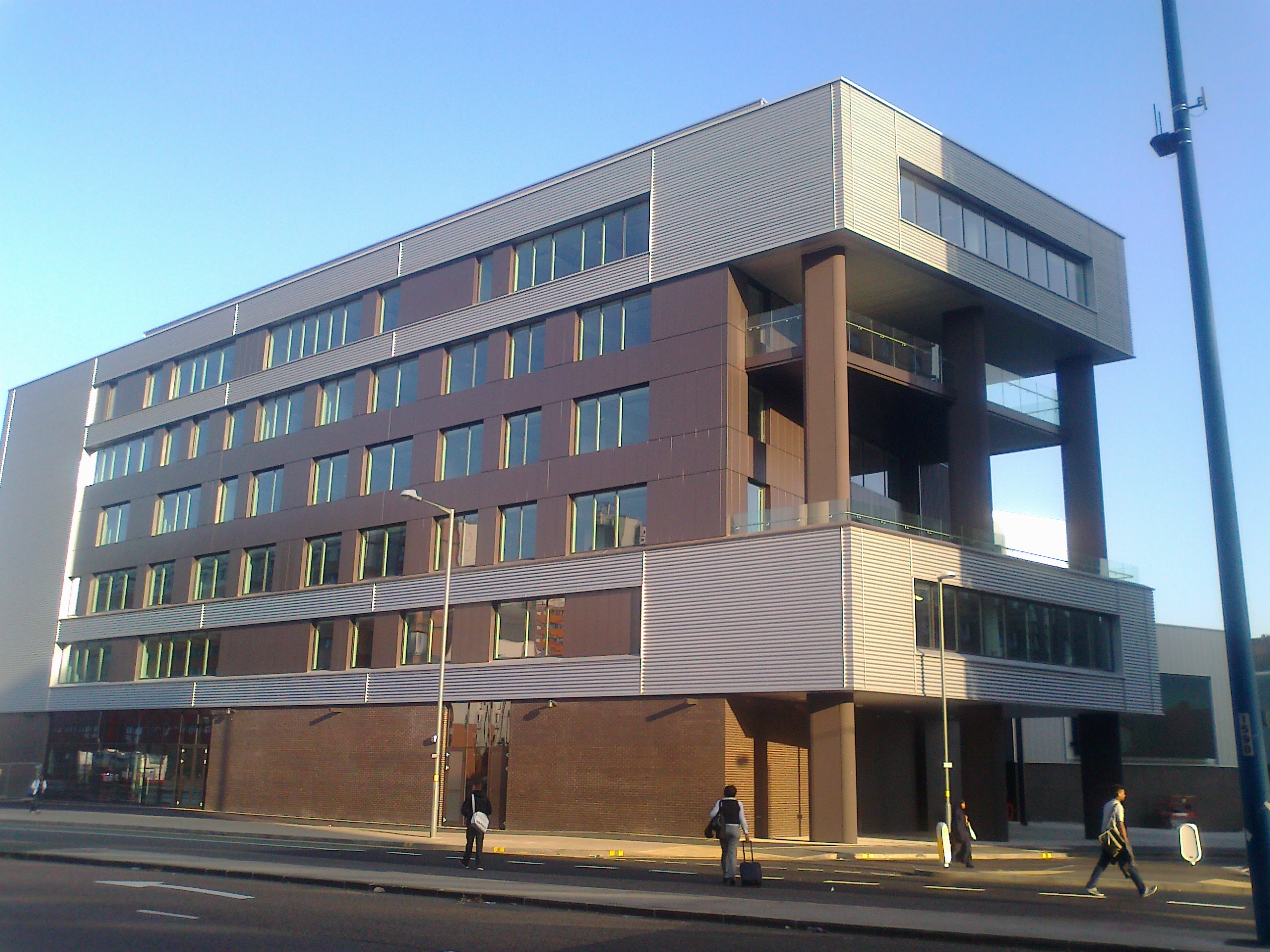

Location
- 1 Grovesnor Street; Birmingham, B4 7QD; England
- 52.4831°N 1.8874°W

Information
- Type: Academy
- Motto: Imagine Everything
- Trust: BOA Group
- Department for Education URN: 136944 Tables
- Ofsted: Reports
- Principal: Alistair Chattaway
- Gender: Coeducational
- Age: 14 to 19
- Website: www.boa-academy.co.uk

BOA Creative, Digital, Performing Arts Academy (BOA) is a regional academy for digital, creative and performing arts located in the centre of Birmingham, England.

BOA Creative, Digital, Performing Arts Academy is an independent state-funded academy for 14- to 19-year-olds, with a curriculum designed for those with talents in the specialist subjects. Their motto is "Imagine Everything". Applicants select a pathway, which will occupy the majority of the curriculum time (16 hours); additional subjects and programmes are also available.

The academy admits students from Birmingham, the surrounding metropolitan boroughs, and the wider West Midlands region. The school is sponsored by Ormiston Trust and Birmingham City University, and is partnered with Maverick TV, Birmingham Repertory Theatre and the BRIT School, and has also been unofficially referred to as the BRIT school in Birmingham.

From September 2014 to August 2024, BOA took over the running of the Old Rep Theatre on Station Street in Birmingham. The venue was re-launched on 4 September 2014 with a performance showcasing the skills of their students. Amateur and professional companies will still be able to perform at the theatre as well as the school using the venue for lessons, rehearsal space and performances.

== Entry ==
Entry to any pathway is initially by application, then if applicants meet the initial entry criteria, they will be invited to an aptitude workshop for their chosen pathway at the school. The pathways offered are Dance, Acting, Musical Theatre, Music, Music Technology, Art and Design, Games Development and New Media, and Broadcast and Production. Admission onto a pathway is considered based on the applicant's aptitude for their chosen pathway. For Post 16 students, once they have been accepted onto their chosen pathway, they are encouraged to choose an additional subject to study at A-Level. However, acceptance onto these courses depends on the future student's GCSE results.
