= Stechford and Yardley North (ward) =

Coordinates: 52.4772°N 1.8078°W

Stechford and Yardley North ward
- Ward
- Location within the West Midlands
- Population: 25,757 (2011.Ward)
  - Density: 54.8 per ha
- OS grid reference: SP130866
- Metropolitan borough: Birmingham
- Metropolitan county: West Midlands
- Region: West Midlands
- Country: England
- Sovereign state: United Kingdom
- Post town: BIRMINGHAM
- Postcode district: B25
- Dialling code: 0121
- Police: West Midlands
- Fire: West Midlands
- Ambulance: West Midlands
- UK Parliament: Birmingham Yardley

Stechford and Yardley North is one of the 40 electoral wards in Birmingham, England.

Stechford and Yardley North is one of the four wards that make up the council constituency of Yardley. It covers an area of 4.4 square kilometres.

East Yardley, part of Garretts Green, Glebe Farm, Old Yardley Village, Poolway, Stechford including Stechford Village and Whittington Oval Estate are areas all covered by the ward.

== Population ==
According to the 2001 Population Census there were 22,976 people living in 10,001 households in Stechford and Yardley North with a population density of 5,170 people per km^{2} compared with 3,649 people per km^{2} for Birmingham. 15.1% (3,458) of the ward's population consists of ethnic minorities compared with 29.6% for Birmingham in general. The population of the ward as taken at the 2011 census had increased to 25,757.

== Politics ==
As of 2005, the three councillors representing Stechford and Yardley North on Birmingham City Council are Neil Eustace, Barbara Jackson and Carol Jones, all of the Liberal Democrat Party.

The ward has adopted a Ward Support Officer, with the current holder of the title being Osaf Ahmed.

== Places of interest ==
The ward is served by two libraries; Kents Moat and Glebe Farm libraries. There are numerous areas of open space and recreation grounds.

There is one secondary school, one nursery school and five primary schools located in Stechford and Yardley North.

Stechford railway station and Lea Hall railway station both serve the ward.

=== Sport ===
Stechford Cascades is a swimming facility in Stechford with an adjacent gym. Sheldon Marlborough Cricket Club, a privately managed cricket club, is located within the boundaries. Sedgmere Sports and Social Club and Co-op Sports and Social Club, two privately managed sports and social clubs are located within the boundaries.

Stechford Football Club was created through funding from the Neighbourhood Renewal Fund.

== Ward description ==
The ward covers an area of {} Birmingham, including the districts of {}.

== Ward history ==
The ward was created in {}, with the boundaries being unaltered until {}.

== Parliamentary representation ==
The ward has been part of Birmingham {} constituency.

== Election results ==
Extended content

=== 2000s ===
6 May 2010 Electorate Turnout %,
Party	Candidate	Votes	%	±%
Conservative			%	
Labour			%	
Liberal			%	
Independent			%	
Majority			%	
Labour gain from Liberal		Swing		
Conservative hold		Swing		

7 May 2009 Electorate Turnout %,
Party	Candidate	Votes	%	±%
Conservative			%	
Labour			%	
Liberal			%	
Independent			%	
Majority			%	
Labour gain from Liberal		Swing		
Conservative hold		Swing		

1 May 2008 Electorate Turnout %,
Party	Candidate	Votes	%	±%
Conservative			%	
Labour			%	
Liberal			%	
Independent			%	
Majority			%	
Labour gain from Liberal		Swing		
Conservative hold		Swing		

3 May 2007 Electorate Turnout %,
Party	Candidate	Votes	%	±%
Conservative			%	
Labour			%	
Liberal			%	
Independent			%	
Majority			%	
Labour gain from Liberal		Swing		
Conservative hold		Swing		

4 May 2006 Electorate Turnout %,
Party	Candidate	Votes	%	±%
Conservative			%	
Labour			%	
Liberal			%	
Independent			%	
Majority			%	
Labour gain from Liberal		Swing		
Conservative hold		Swing		

5 May 2005 Electorate Turnout %,
Party	Candidate	Votes	%	±%
Conservative			%	
Labour			%	
Liberal			%	
Independent			%	
Majority			%	
Labour gain from Liberal		Swing		
Conservative hold		Swing		

6 May 2004 Electorate Turnout %,
Party	Candidate	Votes	%	±%
Conservative			%	
Labour			%	
Liberal			%	
Independent			%	
Majority			%	
Labour gain from Liberal		Swing		
Conservative hold		Swing		

1 May 2003 Electorate Turnout %,
Party	Candidate	Votes	%	±%
Conservative			%	
Labour			%	
Liberal			%	
Independent			%	
Majority			%	
Labour gain from Liberal		Swing		
Conservative hold		Swing		

2 May 2002 Electorate Turnout %,
Party	Candidate	Votes	%	±%
Conservative			%	
Labour			%	
Liberal			%	
Independent			%	
Majority			%	
Labour gain from Liberal		Swing		
Conservative hold		Swing		

7 June 2001 Electorate Turnout %,
Party	Candidate	Votes	%	±%
Conservative			%	
Labour			%	
Liberal			%	
Independent			%	
Majority			%	
Labour gain from Liberal		Swing		
Conservative hold		Swing		

4 May 2000 Electorate Turnout %,
Party	Candidate	Votes	%	±%
Conservative			%	
Labour			%	
Liberal			%	
Independent			%	
Majority			%	
Labour gain from Liberal		Swing		
Conservative hold		Swing		

=== 1990s ===
6 May 1999 Electorate Turnout %,
Party	Candidate	Votes	%	±%
Conservative			%	
Labour			%	
Liberal			%	
Independent			%	
Majority			%	
Labour gain from Liberal		Swing		
Conservative hold		Swing		

7 May 1998 Electorate Turnout %,
Party	Candidate	Votes	%	±%
Conservative			%	
Labour			%	
Liberal			%	
Independent			%	
Majority			%	
Labour gain from Liberal		Swing		
Conservative hold		Swing		

1 May 1997 Electorate Turnout %,
Party	Candidate	Votes	%	±%
Conservative			%	
Labour			%	
Liberal			%	
Independent			%	
Majority			%	
Labour gain from Liberal		Swing		
Conservative hold		Swing		

2 May 1996 Electorate Turnout %,
Party	Candidate	Votes	%	±%
Conservative			%	
Labour			%	
Liberal			%	
Independent			%	
Majority			%	
Labour gain from Liberal		Swing		
Conservative hold		Swing		

4 May 1995 Electorate Turnout %,
Party	Candidate	Votes	%	±%
Conservative			%	
Labour			%	
Liberal			%	
Independent			%	
Majority			%	
Labour gain from Liberal		Swing		
Conservative hold		Swing		

5 May 1994 Electorate Turnout %,
Party	Candidate	Votes	%	±%
Conservative			%	
Labour			%	
Liberal			%	
Independent			%	
Majority			%	
Labour gain from Liberal		Swing		
Conservative hold		Swing		

6 May 1993 Electorate Turnout %,
Party	Candidate	Votes	%	±%
Conservative			%	
Labour			%	
Liberal			%	
Independent			%	
Majority			%	
Labour gain from Liberal		Swing		
Conservative hold		Swing		

7 May 1992 Electorate Turnout %,
Party	Candidate	Votes	%	±%
Conservative			%	
Labour			%	
Liberal			%	
Independent			%	
Majority			%	
Labour gain from Liberal		Swing		
Conservative hold		Swing		

2 May 1991 Electorate Turnout %,
Party	Candidate	Votes	%	±%
Conservative			%	
Labour			%	
Liberal			%	
Independent			%	
Majority			%	
Labour gain from Liberal		Swing		
Conservative hold		Swing		

3 May 1990 Electorate Turnout %,
Party	Candidate	Votes	%	±%
Conservative			%	
Labour			%	
Liberal			%	
Independent			%	
Majority			%	
Labour gain from Liberal		Swing		
Conservative hold		Swing		

=== 1980s ===
4 May 1989 Electorate Turnout %,
Party	Candidate	Votes	%	±%
Conservative			%	
Labour			%	
Liberal			%	
Independent			%	
Majority			%	
Labour gain from Liberal		Swing		
Conservative hold		Swing		

5 May 1988 Electorate Turnout %,
Party	Candidate	Votes	%	±%
Conservative			%	
Labour			%	
Liberal			%	
Independent			%	
Majority			%	
Labour gain from Liberal		Swing		
Conservative hold		Swing		

7 May 1987 Electorate Turnout %,
Party	Candidate	Votes	%	±%
Conservative			%	
Labour			%	
Liberal			%	
Independent			%	
Majority			%	
Labour gain from Liberal		Swing		
Conservative hold		Swing		

1 May 1986 Electorate Turnout %,
Party	Candidate	Votes	%	±%
Conservative			%	
Labour			%	
Liberal			%	
Independent			%	
Majority			%	
Labour gain from Liberal		Swing		
Conservative hold		Swing		

2 May 1985 Electorate Turnout %,
Party	Candidate	Votes	%	±%
Conservative			%	
Labour			%	
Liberal			%	
Independent			%	
Majority			%	
Labour gain from Liberal		Swing		
Conservative hold		Swing		

3 May 1984 Electorate Turnout %,
Party	Candidate	Votes	%	±%
Conservative			%	
Labour			%	
Liberal			%	
Independent			%	
Majority			%	
Labour gain from Liberal		Swing		
Conservative hold		Swing		

5 May 1983 Electorate Turnout %,
Party	Candidate	Votes	%	±%
Conservative			%	
Labour			%	
Liberal			%	
Independent			%	
Majority			%	
Labour gain from Liberal		Swing		
Conservative hold		Swing		

6 May 1982 Electorate Turnout %,
Party	Candidate	Votes	%	±%
Conservative			%	
Labour			%	
Liberal			%	
Independent			%	
Majority			%	
Labour gain from Liberal		Swing		
Conservative hold		Swing		

7 May 1981 Electorate Turnout %,
Party	Candidate	Votes	%	±%
Conservative			%	
Labour			%	
Liberal			%	
Independent			%	
Majority			%	
Labour gain from Liberal		Swing		
Conservative hold		Swing		

1 May 1980 Electorate Turnout %,
Party	Candidate	Votes	%	±%
Conservative			%	
Labour			%	
Liberal			%	
Independent			%	
Majority			%	
Labour gain from Liberal		Swing		
Conservative hold		Swing		

=== 1970s ===
3 May 1979 Electorate Turnout %,
Party	Candidate	Votes	%	±%
Conservative			%	
Labour			%	
Liberal			%	
Independent			%	
Majority			%	
Labour gain from Liberal		Swing		
Conservative hold		Swing		

4 May 1978 Electorate Turnout %,
Party	Candidate	Votes	%	±%
Conservative			%	
Labour			%	
Liberal			%	
Independent			%	
Majority			%	
Labour gain from Liberal		Swing		
Conservative hold		Swing		

5 May 1977 Electorate Turnout %,
Party	Candidate	Votes	%	±%
Conservative			%	
Labour			%	
Liberal			%	
Independent			%	
Majority			%	
Labour gain from Liberal		Swing		
Conservative hold		Swing		

6 May 1976 Electorate Turnout %,
Party	Candidate	Votes	%	±%
Conservative			%	
Labour			%	
Liberal			%	
Independent			%	
Majority			%	
Labour gain from Liberal		Swing		
Conservative hold		Swing		

1 May 1975 Electorate Turnout %,
Party	Candidate	Votes	%	±%
Conservative			%	
Labour			%	
Liberal			%	
Independent			%	
Majority			%	
Labour gain from Liberal		Swing		
Conservative hold		Swing		

2 May 1974 Electorate Turnout %,
Party	Candidate	Votes	%	±%
Conservative			%	
Labour			%	
Liberal			%	
Independent			%	
Majority			%	
Labour gain from Liberal		Swing		
Conservative hold		Swing		

3 May 1973 Electorate Turnout %,
Party	Candidate	Votes	%	±%
Conservative			%	
Labour			%	
Liberal			%	
Independent			%	
Majority			%	
Labour gain from Liberal		Swing		
Conservative hold		Swing		

4 May 1972 Electorate Turnout %,
Party	Candidate	Votes	%	±%
Conservative			%	
Labour			%	
Liberal			%	
Independent			%	
Majority			%	
Labour gain from Liberal		Swing		
Conservative hold		Swing		

13 May 1971 Electorate Turnout %,
Party	Candidate	Votes	%	±%
Conservative			%	
Labour			%	
Liberal			%	
Independent			%	
Majority			%	
Labour gain from Liberal		Swing		
Conservative hold		Swing		

7 May 1970 Electorate Turnout %,
Party	Candidate	Votes	%	±%
Conservative			%	
Labour			%	
Liberal			%	
Independent			%	
Majority			%	
Labour gain from Liberal		Swing		
Conservative hold		Swing		

=== 1960s ===
8 May 1969 Electorate Turnout %,
Party	Candidate	Votes	%	±%
Conservative			%	
Labour			%	
Liberal			%	
Independent			%	
Majority			%	
Labour gain from Liberal		Swing		
Conservative hold		Swing		

9 May 1968 Electorate Turnout %,
Party	Candidate	Votes	%	±%
Conservative			%	
Labour			%	
Liberal			%	
Independent			%	
Majority			%	
Labour gain from Liberal		Swing		
Conservative hold		Swing		

11 May 1967 Electorate Turnout %,
Party	Candidate	Votes	%	±%
Conservative			%	
Labour			%	
Liberal			%	
Independent			%	
Majority			%	
Labour gain from Liberal		Swing		
Conservative hold		Swing		

12 May 1966 Electorate Turnout %,
Party	Candidate	Votes	%	±%
Conservative			%	
Labour			%	
Liberal			%	
Independent			%	
Majority			%	
Labour gain from Liberal		Swing		
Conservative hold		Swing		

13 May 1965 Electorate Turnout %,
Party	Candidate	Votes	%	±%
Conservative			%	
Labour			%	
Liberal			%	
Independent			%	
Majority			%	
Labour gain from Liberal		Swing		
Conservative hold		Swing		

7 May 1964 Electorate Turnout %,
Party	Candidate	Votes	%	±%
Conservative			%	
Labour			%	
Liberal			%	
Independent			%	
Majority			%	
Labour gain from Liberal		Swing		
Conservative hold		Swing		

9 May 1963 Electorate Turnout %,
Party	Candidate	Votes	%	±%
Conservative			%	
Labour			%	
Liberal			%	
Independent			%	
Majority			%	
Labour gain from Liberal		Swing		
Conservative hold		Swing		

10 May 1962 Electorate Turnout %,
Party	Candidate	Votes	%	±%
Conservative			%	
Labour			%	
Liberal			%	
Independent			%	
Majority			%	
Labour gain from Liberal		Swing		
Conservative hold		Swing		

11 May 1961 Electorate Turnout %,
Party	Candidate	Votes	%	±%
Conservative			%	
Labour			%	
Liberal			%	
Independent			%	
Majority			%	
Labour gain from Liberal		Swing		
Conservative hold		Swing		

12 May 1960 Electorate Turnout %,
Party	Candidate	Votes	%	±%
Conservative			%	
Labour			%	
Liberal			%	
Independent			%	
Majority			%	
Labour gain from Liberal		Swing		
Conservative hold		Swing		

=== 1950s ===
14 May 1959 Electorate Turnout %,
Party	Candidate	Votes	%	±%
Conservative			%	
Labour			%	
Liberal			%	
Independent			%	
Majority			%	
Labour gain from Liberal		Swing		
Conservative hold		Swing		

8 May 1958 Electorate Turnout %,
Party	Candidate	Votes	%	±%
Conservative			%	
Labour			%	
Liberal			%	
Independent			%	
Majority			%	
Labour gain from Liberal		Swing		
Conservative hold		Swing		

9 May 1957 Electorate Turnout %,
Party	Candidate	Votes	%	±%
Conservative			%	
Labour			%	
Liberal			%	
Independent			%	
Majority			%	
Labour gain from Liberal		Swing		
Conservative hold		Swing		

10 May 1956 Electorate Turnout %,
Party	Candidate	Votes	%	±%
Conservative			%	
Labour			%	
Liberal			%	
Independent			%	
Majority			%	
Labour gain from Liberal		Swing		
Conservative hold		Swing		

12 May 1955 Electorate Turnout %,
Party	Candidate	Votes	%	±%
Conservative			%	
Labour			%	
Liberal			%	
Independent			%	
Majority			%	
Labour gain from Liberal		Swing		
Conservative hold		Swing		

13 May 1954 Electorate Turnout %,
Party	Candidate	Votes	%	±%
Conservative			%	
Labour			%	
Liberal			%	
Independent			%	
Majority			%	
Labour gain from Liberal		Swing		
Conservative hold		Swing		

7 May 1953 Electorate Turnout %,
Party	Candidate	Votes	%	±%
Conservative			%	
Labour			%	
Liberal			%	
Independent			%	
Majority			%	
Labour gain from Liberal		Swing		
Conservative hold		Swing		

8 May 1952 Electorate Turnout %,
Party	Candidate	Votes	%	±%
Conservative			%	
Labour			%	
Liberal			%	
Independent			%	
Majority			%	
Labour gain from Liberal		Swing		
Conservative hold		Swing		

10 May 1951 Electorate Turnout %,
Party	Candidate	Votes	%	±%
Conservative			%	
Labour			%	
Liberal			%	
Independent			%	
Majority			%	
Labour gain from Liberal		Swing		
Conservative hold		Swing		

11 May 1950 Electorate Turnout %,
Party	Candidate	Votes	%	±%
Conservative			%	
Labour			%	
Liberal			%	
Independent			%	
Majority			%	
Labour gain from Liberal		Swing		
Conservative hold		Swing		

=== 1940s ===
12 May 1949 Electorate Turnout %,
Party	Candidate	Votes	%	±%
Conservative			%	
Labour			%	
Liberal			%	
Independent			%	
Majority			%	
Labour gain from Liberal		Swing		
Conservative hold		Swing		

1 November 1947 Electorate Turnout %,
Party	Candidate	Votes	%	±%
Conservative			%	
Labour			%	
Liberal			%	
Independent			%	
Majority			%	
Labour gain from Liberal		Swing		
Conservative hold		Swing		

2 November 1946 Electorate Turnout %,
Party	Candidate	Votes	%	±%
Conservative			%	
Labour			%	
Liberal			%	
Independent			%	
Majority			%	
Labour gain from Liberal		Swing		
Conservative hold		Swing		

3 November 1945 Electorate Turnout %,
Party	Candidate	Votes	%	±%
Conservative			%	
Labour			%	
Liberal			%	
Independent			%	
Majority			%	
Labour gain from Liberal		Swing		
Conservative hold		Swing		
