= Starbank School =

Coordinates: 52.4702°N 1.8323°W

Location
- Starbank Road, Hobmoor Road; Birmingham, West Midlands, B10 9LR, B10 9BT, B25 8PY; England

Information
- Type: Academy
- Local authority: Birmingham City Council
- Trust: Star Academies
- Department for Education URN: 147757 Tables
- Ofsted: Reports
- Gender: Co-educational
- Age: 3 to 16
- Colours: Red, Black, Grey
- Website: http://www.starbankschool.co.uk/

Starbank School is a co-educational all-through school. The school is located over three sites that are close to the boundaries of Bordesley Green, Small Heath, and Yardley in Birmingham, West Midlands, England.

Originally a primary school for pupils aged up to 11, Starbank School started accepting secondary school age pupils in September 2014. The school had a full age range of pupils ages 4 to 16 from September 2018. The school is located over three sites. The original site on Starbank Road houses primary school age pupils, as does the newest site on Bierton Road. The site on Hob Moor Road was relocated to a new site on the same road in September 2016 and this new site accommodates primary school age pupils as well as secondary school age pupils.

Previously a community school administered by Birmingham City Council, in October 2020 Starbank School converted to academy status. The school is now sponsored by Star Academies.
