= Blakesley School =

Blakesley School may refer to the following primary schools in England, UK:

- Blakesley School, a defunct private school in Worcester Park, Surrey
- Blakesley Church of England Primary School, a voluntary controlled school in Blakesley, Northamptonshire
- Blakesley Hall Primary School, a state school near Blakesley Hall in Yardley, Birmingham
