= Sparkhill =

Inner-city area of Birmingham, England

Coordinates: 52.45046°N 1.86416°W

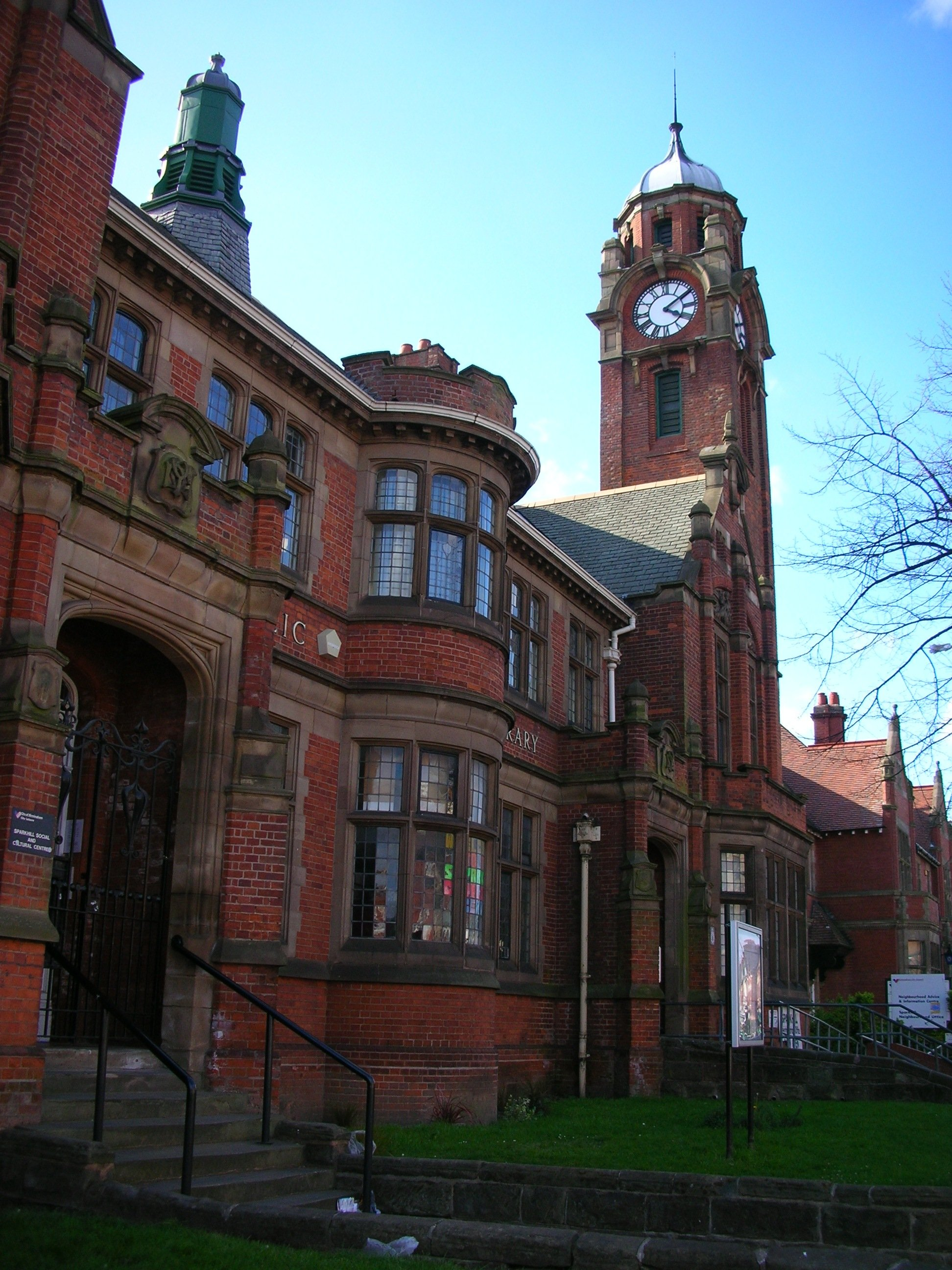
Sparkhill Library

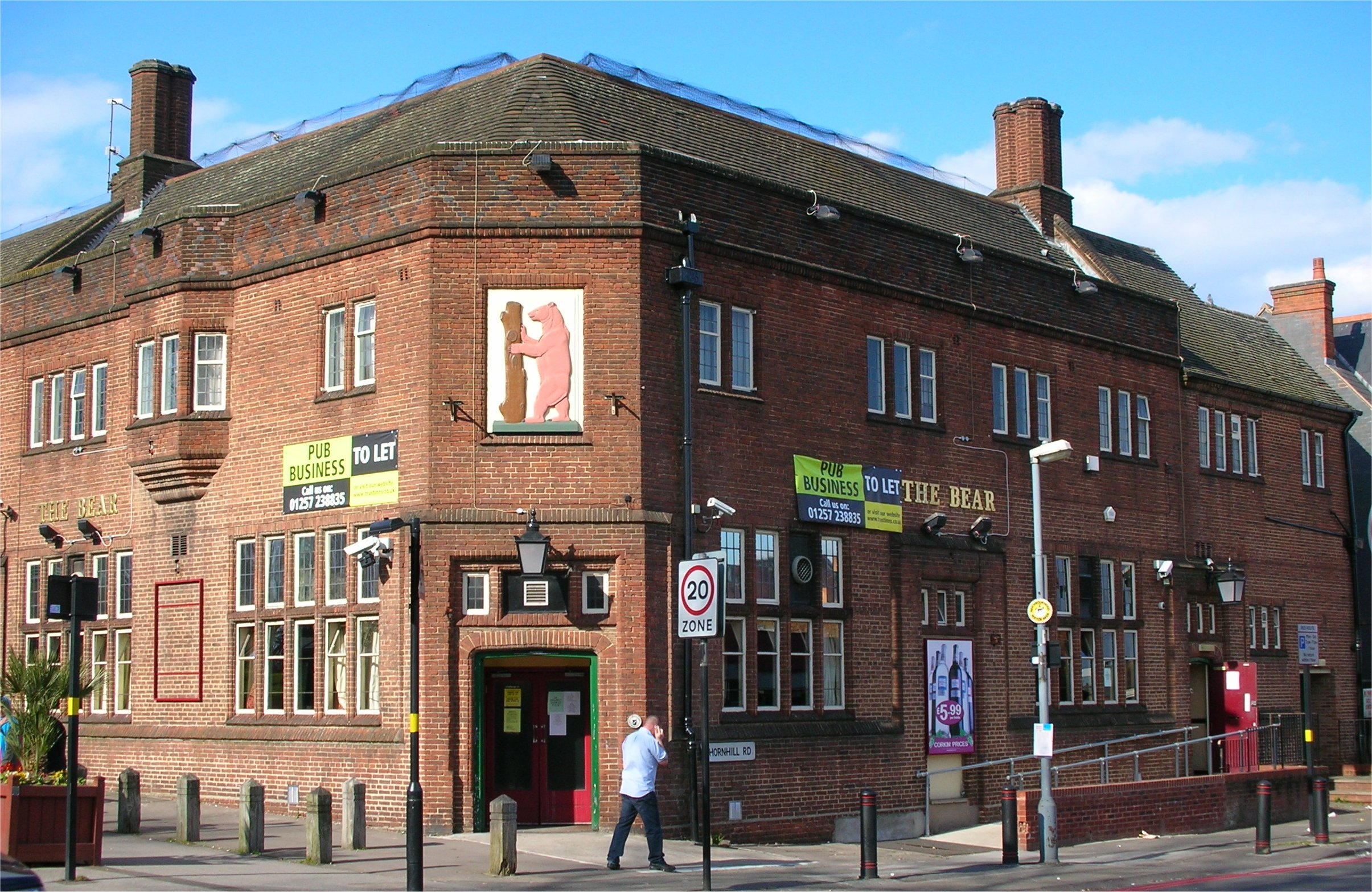
The Bear public house, Holland W. Hobbiss & William Bloye

Sparkhill is an inner-city area of Birmingham, England, situated between Springfield, Hall Green and Sparkbrook. Historically part of Worcestershire, Sparkhill once existed as a rural area with its main industry being agriculture until the 1880s.

== History ==
=== The Sparke family ===
In the Middle Ages, the Sparke family farmed in the area, although it can be posited that Sparkhill takes its name from Spark Brook, a small stream that flows from Moseley to the River Cole in Small Heath. It was, as the name suggests, a hill that was situated alongside the stream. The watercourse can be traced almost entirely along its length from source to where it joins the River Tame, although most of its tributaries are now culverted, and is a popular route for leisure walkers and cyclists. The only part where it cannot easily be followed is a short tunnel where it passes under the Grand Union Canal, very close to the old BSA motorcycle factory near Golden Hillock Road. Most of the route is accessible through Ackers Trust artificial ski slope and sports centre, which was built on BSA's old test track. This part of the route is still used for off-road cycling and similar pursuits.

=== The Cherry Arbour ===
As a result of the Industrial Revolution which was causing Birmingham to expand, development of the area began. In the 1850s, a small area of land was bought by a building society and sold to separate developers who built houses for the working class. People who owned a property were entitled to vote and a campaigner for the working class vote was Joseph Sturge, a Birmingham manufacturer. As a result of his campaigning, a newly created street in the area was named after him. The architecture of the houses was varied due to the different developers. A centre began to develop for the area with its own pub, The Cherry Arbour. In the late 1860s, developments appeared all over Sparkhill with the creation of long, straight streets forming a uniform pattern. The new houses were terraced with their own back garden, coal shed and lavatory. For the wealthy middle class, larger houses were built in a plot bounded by Stoney Lane, Alfred Road, and Durham Road.

=== Annexation by Birmingham ===
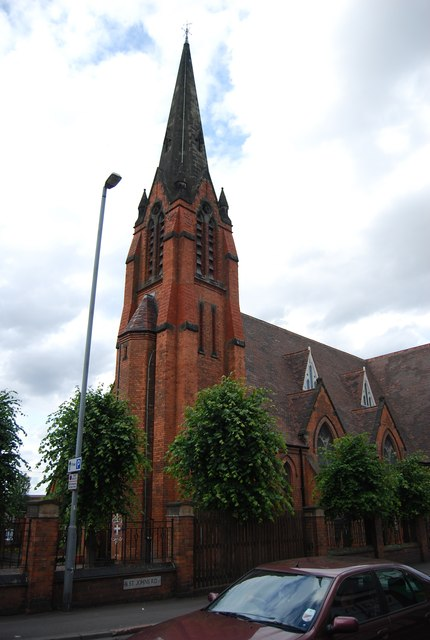
St John's Church

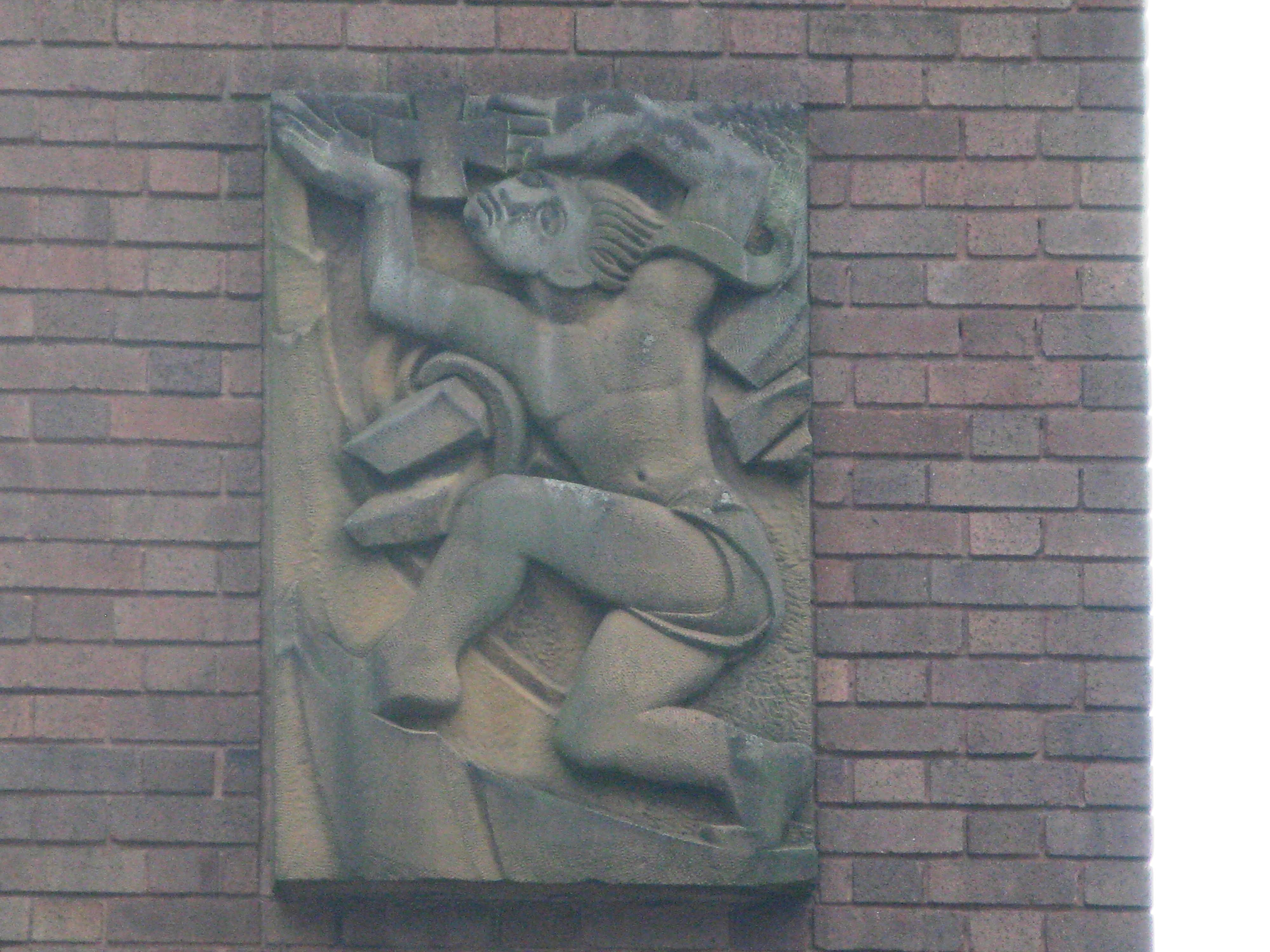
A sculpture at Sparkhill Methodist Church

Sparkhill was removed from Yardley and annexed by Birmingham in 1911 as part of the Greater Birmingham Act. Yardley also became a suburb of Birmingham in the same year. The former council house for Yardley District Council (built 1898–1902, architect Arthur Harrison) was converted into Sparkhill Library (SP09238366) and opened on 19 January 1923. It is one of the earliest examples of double-glazed windows in a public building. Other buildings built for the district were a police station, magistrate's court and a fire station, which were all located next to the council house. St John's Church is the local Anglican Parish Church and the home of the charity Narthex Sparkhill. Designed by the famous Birmingham Architects Martin and Chamberlain, the church was built in 1888. A reredos in memory of Louisa Ryland was erected in the church after her death.

=== World War II ===
As a result of the nearby BSA factory being targeted, the area suffered from bombing in World War II, resulting in the loss of some houses, and their 1940s replacement (e.g. the houses at 180–190 Osborne Road). A memorial to those from the BSA works who died during the Second World War can be found in St John's Church.

=== Historic public houses ===
Another old landmark in Sparkhill is the Mermaid Inn, which has been the site of a pub since the 17th century. The building was converted into a Balti restaurant in the late 20th century; however, it was severely damaged by numerous fires in the 2000s decade. The building's art deco exterior decoration is by local sculptor William Bloye. Other pubs, the Bear and The Antelope, both designed by Holland W. Hobbiss, have sculpted pub signs by Bloye.

== Immigration ==
The first wave of immigrants were of Irish descent. This has progressed to include Afro-Caribbeans, South Asians, and more recently Somalis. Moreover, in the last decade, migrants of Romanian descent have begun to settle in the area, mostly inhabiting terraced houses. It has a large population of ethnic minorities, mainly of South Asian origin, which is reflected by the number of Asian eateries in the area.

== Notable residents of Sparkhill ==
- Bev Bevan, drummer with the Move and the Electric Light Orchestra
- Charlie Timmins, Coventry City captain
- Gil Merrick, Birmingham City goalkeeper
- John Bentley, actor born in Sparkhill (1916)
- Kevin McDonald, archbishop
- Lock Up, band
- Moazzam Begg, Guantanamo Bay detainee
- Paul Bliss, keyboard player with the Moody Blues, the Hollies and the Bliss Band
- Moeen Munir Ali, England international cricketer
- Robert Melville, art critic
- Sid Field, comedian
- Roland Gift, actor and lead singer of Fine Young Cannibals
- Simon Inglis, architectural historian, writer and broadcaster
- Mona Washbourne, actress

== In popular culture ==
The BBC sitcom Citizen Khan focuses on the life of Mr Khan and his family of Pakistani immigrants in the Sparkhill area, which it dubbed "The capital of British Pakistan" in the credits. The first series was broadcast from August 2012 with a new series each year.

== Sources ==
- Brum and Brummies: Vol 2, Chapter 3: The Old End – The Hills are Alive: Sparkhill, Carl Chinn, 2001, Brewin Books (ISBN 1-85858-202-4)
- Public Sculpture of Birmingham including Sutton Coldfield, George T. Noszlopy, edited Jeremy Beach, 1998, ISBN 0-85323-692-5
