= Holland W. Hobbiss =

English architect

- Born: 8 February 1880; Birmingham, England
- Died: 22 July 1970 (aged 90)
- Occupation: Architect

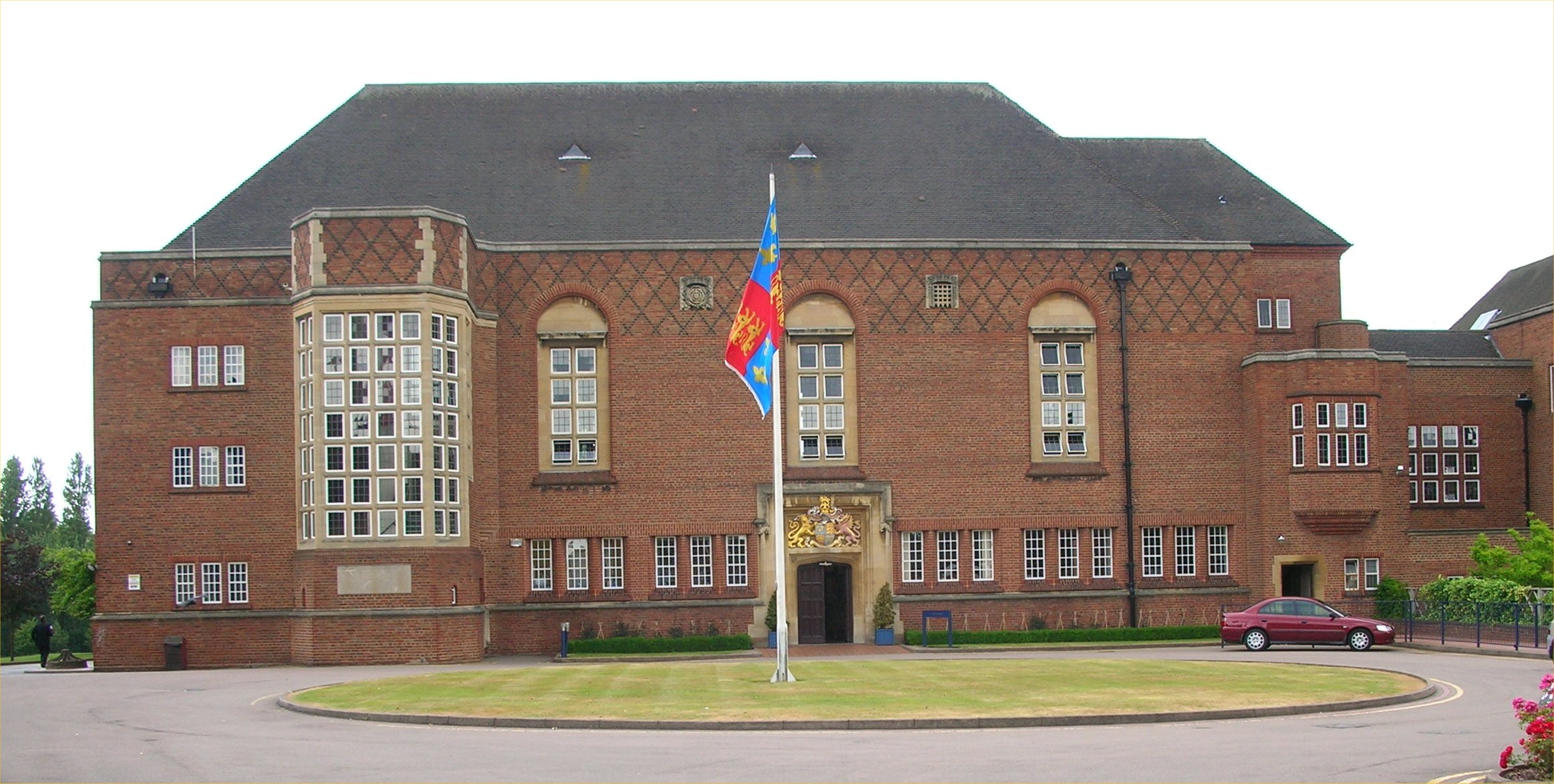
King Edward's School, Edgbaston

Holland William Hobbiss, FRIBA (8 February 1880 – 22 July 1970) was an English architect in the Birmingham area. He traded under the names Holland W. Hobbiss and Partners and Holland W. Hobbiss and M. A. H. Hobbiss.

== Life ==
Hobbiss was born in Birmingham on 8 February 1880, the eldest son of Henry Hobbiss, a schoolmaster and later a lecturer in a teaching college, and his wife, Alice.

In 1914 Hobbiss won a national competition (and a 25 guinea prize) for his design of agricultural workers' cottages in Essex. During the First World War, he served as a second lieutenant in the Royal Garrison Artillery. Between 1956 and 1958 Hobbiss was elected and sat as president of the Royal Birmingham Society of Artists.

His signature brick pattern was an English garden wall bond with three rows of stretchers between each row of headers.

A number of his buildings were decorated by the sculptor William Bloye.

He died in Birmingham in 1970.

== Works ==
He designed:

- St Mark's Church House, Washwood Heath, 1909–10
- Fox and Goose pub, Washwood Heath, 1913
- The Bear Public House, Stratford Road, Sparkhill
- The Antelope, Birmingham, Stratford Road, Sparkhill 1922 Listed Grade II in 1991 (with Bloye sculptures)
- St Giles, Church Road, Rowley Regis, 1923 with A. S. Dixon.
- The Guild of Students, University of Birmingham, 1928-30. Extended 1948-51 and 1960. (with Bloye sculptures)
- Queens College, Somerset Road, Edgbaston. Residential block and lodge 1929-30, chapel 1938-47
- Pitmaston, formerly the Ideal Benefit Society Building, Goodby Road, Edgbaston, 1930-1. Listed Grade II in 2002
- Christ Church, Burney Lane, Ward End, 1935 (with Bloye sculptures) Listed Grade II in 2009
- St Mary and St John, Alum Rock Road, 1934-5
- 53 Church Road, Edgbaston, Birmingham (now the Westbourne Centre), 1935
- Crematorium and chapel at Lodge Hill Cemetery in Selly Oak, 1936–37
- Three Tuns Hotel, Lichfield Street, Tamworth, opened 1937
- Holy Cross church, Brigfield Road, Billesley Common, 1937
- King Edward's School, 1937-47. He rebuilt and clad with brick the upper corridor of the New Street (Charles Barry) King Edward's school as the current chapel, 1952-3. Chapel listed Grade II listed
- King Edward VI High School for Girls, 1937-47.
- St Edmund, Reddings Lane, Tyseley, 1939-40
- Foundation of the Schools of King Edward VI, Foundation Offices.
- The Copcut Elm, Salwarpe, 1937
- Chemical Engineering Building, University of Birmingham, 1960 (Holland W. Hobbiss and Partners)
- Edgbaston High School for Girls, 1960 (Holland W. Hobbiss and Partners)
- St Francis' Hall, University of Birmingham, 1936. Extended 1968-9.

He also designed a number of unnamed houses in Amesbury Road and Russell Road in Moseley.

He completed the west end of St Gregory the Great's Church, Small Heath in 1926-1928 Listed Grade II listed in 1994

== Sources ==
- Pevsner Architectural Guides - Birmingham, Andy Foster, 2005, ISBN 0-300-10731-5
