= Gordon Nutt =

English footballer

Personal information
- Date of birth: 8 November 1932
- Place of birth: South Yardley, England
- Date of death: 25 February 2014 (aged 81)
- Place of death: Tasmania, Australia
- Position: Winger

Youth career
- Sheldon Town

Senior career*
Years	Team	Apps	(Gls)
1951–1954	Coventry City	76	(11)
1954–1955	Cardiff City	17	(4)
1955–1960	Arsenal	49	(10)
1960–1961	Southend United	16	(2)
1961–1962	PSV	31	(5)
1965	Sydney Croatia		
1968–1969	Manly-Warringah		
Total		158	(27)

Managerial career
- 1966: Sydney Croatia
- 1969: Manly Warringah (Assistant)
- * Club domestic league appearances and goals

Gordon Nutt (8 November 1932 – 25 February 2014) was an English professional footballer who played as a winger. Nutt played in the Football League for Coventry City, Cardiff City, Arsenal and Southend United, in the Netherlands for PSV Eindhoven, and in Australia for Sydney Croatia and Manly-Warringah.

== Career ==
=== Playing career ===
Born in South Yardley, Nutt played youth football for Sheldon Town. He then went on to Coventry City in 1951, scoring 11 goals in 76 appearances over the next three seasons. In 1954 he signed for Cardiff City, where he spent one season, making 17 appearances. In 1955 he signed for Arsenal. Nutt spent a total of 5 seasons with the club, scoring 10 goals in 51 appearances.

After leaving Arsenal, Nutt joined Southend United, and then Dutch club PSV, where he spent one season, scoring 5 goals in 31 appearances. He later played for Australian clubs Sydney Croatia and Manly United FC all in all.

=== Coaching career ===
Nutt was also a coach at Sydney Croatia in 1966 and an assistant coach at Manly-Warringah in 1969.

== Later life and death ==
Nutt died on 25 February 2014, in Tasmania, at the age of 81.
