= Blakesley Hall =

Tudor hall in Yardley, Birmingham, England

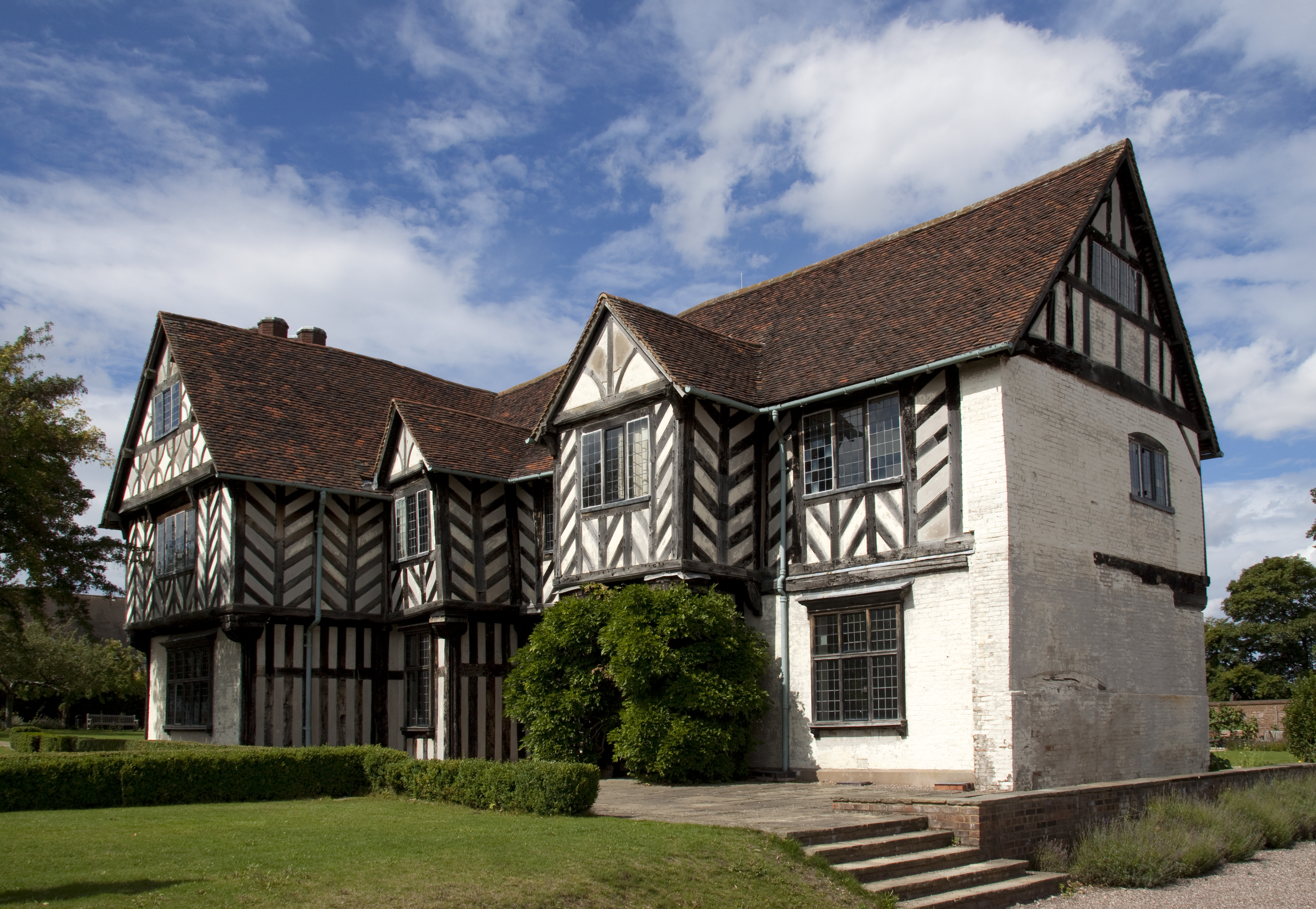
- Blakesley Hall front façade

- Location in West Midlands
- 52°28′24″N 1°48′34″W
- Location: Yardley
- OS grid reference: SP 13042 86185

History
- Built: 1590

Site notes
- Area: Birmingham
- Architectural style: Tudor
- Governing body: Birmingham Museums Trust

Listed Building – Grade II*
- Official name: Blakesley Hall
- Designated: 29 April 1952
- Reference no.: 1075711

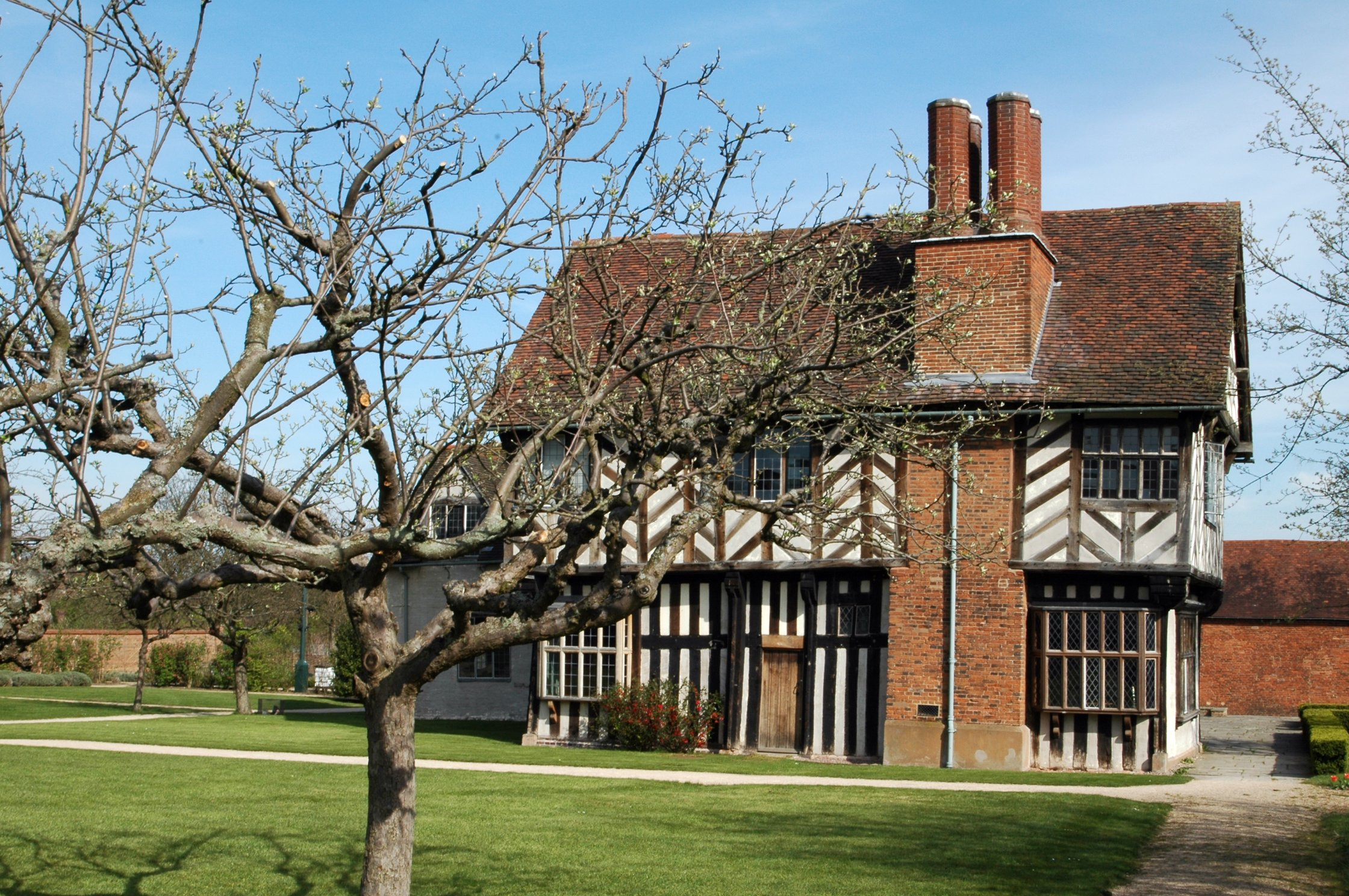
Blakesley Hall's side exterior.

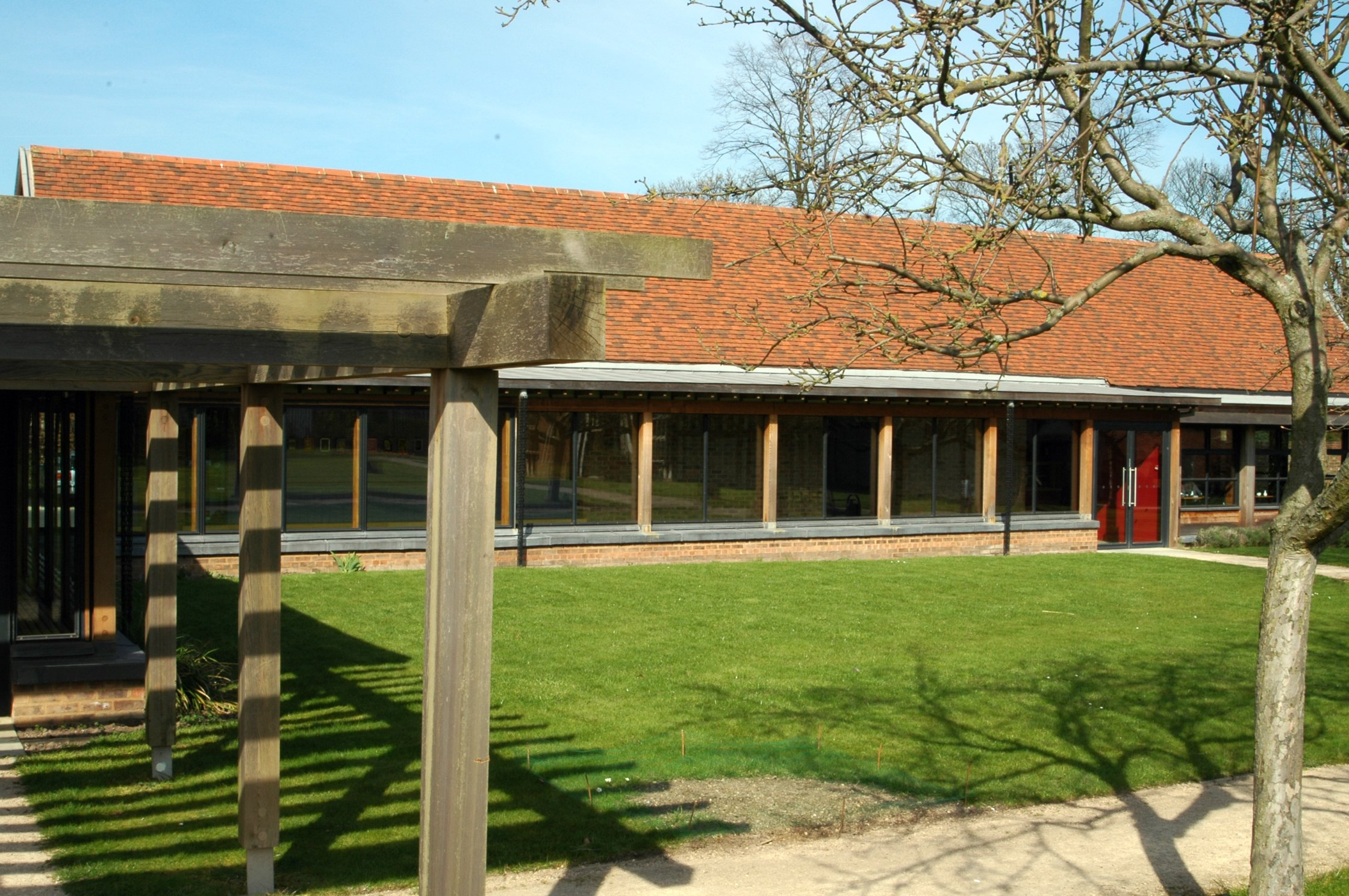
The visitor centre constructed in 2002.

Blakesley Hall, a grade II* listed building is a Tudor hall on Blakesley Road in Yardley, Birmingham, England. It is one of the oldest buildings in Birmingham and is a typical example of Tudor architecture with the use of darkened timber and wattle-and-daub infill, with an external lime render which is painted white. The extensive use of close studding and herringbone patterns on all sides of the house make this a home that was designed to show the wealth and status of the owner. The house is also jettied on all sides. At the rear of the hall, built on the back of the chimney, is a brick kitchen block dating from circa 1650.

The hall is a timber-framed farmhouse built in 1590 (when Yardley was in Worcestershire) by Richard Smalbroke, a man of local importance to Yardley. His family farmed at the hall and had other buildings in the surrounding area which were lost over time. After 1685, the building passed into the hands of the Greswolde family and for the next 200 years became a tenant farm. In 1899, the hall was acquired by Henry Donne who renovated the dilapidated house before selling it to the Merry family, a local paint and varnish manufacturer, who were the last family to occupy the hall.

The hall became a museum in 1935 after centuries of use as a private home and its parlour was renovated. Its purpose was to display the history of the local medieval manors which comprise Birmingham. The Hall was damaged by a bomb in November 1941 causing extensive damage and the museum did not open again until 1957. After research in the 1970s, the Hall was restored to an authentic period appearance and refurbished using furnishings drawn from the 1684 inventory of the contents.

It was last renovated in 2002 with the extension of a visitor centre and car park. Some structural work was also carried out in the hall and modern intrusive features such as the toilet block and the boiler room were removed, the former being relocated into the new visitor centre. This allowed the second smaller parlour to be placed on the ground floor next to the Great Parlour.

Many of the original architectural features of the hall remain such as the herringbone floor. Among the artefacts discovered at the hall are candlesticks and pewter goblets. In the Bedchamber, paintings on the wall from 1590 were discovered after being hidden for centuries, their rediscovery partly in thanks of the bomb damage that loosened a significant amount of plaster in the hall. When renovations took place postwar, inspection of the bedchamber revealed fragments of leather and painted plaster. When the chamber was cleaned up, the walls and timbers were shown to be decorated in a Moorish design. A mock up of how the 'painted chamber' would have looked can be seen in the back bedroom at Blakesley hall.

As a Community Museum, that is a branch museum, of the Birmingham Museums & Art Gallery it is run by Birmingham Museums Trust. An adjacent barn (Grade II listed) to the east of the hall has been renovated and consists of exhibition space and space for social functions.

The Gilbertstone, moved in local folklore by the Giant named Gilbert (which gave its name to the area of Gilbertstone on the border of Yardley and South Yardley), is displayed in the grounds of the museum.

== Sources ==
- By the Gains of Industry - Birmingham Museums and Art Gallery 1885-1985, Stuart Davies, 1985, Birmingham Museums and Art Gallery (ISBN 0-7093-0131-6)
- Frommer's England 2005, Darwin Porter and Danforth Prince, 2004, Frommer's (ISBN 0764568965)
- The Royal Town of Sutton Coldfield - A Commemorative History, Douglas V. Jones, 1994, Westwood Press (ISBN 0-9502636-7-2)
- Blakesley Hall, Birmingham Museums and Art Gallery, 2006 (leaflet)
- "Medieval Yardley", Victor Skipp, 1970, Phillimore.
