= St Christopher's Church, Springfield =

St Christopher’s Church, Springfield
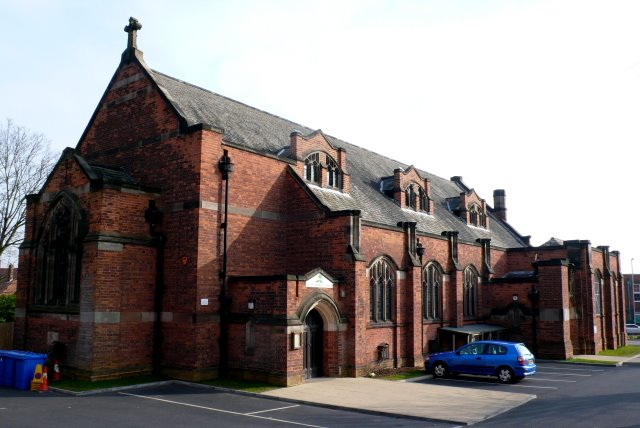
- St Christopher’s Church, Springfield
- St Christopher’s Church, Springfield
- 52°26′35.75″N 1°51′35.64″W
- OS grid reference: SP 09635 82842
- Location: Springfield, Birmingham
- Country: England
- Denomination: Church of England
- Website: stchristopherschurch.co.uk

History
- Consecrated: 1907

Architecture
- Architect: Arthur Harrison
- Style: Decorated Gothic

Administration
- Diocese: Anglican Diocese of Birmingham
- Archdeaconry: Aston
- Deanery: Yardley and Bordesley
- Parish: Springfield

St Christopher's Church, Springfield is a Church of England building in the Anglican Diocese of Birmingham.

== History ==
The church was built by the architect Arthur Harrison in the Decorated Gothic style. It was consecrated in 1907, and a parish assigned out of St John's Church, Sparkhill in 1911.

== Organ ==
The church has a two manual pipe organ by Ingram and Co of Hereford from 1936. A specification of the organ can be found on the National Pipe Organ Register.
