= Sparkhill Library =

Municipal building in Birmingham, West Midlands, England

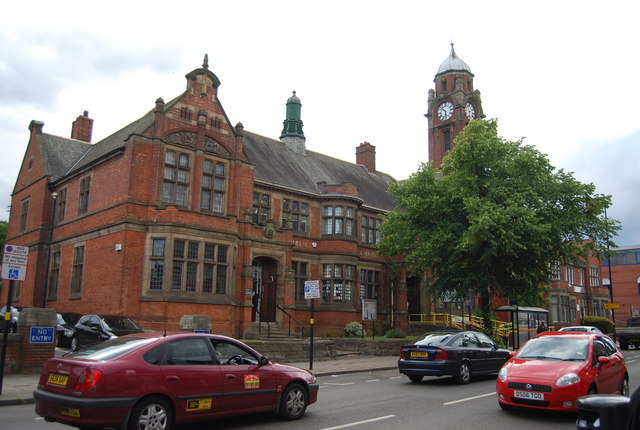
- The building in June 2011

- Shown in West Midlands
- 52.4504°N 1.8642°W
- Location: Stratford Road, Sparkhill

History
- Built: 1902

Site notes
- Architect: Arthur Harrison
- Architectural style: Renaissance Revival style

Sparkhill Library, formerly Yardley Council House, is a municipal building in Stratford Road in Sparkhill, West Midlands, England. The building, which previously served as the offices of Yardley Rural District Council, now operates as a public library administered by Birmingham City Council.

== History ==
In the 19th century, Yardley was administered by a parish council. However, following implementation of the Local Government Act 1894, Yardley Rural District Council was formed in 1895. The new council immediately decided to commission a council house (town hall) for the area. The site they selected was open land on the southwest side of Stratford Road. Construction of the new building started in 1900. It was designed by Arthur Harrison in the Renaissance Revival style, built in red brick with stone dressings at a cost of £16,000 (equivalent to £1,700,300 in 2025) and was officially opened on Wednesday 15 January 1902.

The design involved a symmetrical main block of seven bays facing onto Stratford Road, with a dominant clock tower at the northern end. The central bay featured semi-circular bay windows on both floors and there was a lantern at roof level. The bays flanking the central bay were fenestrated by mullioned and tramsomed windows on both floors. The second bay from each end contained segmental headed doorways on the ground floor and mullioned and transomed windows on the first floor. The end bays contained bay windows on the ground floor and mullioned and transomed windows surmounted by panels sculpted by Benjamin Creswick on the first floor: the panels were flanked by turrets and there were gables above. The clock tower was equipped with an hour-striking clock, manufactured by Evans of Handsworth and donated by William Henry Barber.

The building continued to serve as the offices of the council until Yardley was annexed by Birmingham in April 1912. The building was subsequently converted into a public library with a children's section on the ground floor: it re-opened as such on 19 January 2023.

In 2014, after local councillors made a plea for the building to be offered for community use, it was saved from being placed on the open market.

== See also ==
- List of libraries in Birmingham, West Midlands
