= Gilbertstone =

Coordinates: 52°27′39″N 01°48′07″W

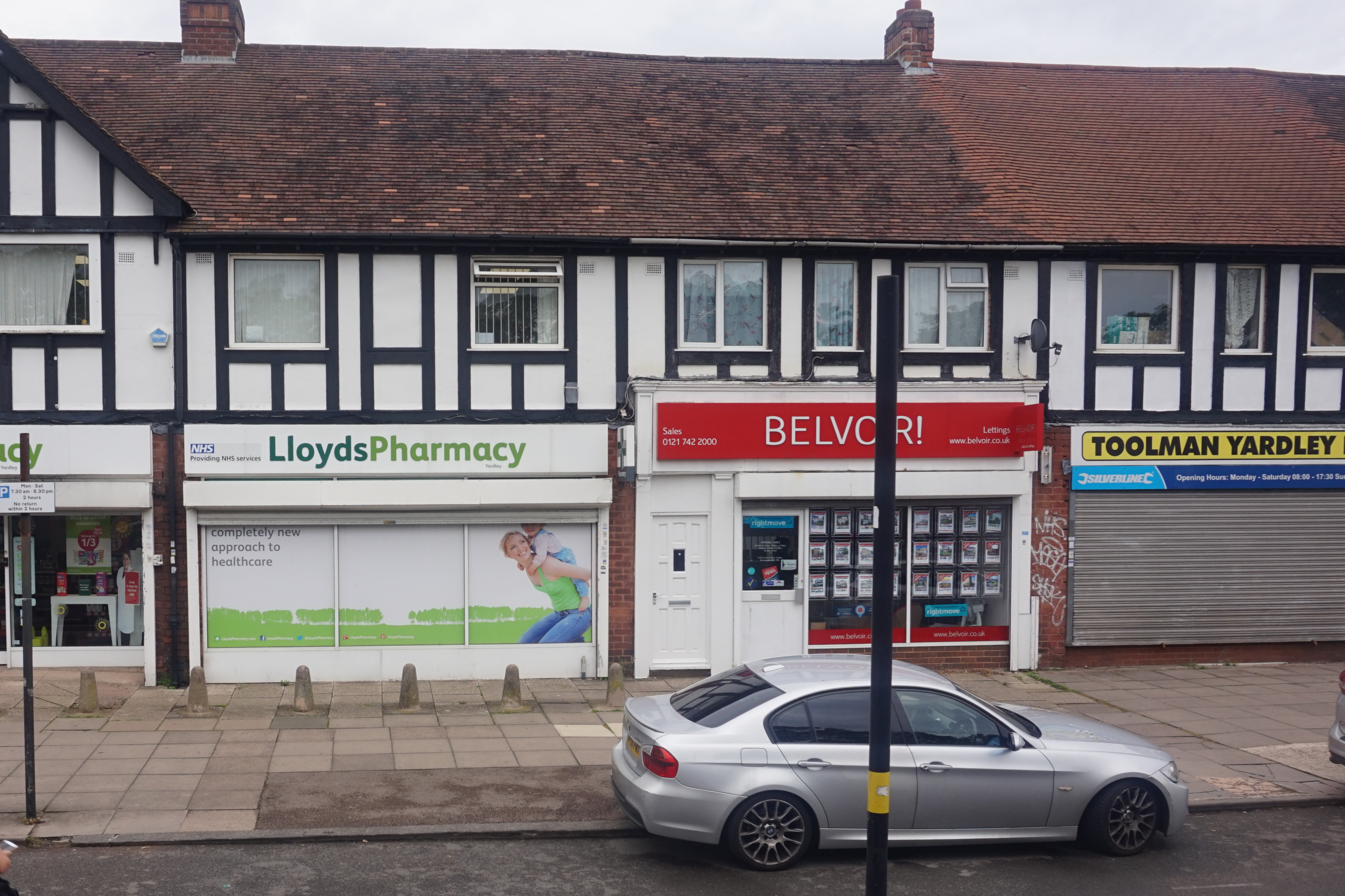
Shops on Coventry Road

Gilbertstone is a residential suburban area straddling the border of Yardley and South Yardley in Birmingham, West Midlands.

== Etymology ==
It is unknown where the name actually came from but a local legend states that a man named Gilbert lifted an enormous stone to move the boundaries between his and another person's land so that he could gain more land. The supposed stone, which is an erratic from the Ice Age, is now kept at Blakesley Hall in Yardley.

== History ==
Gilbertstone was shown as a separate entity to Yardley in John Ogilby's strip map of Coventry Road. Gilbertstone developed as a result of the construction of the now-demolished Gilbertstone House, which was built between 1866 and 1867 for Samuel Thornley, on the site of a small farmhouse. Gilbertstone House was bought by Richard Tangye in 1883, a major benefactor to the Birmingham Art Gallery. The house had extensive grounds which crossed into the area of Lyndon End and Bickenhill. It had a pool with a boathouse. On the side of the house was a 65-foot (20 m) tall tower.

It was recorded in 1905 that the mansion and grounds straddled the boundaries of the counties of Warwickshire and Worcestershire.

Thomas Rowbotham lived in the house whilst developing the nearby roads. He gave land for the construction of St. Michael and All Angels Church, although that piece was exchanged for the site the church was actually built on. He also sold various pieces of land for development. Sir Hanson Rowbotham sold the estate for £250,000 and the house was demolished in 1937. The 300-acre (1.2 km^{2}) estate was to be used for the construction of 3,000 houses, however, World War II suspended the construction of the properties on site.

Visitors to the farmhouse and the manor on its site included John Bright, Catherine Hutton, William Hutton's daughter, and members of the Royal Colonial Institute.

The area the estate covered is now crossed by Saxondale Avenue, which is the exact location of the house, Sunnymead Road and parts of Wensley Road, Brays Road and Wychwood Crescent. Manor House Lane reflects the former land usage of the nearby area. Moat Lane, bordering Gilbertstone, receives its name from one of the two moats in Gilbertstone, the remains of which can still be seen in Gilbertstone Recreation Ground alongside Moat Lane.

The area was damaged by night bombing raids by the Luftwaffe during World War II. After the war, a new estate of 576 houses was built; 207 of which (36%) were designed by RIBA approved architects. There was criticism over the aesthetics of the area.

In 1950, a primary school, designed by Crouch, Butler and Savage was built in a typical postwar style. The wooden structures, which had formed Oaklands County Primary School, had been completely dismantled from their site in Dolphin Lane in Acocks Green and reassembled on the new estate. The buildings were demolished in 1998 following concerns over the stability of the structure. In 1998, construction work on the new buildings commenced and were opened by Estelle Morris on 24 March 2000. The school was able to construct the buildings following a cash injection by Birmingham Airport.

== Present day ==
Gilbertstone is a small suburb in the area of Yardley and South Yardley. It is served by Gilbertstone Primary School (Infants and Juniors), which has a pupil capacity of 400 including the nursery. In addition, there is a large recreation ground, Gilbertstone Recreation Ground, which is used by Tennis For Free, a charity promoting tennis.
