= South Yardley =

Coordinates: 52.4597°N 1.8191°W

- Location within the West Midlands
- Population: 30,786 (2011.Ward)
  - Density: 43.0 per ha
- OS grid reference: SP125845
- Metropolitan borough: Birmingham
- Metropolitan county: West Midlands
- Region: West Midlands
- Country: England
- Sovereign state: United Kingdom
- Post town: BIRMINGHAM
- Postcode district: B27
- Dialling code: 0121
- Police: West Midlands
- Fire: West Midlands
- Ambulance: West Midlands
- UK Parliament: Birmingham Yardley

South Yardley is a largely residential area in east Birmingham, England about 3.5 miles (6 km) from the city centre, and one of the city's 69 electoral wards.

== Ward ==
Following the 2017 City of Birmingham ward revisions South Yardley covers a much smaller area.

Former boundaries

The ward of the same name previously covered a larger area that included Greet, Hay Mills, Small Heath Park, South Yardley, Tyseley and parts of Yardley and Gilbertstone. The name of the ward was changed from Acocks Green Ward and with the name change, the boundary changed with Acocks Green village and Acocks Green railway station being lost and the boundary being extended north to Bordesley Green East. The area was extended up to Golden Hillock Road. This included the Small Heath Park area and Greet.

South Yardley is one of the four wards that make up the council constituency of Yardley.

== Population ==
According to the 2001 UK Census, there were 27,620 people living in 10,907 households within the then ward boundaries of South Yardley. 30.3% (8,375) of the ward's population consists of ethnic minorities compared with 29.6% for Birmingham in general. The population of the ward had increased at the 2011 census to 30,786.

== Notable residents ==
- Graham Short (renowned micro-artist) Master engraver known for engraving The Lord's Prayer on the head of a pin. (1946 -
- Gordon Nutt (8 November 1932 – 26 February 2014), former professional footballer who played in England, Wales, the Netherlands, and Australia; he made a total of 189 league appearances, and scored 32 goals.
- John Hemming, politician (MP for Birmingham Yardley from 2005 to 2015)

== Neighbourhood improvement schemes ==
Through Neighbourhood Renewal Funding, South Yardley has established the a scheme which involved street cleaning projects and training courses to improve the physical image of the area.

== Places of interest ==
The Swan Shopping Centre was demolished in 2009 after a prolonged period of falling trade. It included an indoor market with a multi-storey car park. Proposals for a replacement shopping centre in a more modern architectural style have been approved. Planning permission was granted after Tesco agreed to pay a sum of money to the development as they are building a store on the site and in the immediate vicinity of the site. The replacement shopping centre will include a public piazza and petrol station. As of 2025, the Swan Shopping Centre is still open with Tesco as their main anchor tentant. Councillor Jim Whorwood said the need to re-develop the Swan Centre was 'long overdue'.

The new Swan Shopping Centre opened in 2012.

South Yardley Library is within the ward. It re-opened on 6 May 2008 after extensive refurbishments and offers free internet access on 30 computers.
