= Springfield, Birmingham =

Coordinates: 52.4314°N 1.8595°W

Springfield
- Location within the West Midlands
- Population: 31,391 (2011.Ward)
  - Density: 69.3 per ha
- OS grid reference: SP095815
- Metropolitan borough: Birmingham
- Metropolitan county: West Midlands
- Region: West Midlands
- Country: England
- Sovereign state: United Kingdom
- Post town: BIRMINGHAM
- Postcode district: B13
- Dialling code: 0121
- Police: West Midlands
- Fire: West Midlands
- Ambulance: West Midlands
- UK Parliament: Birmingham Hall Green

Springfield is a ward in south east Birmingham, England, created in 2004 from much of the old Sparkhill ward. It is a part of the formal district of Hall Green.

== Places of interest ==
The area is served by the Sparkhill Library that has, with its distinctive clock tower, developed into a local landmark. It was built in 1900 as the council house for the Yardley District Council. The building was converted into a library and opened on 19 January 1923. It is one of the earliest examples of double glazing windows in a public building.

St John's Church, Sparkhill is the Anglican Parish church for the northern part of Springfield Ward. It is also home of the charity, Narthex Sparkhill. Also in the area is St Christopher's Church, Springfield.

== Politics ==
It is represented on Birmingham City Council by three Labour councillors.

== Transport ==
Spring Road railway station is located within the ward's boundaries and is located on the Birmingham Snow Hill-Stratford-upon-Avon line. National Express West Midlands operates the numbers 2, 3, 5, 6, and 31 bus routes, to and from Birmingham city centre.
