= The Antelope, Birmingham =

Grade II listed building, formerly a pub, in Sparkhill, Birmingham, England

Coordinates: 52.453362°N 1.865753°W

The Antelope
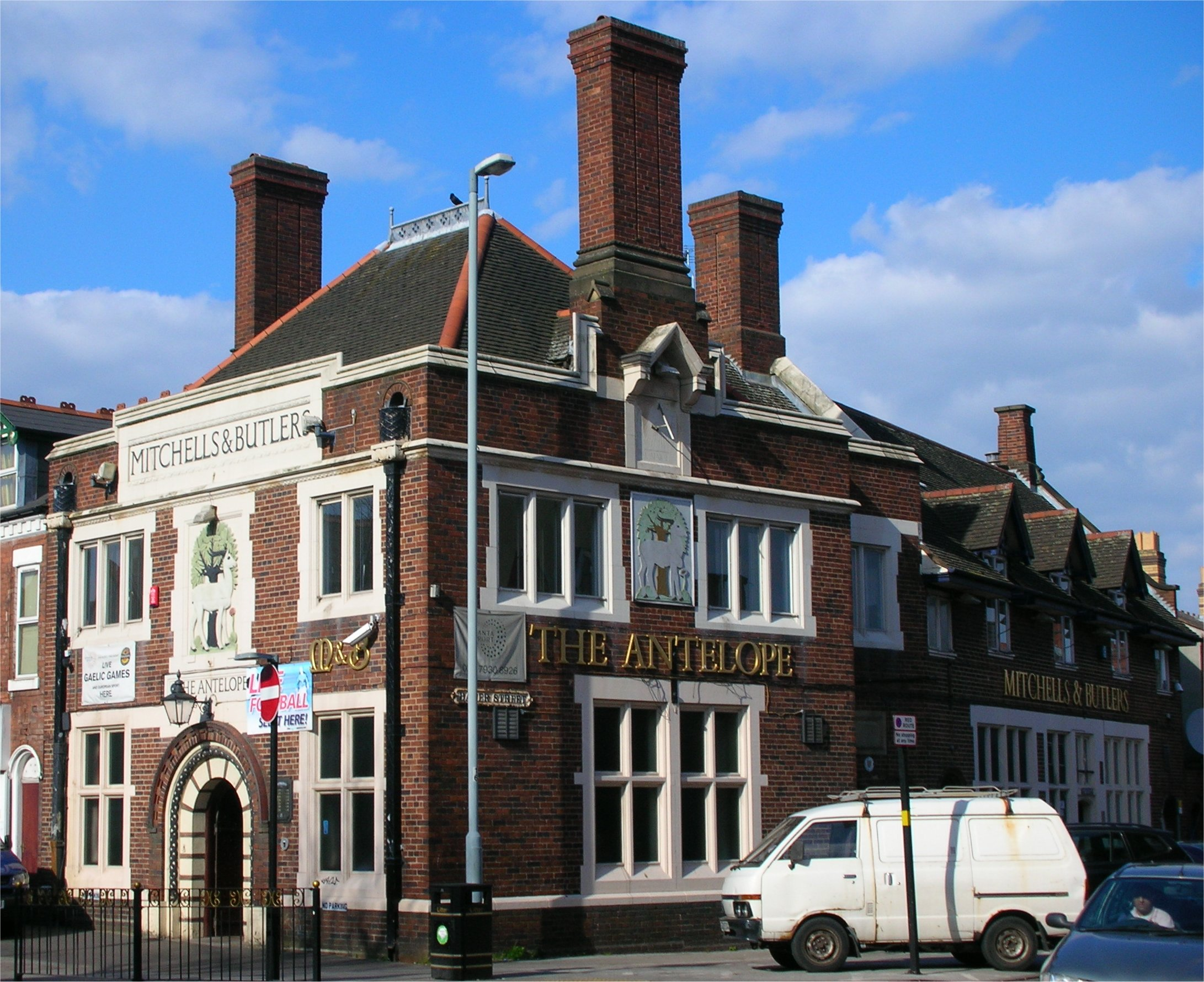
- Interactive map of the The Antelope area

General information
- Type: Public house
- Location: Birmingham, England

The Antelope, now housing a restaurant called Blac, is a grade II listed building on the Stratford Road in Sparkhill, Birmingham, England. It opened as a public house called The Antelope in 1924.

The building features bas-relief carvings designed by local artist William Bloye and sculpted by his assistant, Tom Wright.

Hajees Spices was replaced in 2020 by Des Pardes, but by 2021 the building was to let again. Blac Restaurant & Lounge opened here around 2023-24.

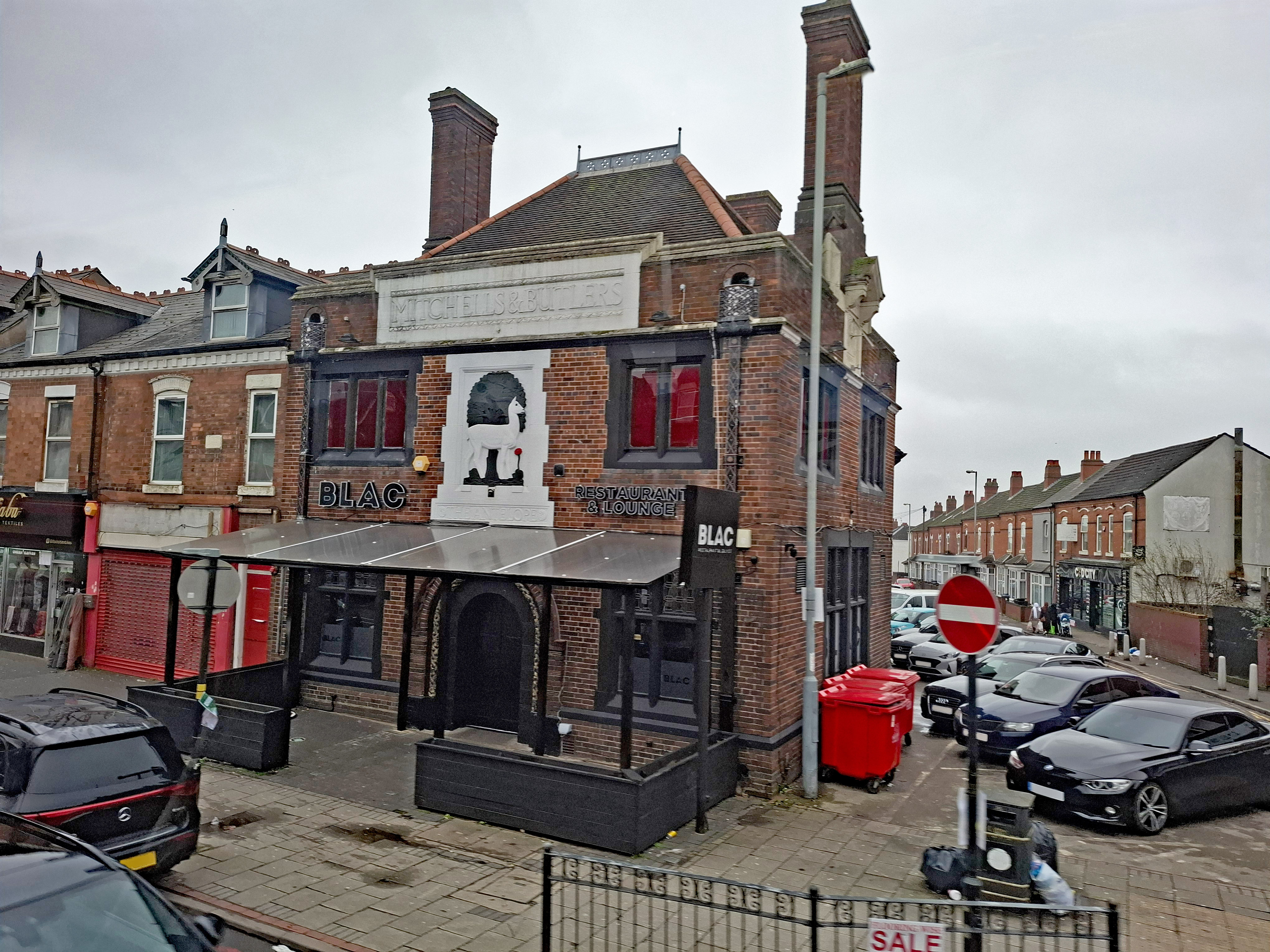
Blac in 2026
