= Yardley, Birmingham =

Area in Birmingham, England

Coordinates: 52°28′N 1°49′W

Yardley
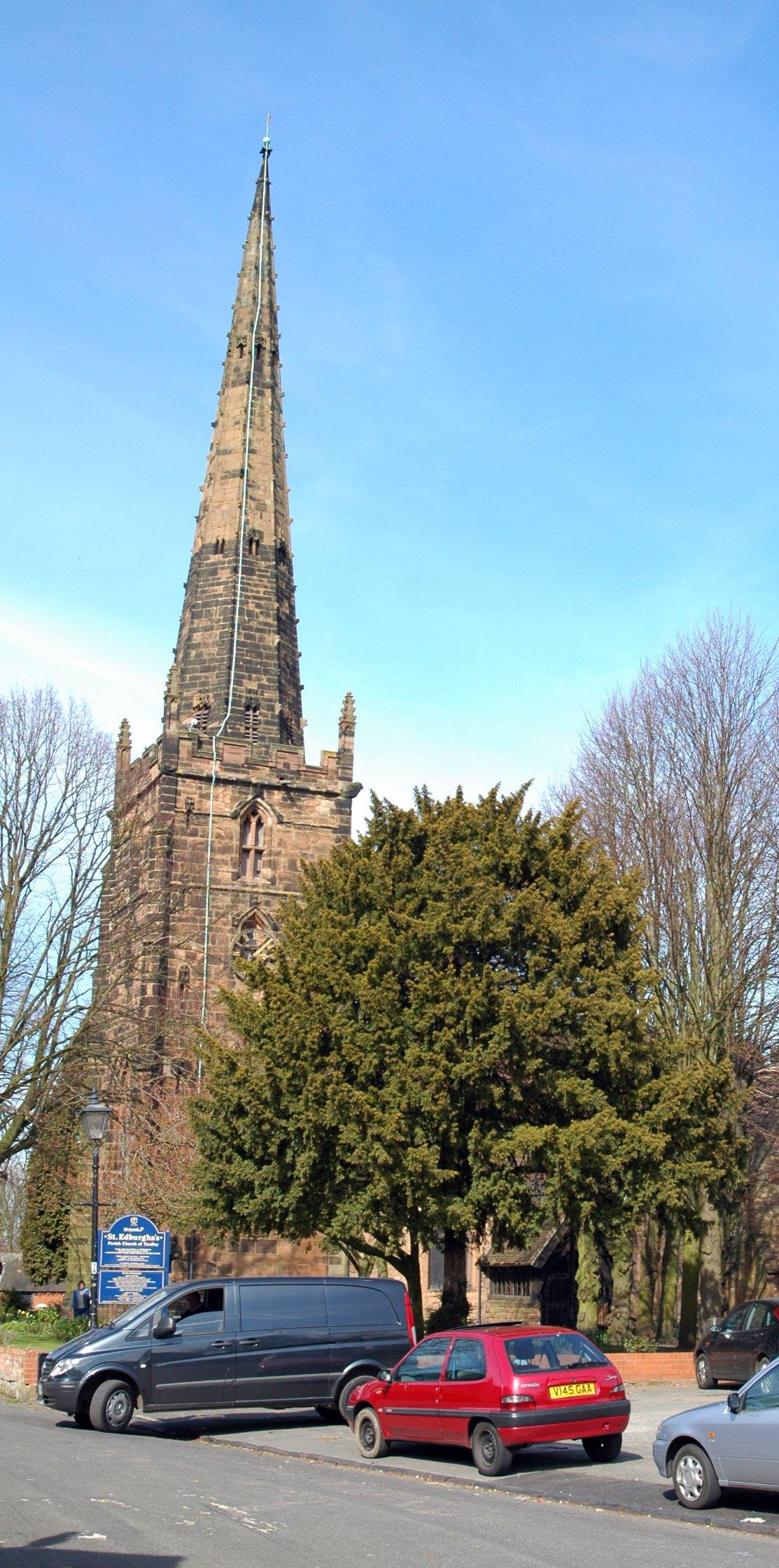
- St Edburgha's Church (Old Yardley Church) within the conservation zone

- Location within the West Midlands
- Metropolitan borough: Birmingham
- Metropolitan county: West Midlands
- Region: West Midlands
- Country: England
- Sovereign state: United Kingdom
- Post town: BIRMINGHAM
- Postcode district: B25
- Dialling code: 0121
- Police: West Midlands
- Fire: West Midlands
- Ambulance: West Midlands

Yardley is an area in east Birmingham, in the county of the West Midlands, England. It is also a council constituency, managed by its own district committee. Historically it lay within Worcestershire.

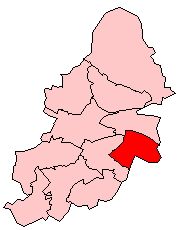
Yardley constituency shown within Birmingham.

Birmingham Yardley is a constituency and its Member of Parliament is Jess Phillips, elected in May 2015.

The area of Gilbertstone straddles the border of Yardley and South Yardley.

== Features ==
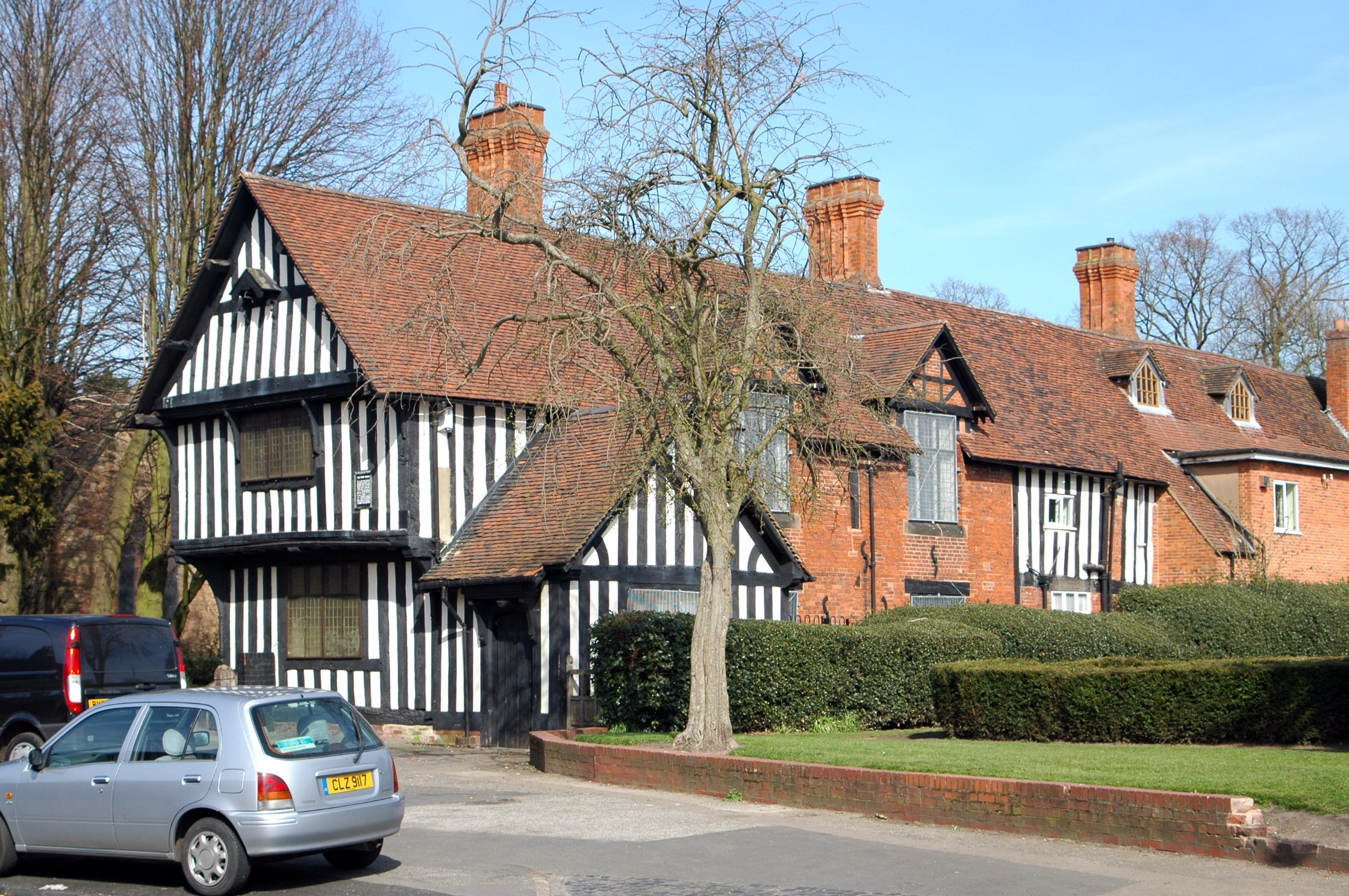
Old Yardley Grammar School within the conservation zone.

Yardley's main shopping area is known as Yew Tree, named after a 1919 public house, The Yew Tree, that was demolished in 2000 to make way for the shopping centre. Prior to the building of the public house, this was the site of the 19th century Yardley House, presumably incorporating a yew tree.

The Swan public house run by Ansells Brewery was, for a time, the largest in Great Britain with eight bars and a total drinking area of almost 14,000 square feet serving over 1,000 customers.

In 2012, the Swan Shopping Centre was opened in the area serving the Yardley area in the place of the old Swan Centre which used to hold markets.

== History ==
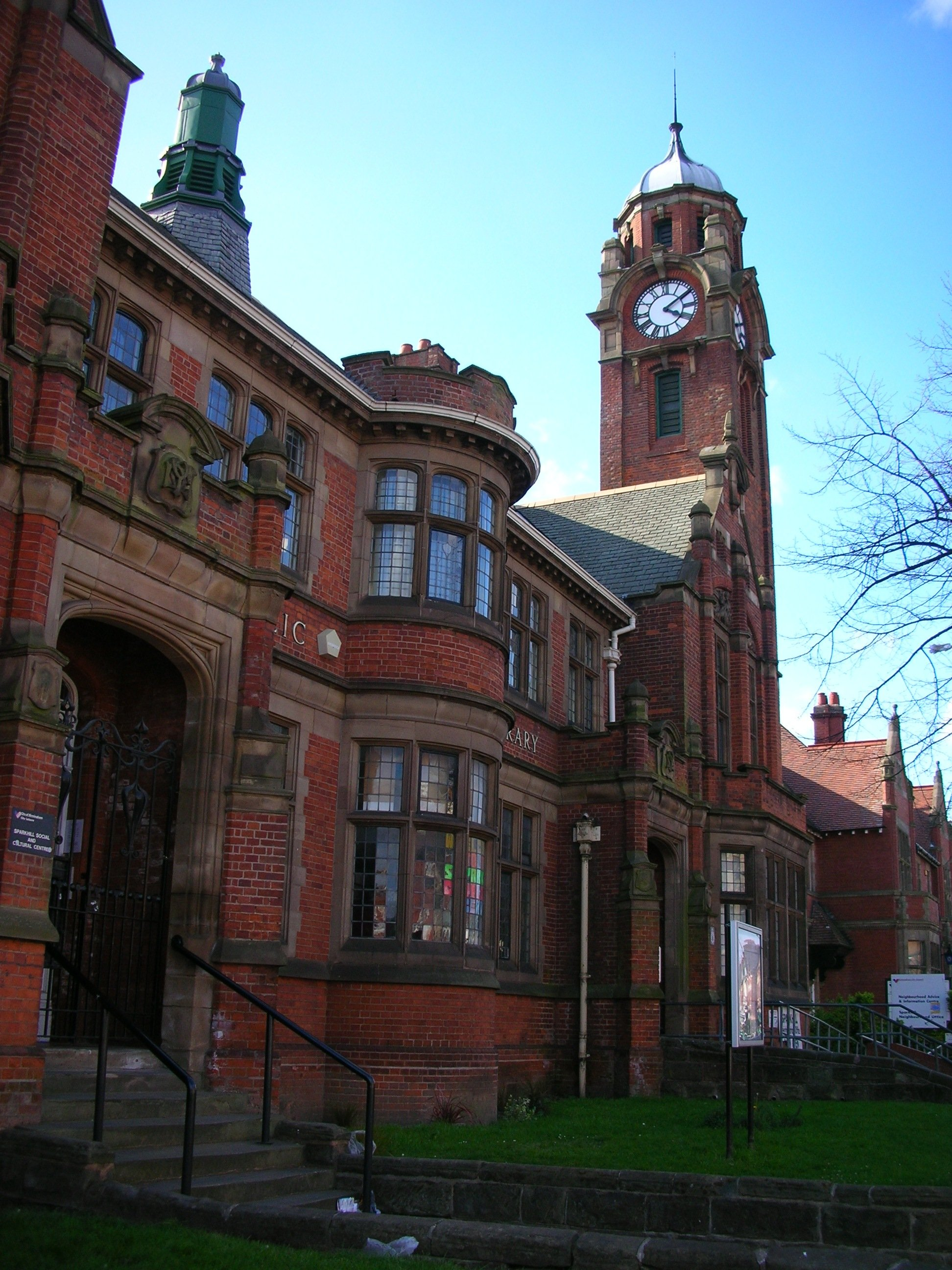
Yardley Council House, Sparkhill, 2007

=== Parish of Yardley ===
Yardley is not a town. The ancient parish of Yardley included the areas known as Stechford and Hall Green. Yardley is named in the Domesday Book and was referred to as early as 972 in King Edgar's Charter where it is named Gyrdleah. It was mentioned as being under the possession of Pershore Abbey. Yardley also contains a moated medieval site called "Kent's Moat". Now dry, it has retained its depth and shape remarkably well considering its age, as excavations have shown evidence of inhabitation from as early as the 12th century.

Yardley has a Tudor hall called Blakesley Hall and an old church, St Edburgha's, that dates back to the 13th century, with the church tower and spire dating to the 15th century. It was not established by the abbey, but by Aston Church in the Diocese of Lichfield. A Tudor addition to the church is a doorway surrounded by Tudor roses and a pomegranate, commemorating the marriage of Prince Arthur, Prince of Wales, to Catherine of Aragon.

Yardley had a manor that was owned by various lords. It remained unoccupied from 1700 onwards. It was owned by the Royal Family until 1626, when it was bought by Richard Grevis of Moseley Hall. His descendants sold it in 1759 to pay off debts. John Taylor, one of the founders of Lloyds Bank, bought the lordship in 1766. Most of the land, had by then, been purchased by other people so Taylor owned only a small portion of the original grounds.

In 1911 the civil parish had a population of 59,165. On 1 April 1912 the parish was abolished and merged with Birmingham.

=== Yardley Rural District ===
Map of present boundaries

Worcestershire	1831	1901
Broadway	1,517	1,414
Pershore	5,275	4,825
Yardley	2,488	33,946

Yardley Rural District was a local government administrative district formed from the parish of Yardley, historically part of Worcestershire under the Local Government Act 1894. The Rural District included the wards of Yardley Wood. Yardley Council House was originally erected to house the Rural District Council (Yardley RDC).

By 1911 Yardley was a residential suburb of Birmingham and was annexed to Birmingham and Warwickshire under the 1911 Greater Birmingham Act. Birmingham's Worcestershire heritage can be seen at Acocks Green police station where the building is decorated with a "three pears" motif from the Worcestershire coat of arms.

A small section of Yardley, called Old Yardley, was granted conservation area status in 1969, becoming Birmingham's first conservation area.

In 1981, an Arcon V prefab home on Moat Lane was dismantled and transported to Avoncroft Museum of Historic Buildings.

== Education ==
Yardley has five main primary schools. These are Yardley, Blakesley Hall, Lyndon Green, Oasis Academy Hobmoor and St. Bernedettes. It also has two main secondary schools, which are Cockshut Hill School and King Edward VI Sheldon Heath Academy.

Hobmoor Primary School moved to new premises in Summer 2007. The former building has been demolished and the site remains vacant to be redeveloped.

== Transport ==
Yardley's nearest railway station is Stechford railway station. It is served by National Express West MidlandsDiamond Bus.

The area used to be well-served by horse-buses and then by steam buses. Electric trams were then introduced and they travelled across a new bridge at the River Cole to the Swan.
