= Arthur Harrison (architect) =

British architect

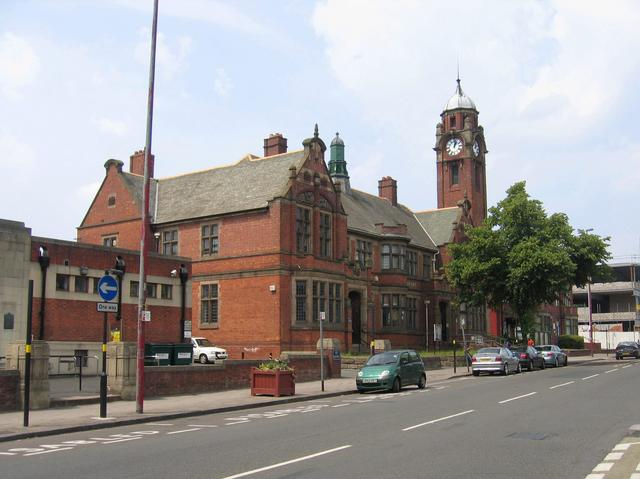
Yardley District Council House

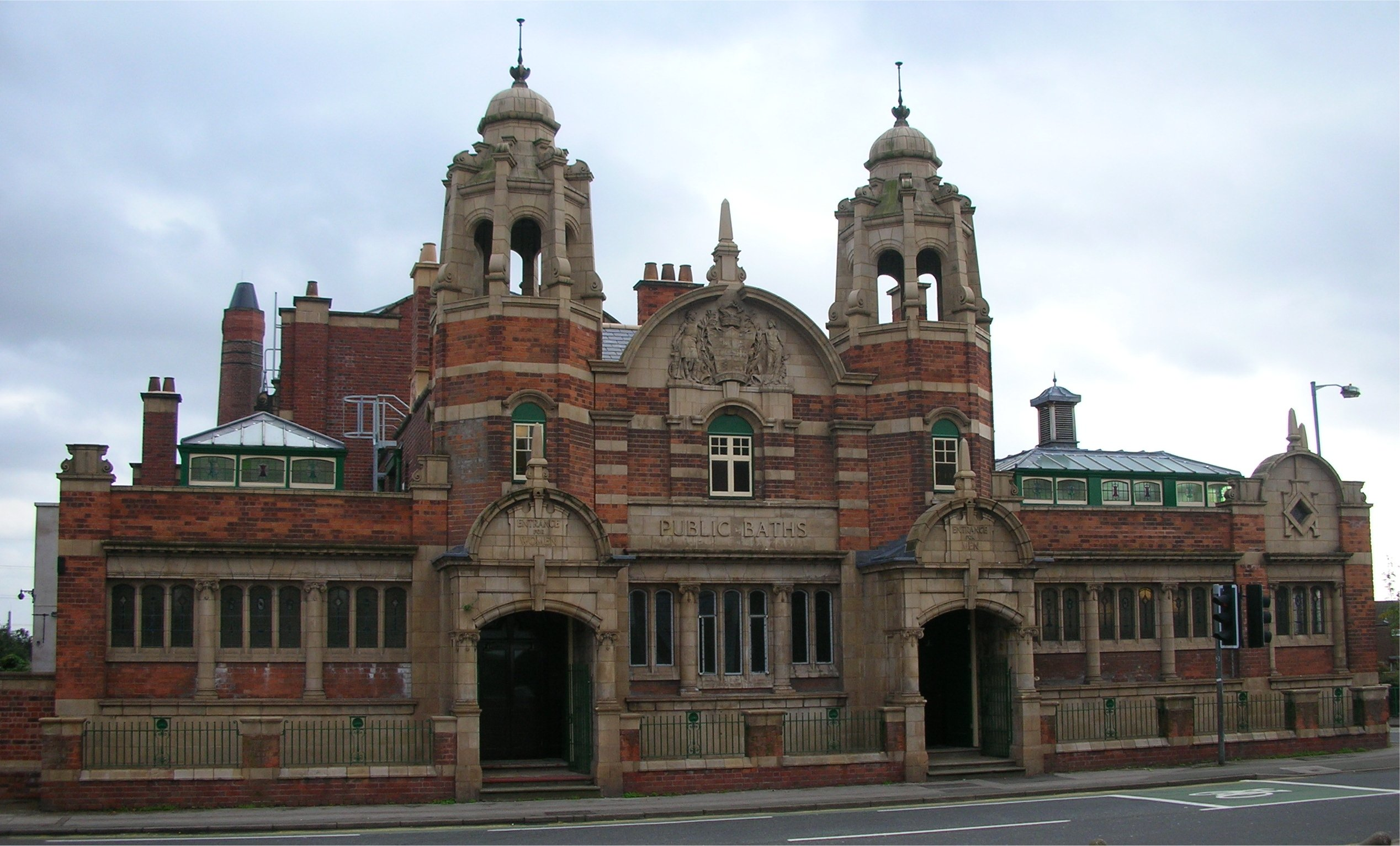
The grade II listed public baths on Nechells Park Road, Nechells.

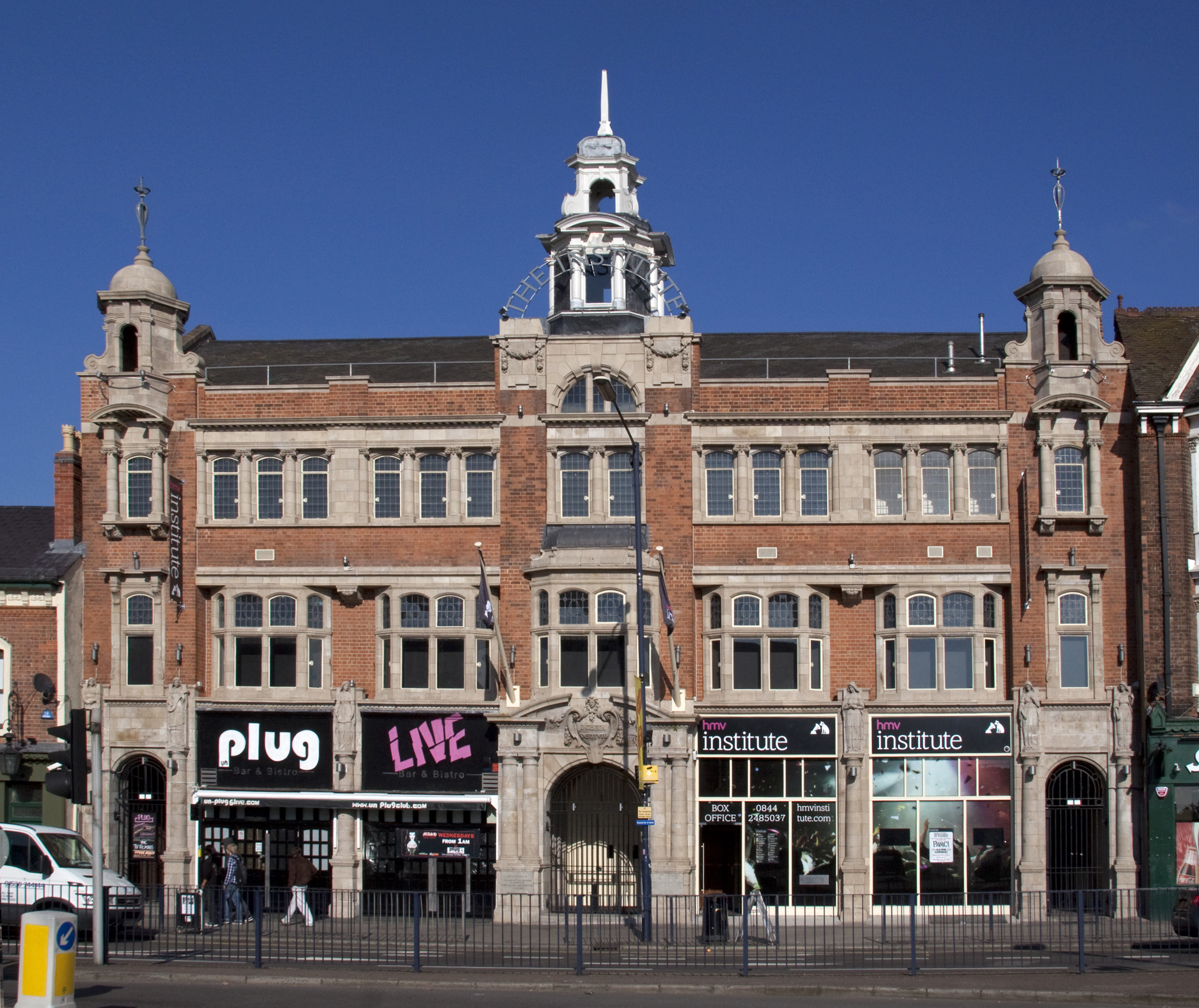
Digbeth Institute

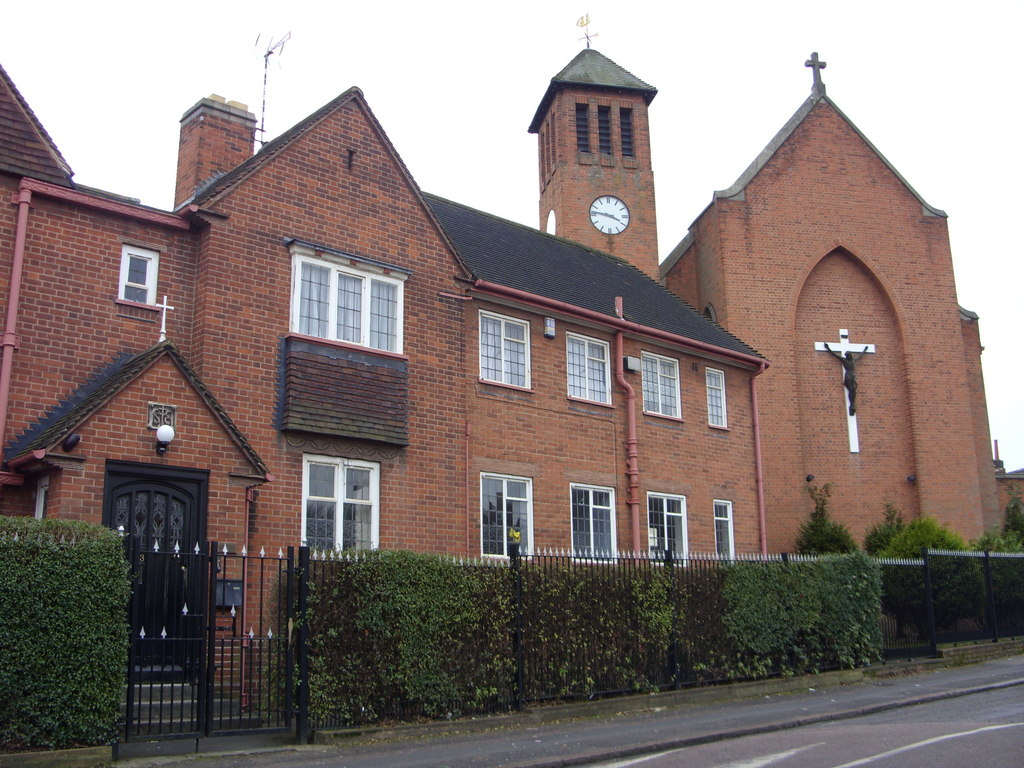
St Elizabeth's Catholic Church, Foleshill

Arthur Harrison (22 January 1862 – 22 August 1922) FRIBA was an architect based in Birmingham, England.

== Life ==
Arthur Harrison was born in Nottingham on 22 January 1862. He trained with William Martin and John Henry Chamberlain in Birmingham before moving as assistant to George A Cox in 1885. He commenced independent practice in Birmingham in 1888 but later was trading as Harrison and Cox with George Bernard Cox.

He was elected FRIBA in 1902 as a result of being President of the Birmingham Architectural Association. He was also President of the Rotary Club of Birmingham.

He died on 22 August 1922 at his country cottage at Welford-on-Avon.

== Works ==
- 28-34 Albert Street, Birmingham. 1888
- Hall Green Junior School, Stratford Road, Hall Green, Birmingham 1892 - 1893
- Primitive Methodist Church, Stratford Road/Wilton Road, Sparkhill 1895
- The Morton Hall, Newmilns, East Ayrshire 1896-97
- Technical Schools, Halesowen 1896-97
- New Connexion Church, Bridgtown, Cannock 1901
- Artisans' Dwellings (Colmore Estate Dwellings), Hospital Street, Birmingham. 1900
- House Mettingham, Anderton Park Road, Moseley 1900.
- Yardley District Council House 1898 - 1902
- Wesleyan Church, Alum Rock Road, Saltley 1904
- St Christopher's Church, Springfield 1907
- Digbeth Institute, Birmingham 1906 - 1908
- Nechells Baths, Birmingham 1910
- Yardley Secondary School, Warwick Road, Tyseley 1910
- Roman Catholic Schools, Chasetown 1914
- St Elizabeth's Roman Catholic Church and Schools, Foleshill, Coventry 1914
- St Thomas' Schools, Granville Street, Birmingham 1915 - 1917
