= Swan Shopping Centre =

- Logo for the Swan Shopping Centre
- Location: Yardley, Birmingham
- Coordinates: 52°27′44.99″N 1°48′49.57″W
- Opened: Spring 2012 (current shopping centre); Early 1960s (original shopping centre)
- Closed: 2009 (original shopping centre)
- Previous names: Tivoli Centre
- Owner: Tesco (Spenhill)
- Floor area: 80,000 square feet (7,400 m^{2})
- Website: https://www.swancentreyardley.co.uk/

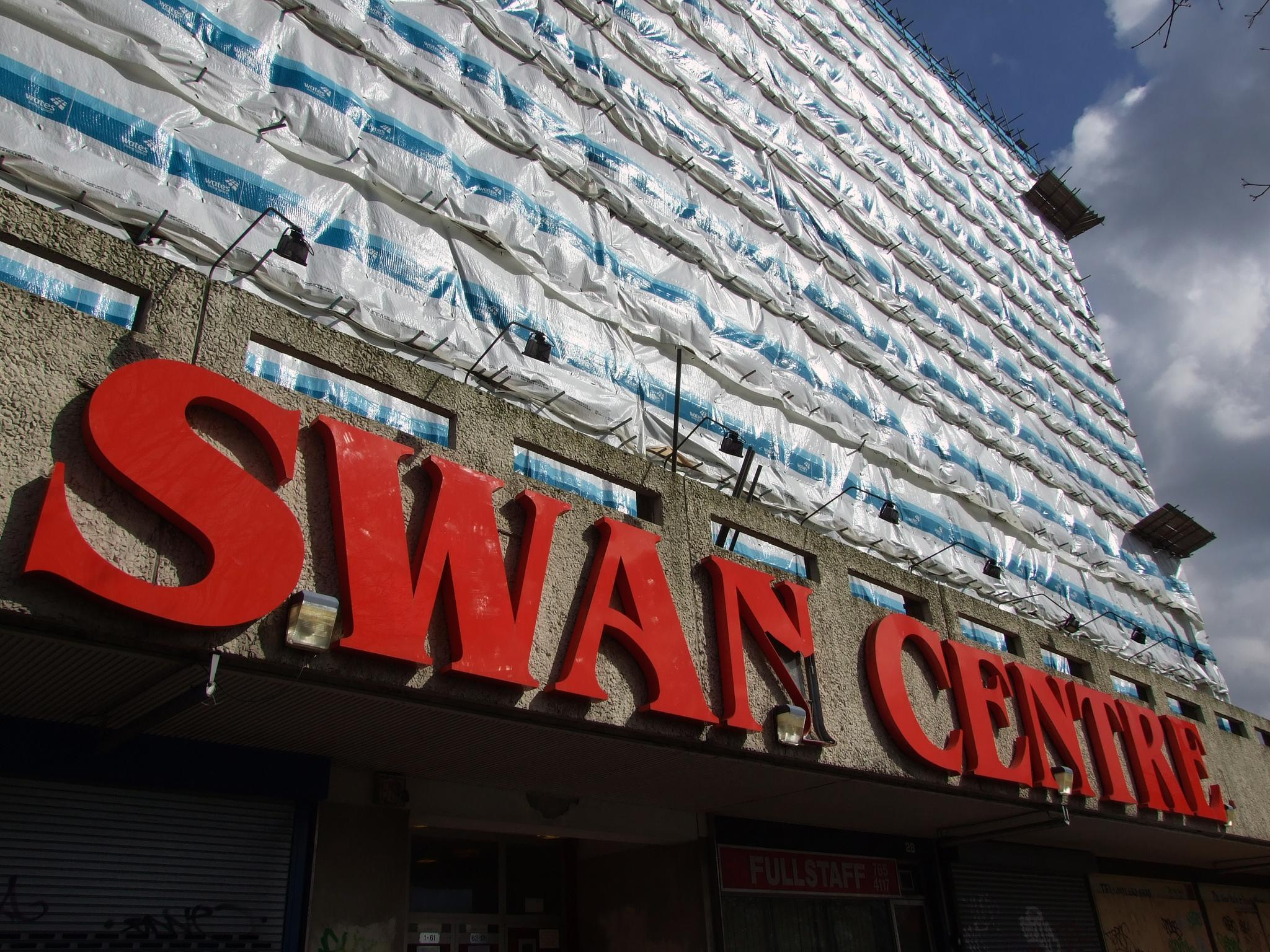
Sign on the old Swan building

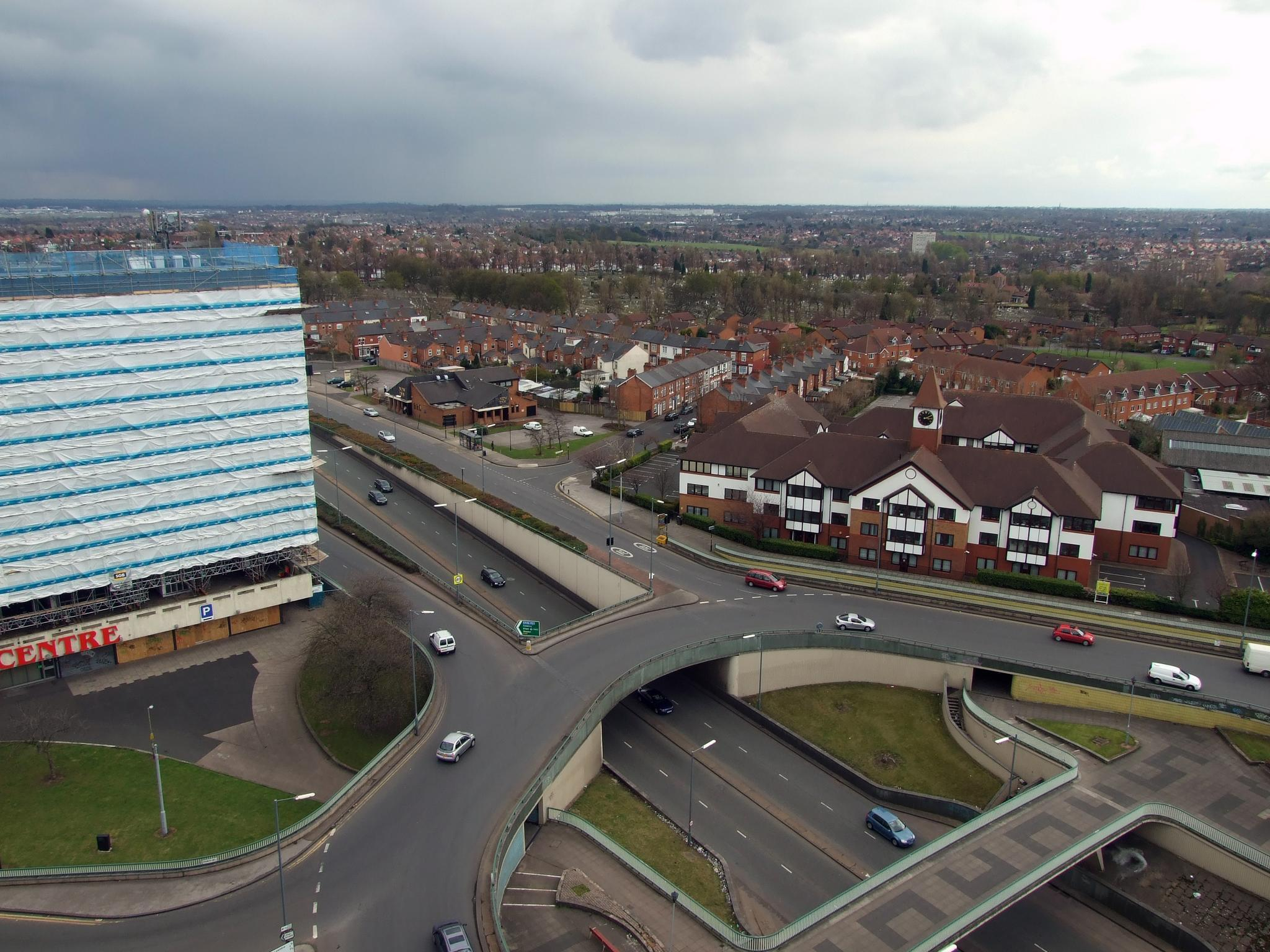
Overhead view of Swan Island

The Swan Shopping Centre is an 80,000 square feet (7,400 m^{2}) shopping centre in Yardley, Birmingham, which opened in Spring 2012.

With its landmark high rise building, it stands on the A45 Coventry Road at its intersection with the A4040 Outer Ring Road (also the Birmingham Outer Circle Number 11 bus route), known as Swan Island.

== original Shopping Centre (Tivoli Centre) ==
The present Swan Shopping Centre replaced an earlier retail complex dating from the early 1960s. The original complex was initially known as the Tivoli Centre before being renamed the Swan Shopping Centre. The original centre closed in 2009 and the site was subsequently redeveloped. The replacement shopping centre opened on 20 February 2012.

== In-store events ==
Since its opening there has been one event inside the Swan Shopping Centre. For the Diamond Jubilee of Elizabeth II weekend, Free Radio hosted a party inside the shopping centre with artificial grass.

== Current stores ==
There are 21 retail units in the shopping centre.
