= Birmingham City Council elections =

British municipal elections

Birmingham City Council elections are held every four years. Birmingham City Council is the local authority for the metropolitan district of Birmingham in the West Midlands, England. Since the last boundary changes in 2018, 101 councillors have been elected from 69 wards. Prior to 2018 elections were held three years out of every four, with a third of the council elected each time.

== Election results ==
Composition of the council
Year	Conservative	Labour	Liberal Democrats (Note: Includes totals for the predecessors of the Liberal Democrats, the Liberal Party and SDP (both of which participated in the Alliance).)	Green (Note: Includes totals for the predecessors of the Green Party of England and Wales, the Ecology Party and Green Party UK.)	Reform	Independents & Others	Council control after election
Local government reorganisation; council established (126 seats)
1973	44	73	9	–	-	0	Labour
1975	55	63	8	0	-	0	No overall control
1976	66	52	8	0	-	0	Conservative
1978	69	49	8	0	-	0	Conservative
1979	63	56	7	0	-	0	No overall control
1980	52	68	6	0	-	0	Labour
New ward boundaries (117 seats)
1982	60	53	4	0	-	0	Conservative
1983	60	55	2	0	-	0	Conservative
1984	52	61	4	0	-	0	Labour
1986	43	70	4	0	-	0	Labour
1987	46	65	6	0	-	0	Labour
1988	43	67	6	0	-	1	Labour
1990	37	68	10	0	-	2	Labour
1991	32	71	12	0	-	2	Labour
1992	43	61	13	0	-	0	Labour
1994	39	63	14	0	-	1	Labour
1995	28	75	14	0	-	0	Labour
1996	13	87	17	0	-	0	Labour
1998	17	83	16	0	-	1	Labour
1999	20	77	16	0	-	3	Labour
2000	28	66	18	0	-	5	Labour
2002	31	67	15	0	-	4	Labour
2003	35	57	23	0	-	2	No overall control
New ward boundaries (120 seats)
2004	39	53	28	0	-	0	No overall control
2006	41	43	33	0	-	3	No overall control
2007	44	41	32	0	-	3	No overall control
2008	49	36	32	0	-	3	No overall control
2010	45	41	31	0	-	3	No overall control
2011	39	55	24	0	-	2	No overall control
2012	28	77	15	0	-	0	Labour
2014	31	77	12	0	-	0	Labour
2015	30	79	11	0	-	0	Labour
2016	29	80	10	0	-	1	Labour
New ward boundaries (101 seats)
2018	25	67	8	1	-	0	Labour
2022	22	65	12	2	0	0	Labour
2026	16	17	12	19	23	14	No overall control

== Council elections ==
- 1998
- 1999
- 2000
- 2002
- 2003
- 2004 (new ward boundaries)
- 2006
- 2007
- 2008
- 2010
- 2011
- 2012
- 2014
- 2015
- 2016
- 2018 (new ward boundaries)
- 2022
- 2026

== Result maps ==
2026

2022

2018

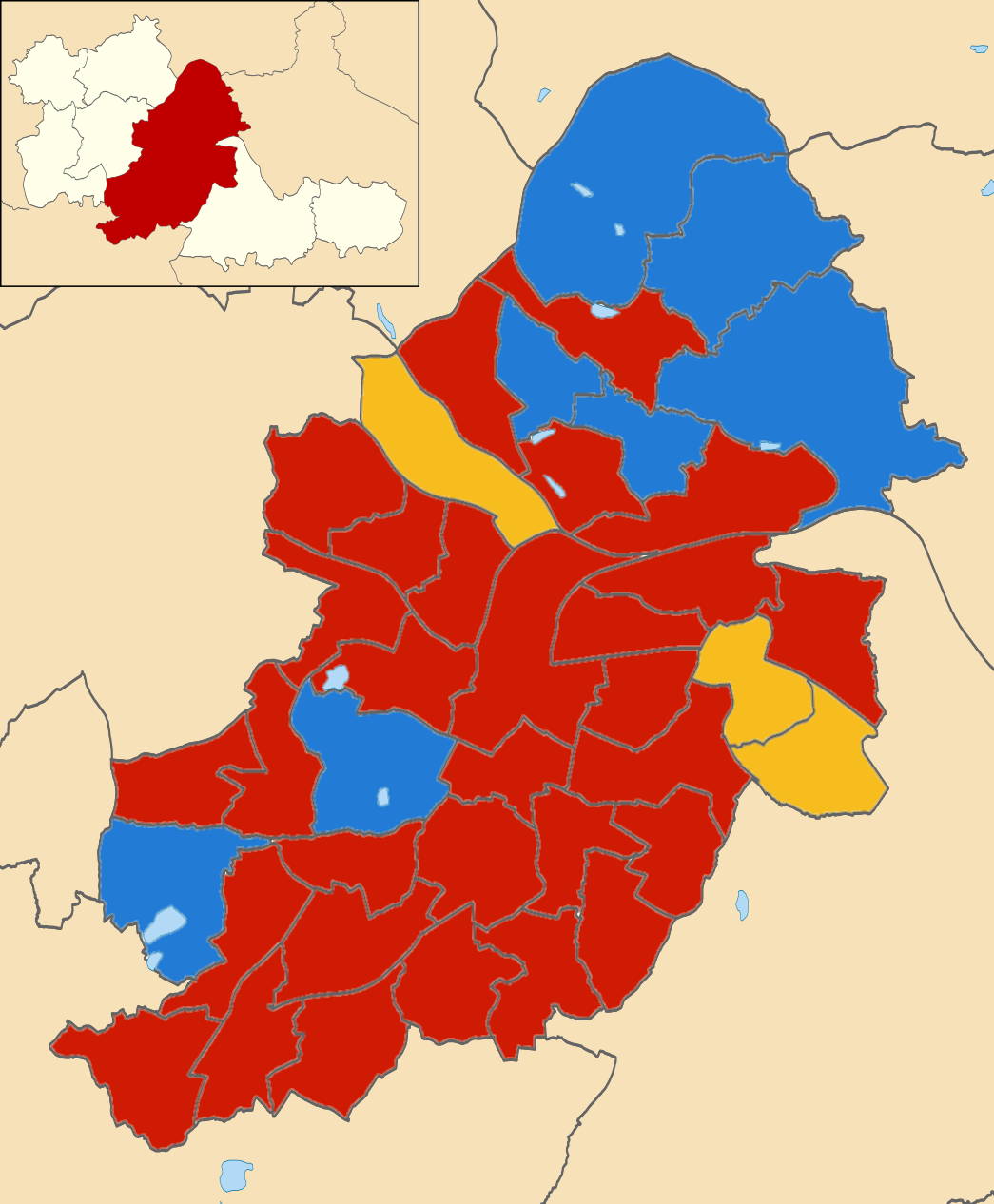
2016

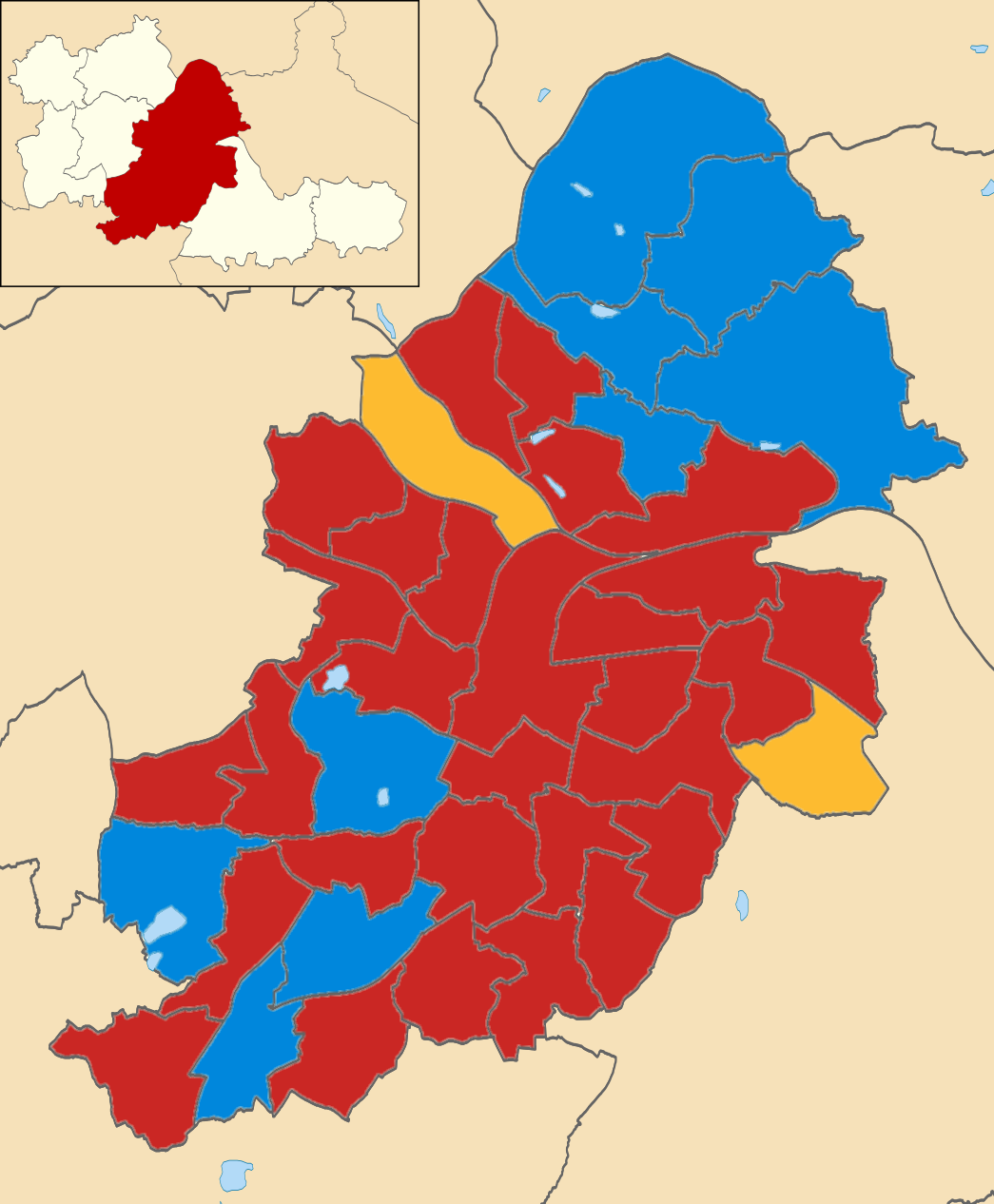
2015

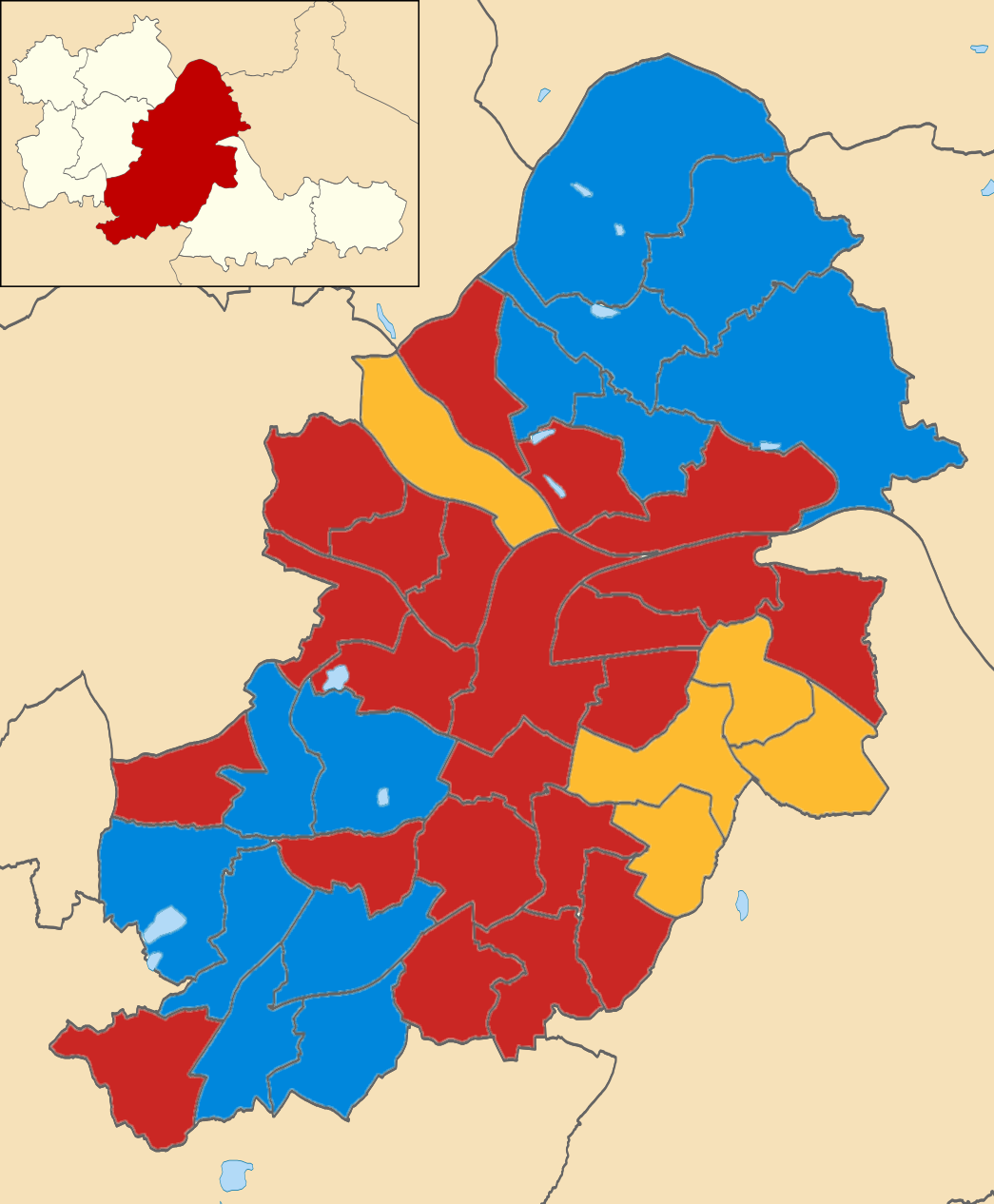
2014

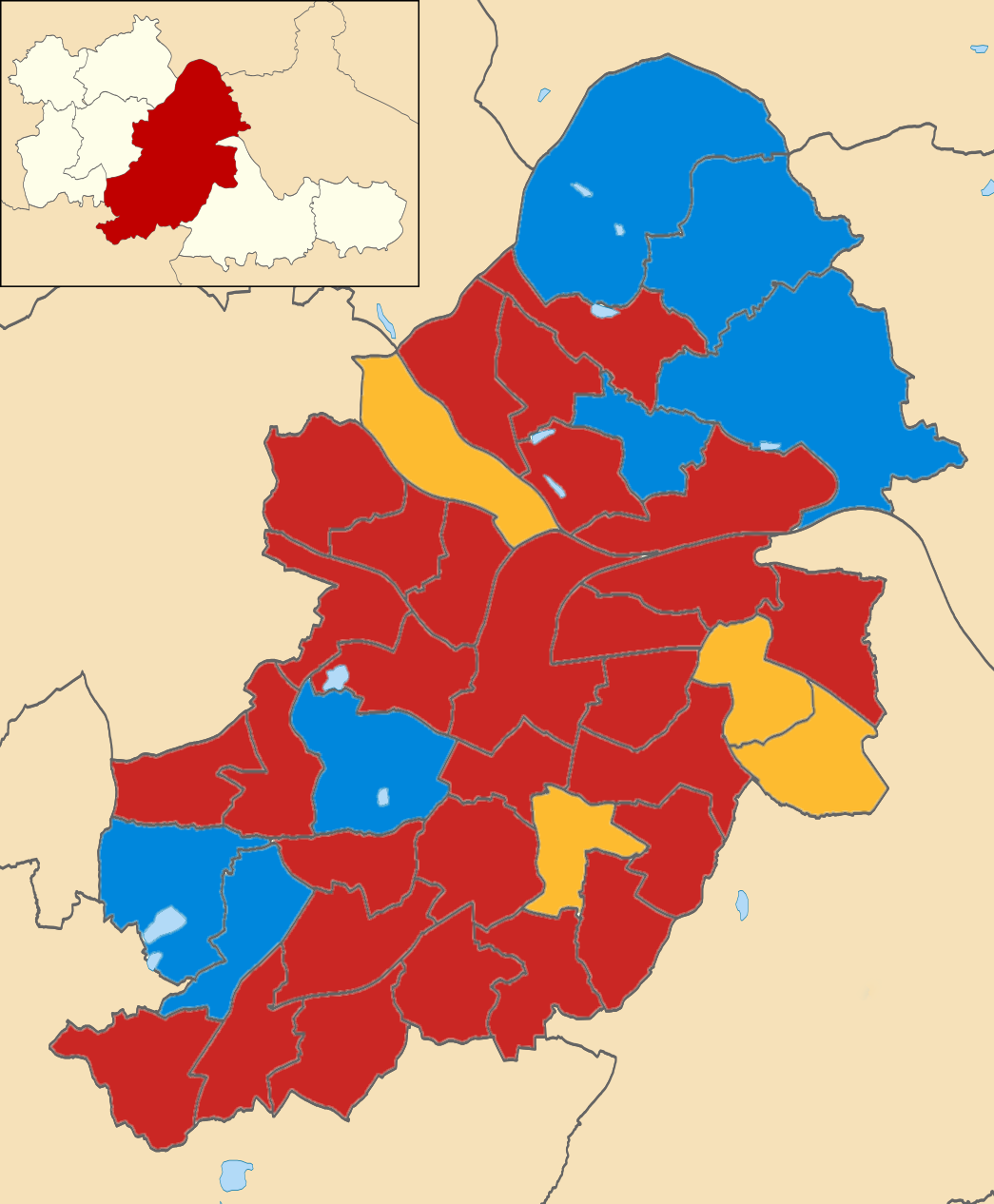
2012

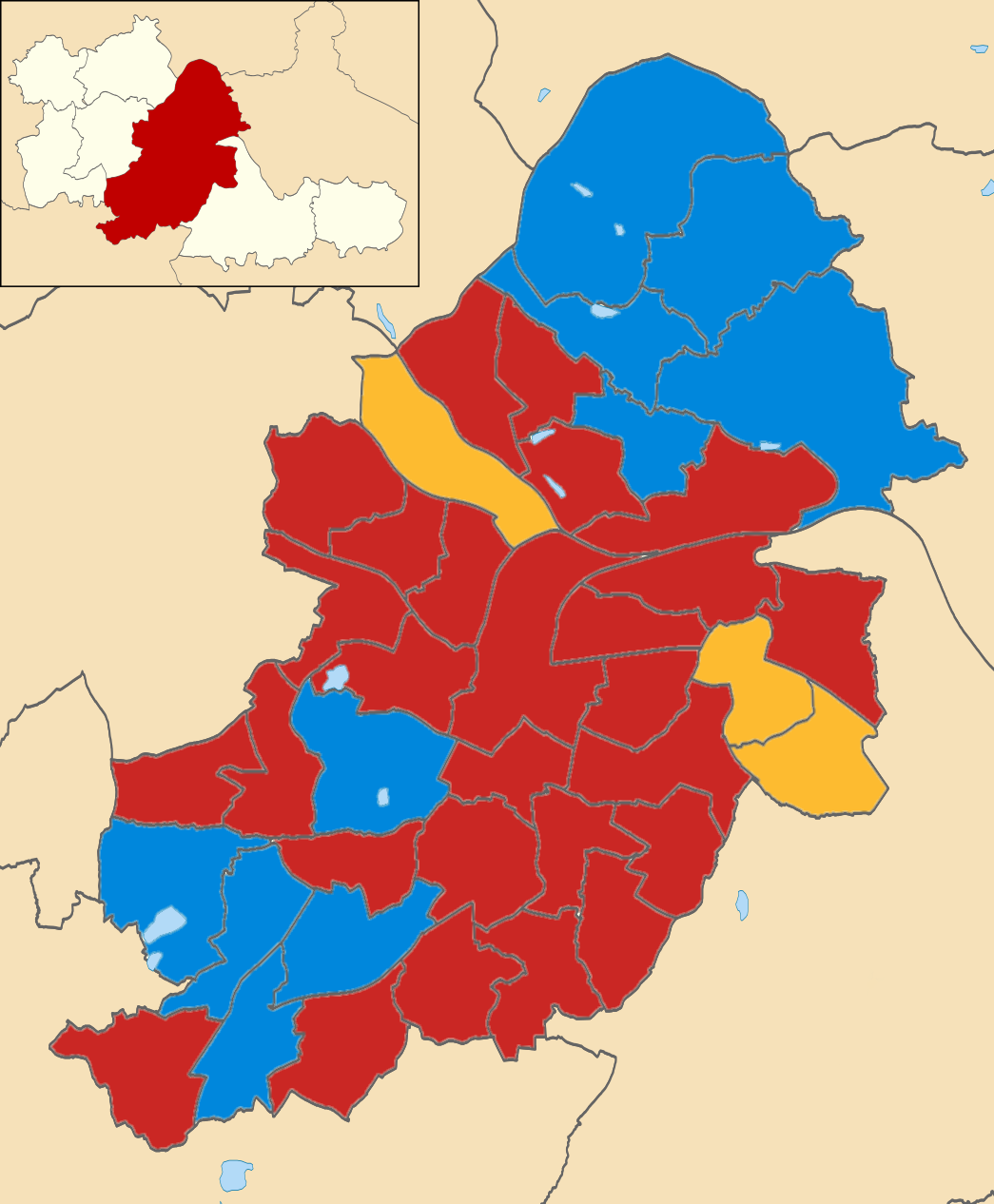
2011

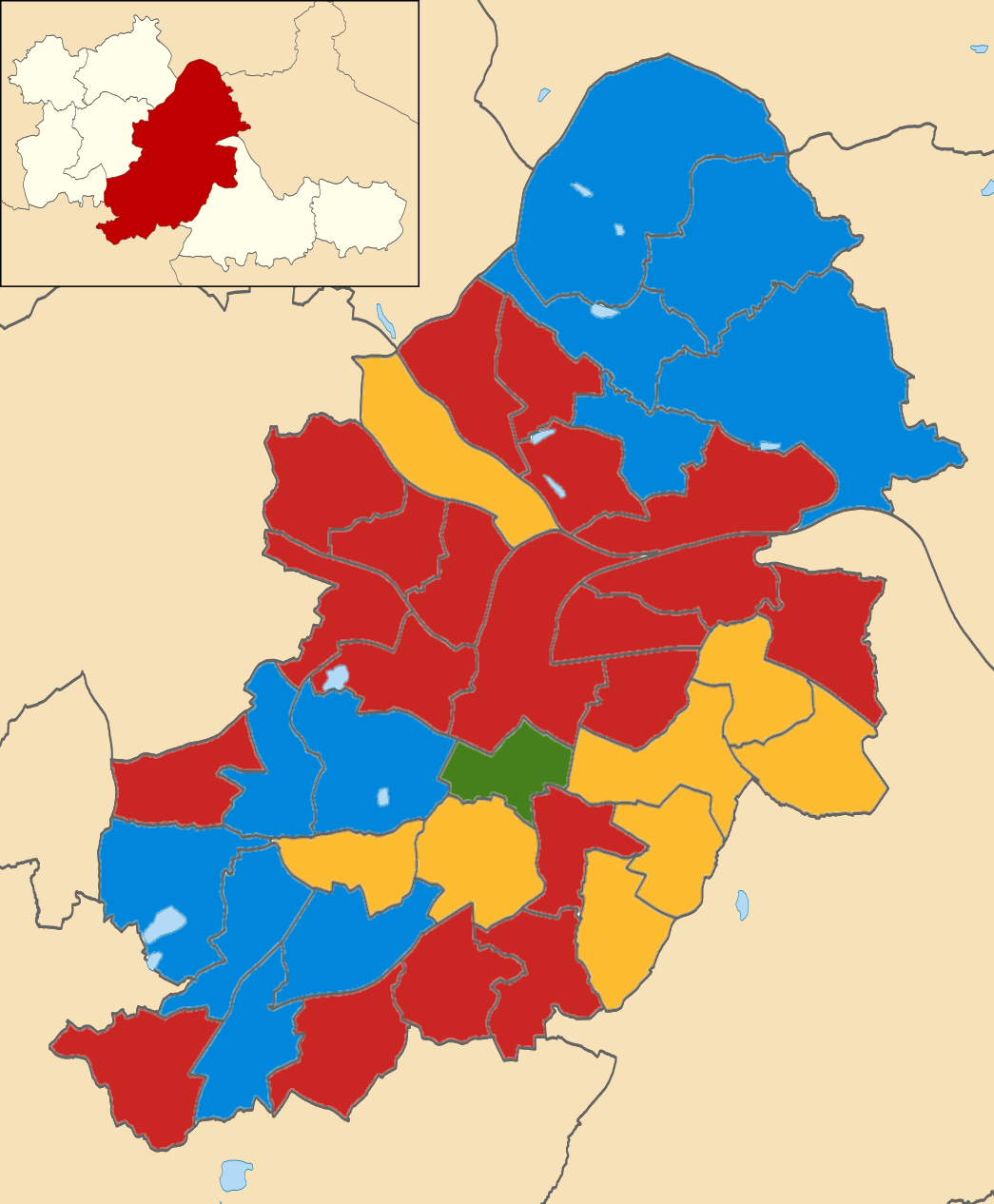
2010

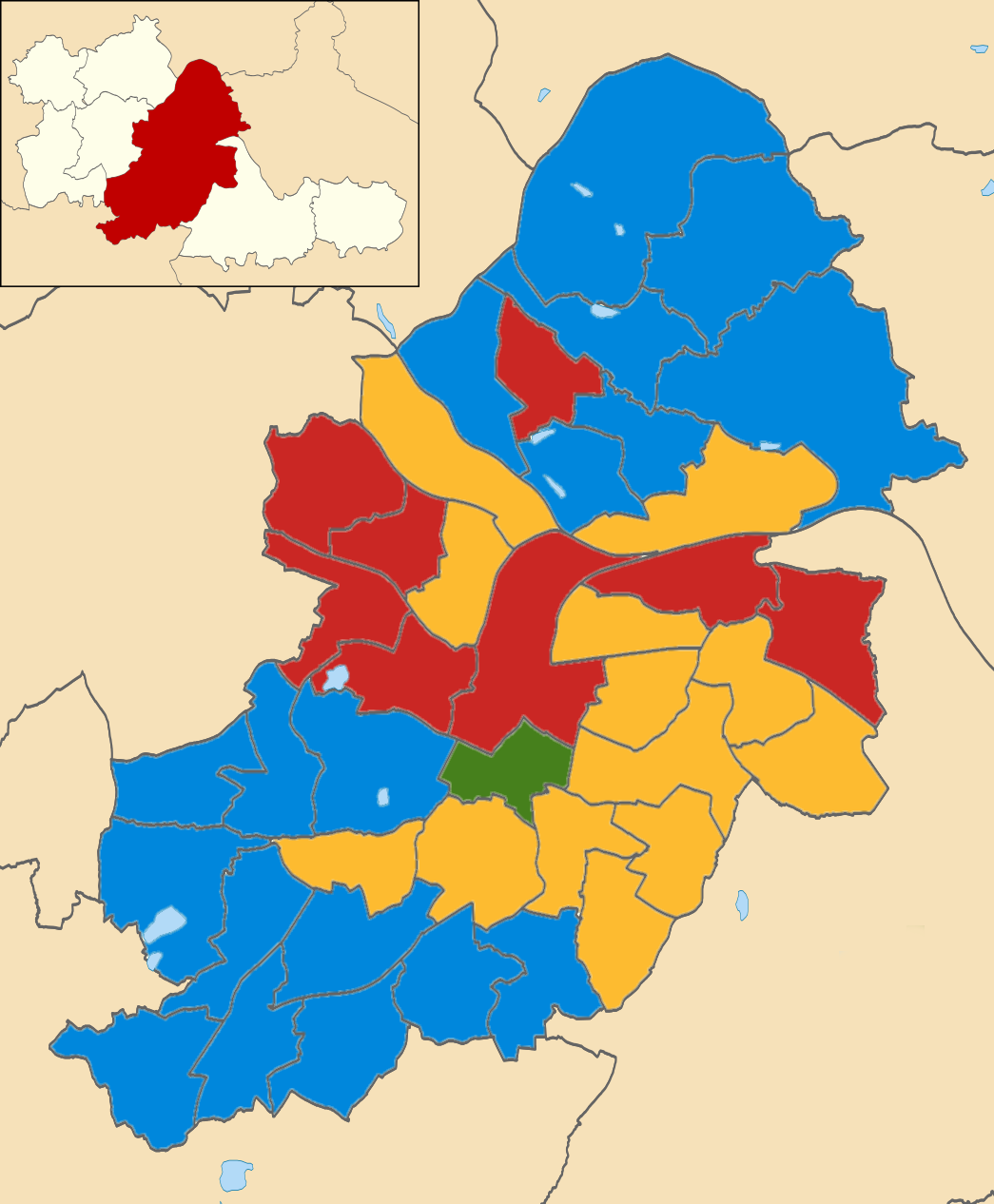
2008

2007

2006

2004

== By-election results ==
=== 2022–2026 ===
Death of Labour Cllr Kerry Jenkins.

Moseley By-election, 23 October 2025
Party	Candidate	Votes	%	±%
Liberal Democrats	Philip Mills	1,634	34.6	▼12.1
Labour	Stephen Pihlaja	1149	24.4	▼14.1
Independent	Carol Williams	923	19.6	▲19.6
Green	Catherine Turner	474	10.1	▲1.6
Reform	Aysan Al-Haq	345	7.3	▲7.3
Conservative	Nayaz Qazi	111	2.4	▼3.9
Birmingham Community Independents	Danny Mazhar	80	1.7	▲1.7
Majority		485	10.3	
Turnout		4,716		
Liberal Democrats gain from Labour		Swing		

Resignation of Labour Cllr Kirsten Kurt-Elli.

Northfield By-election, 4 July 2024
Party	Candidate	Votes	%	±%
Labour	Esther Rai	1,882	40.5	▼16.1
Conservative	Abigail Smith	1,739	37.5	▲2.8
Green	Laura Griffiths	555	12.0	▲7.5
Liberal Democrats	Andrew Moles	467	10.1	▲5.9
Majority		143	3.1	
Turnout		4,643		
Labour hold		Swing		

Resignation of Labour Cllr Alex Aitken.

King's Norton North By-election, 4 July 2024
Party	Candidate	Votes	%	±%
Labour	Carmel Corrigan	1,638	40.6	▼14.8
Conservative	Daniel Molloy-Brookes	1,576	39.0	▲0.1
Green	Claire Hammond	490	12.1	▲8.3
Liberal Democrats	Alex Hemming	335	8.3	▲6.4
Majority		62	1.5	
Turnout		4,039		
Labour hold		Swing		

Resignation of Conservative Cllr Rick Payne (sitting as an independent at the time of resignation).

Kingstanding By-election, 30 May 2024
Party	Candidate	Votes	%	±%
Conservative	Clifton Welch	829	47.9	▲4.6
Labour	Naz Rasheed	680	39.3	▼6.1
Liberal Democrats	Lucy Hayward	82	4.7	▼0.1
Green	Patrick Lee	72	4.2	Steady
Workers Party	Pete Higgins	46	2.7	▲2.7
TUSC	Kris O'Sullivan	20	1.2	▼0.5
Majority		149	8.6	
Turnout		1,729		
Conservative hold		Swing		

Resignation of Labour Cllr Brigid Jones.

Bournbrook and Selly Park By-election, 2 May 2024
Party	Candidate	Votes	%	±%
Labour	Jamie Scott	1,346	39.0	▼22.2
Green	Carla Charles	585	16.9	▼0.3
Conservative	Andrew Hardie	457	13.2	▲3.7
Liberal Democrats	Joe Norris	435	12.6	▲4.9
Independent	Pete Bloomer	405	11.7	▲11.7
Workers Party	Ed Woollard	138	4.0	▲4.0
Socialist Alternative	Corinthia Ward	86	2.5	▲2.5
Majority		761	22.0	
Turnout		3,452		
Labour hold		Swing		

Death of Labour Cllr Mohammed Azim.

Sparkbrook and Balsall Heath East By-election, 6 October 2022
Party	Candidate	Votes	%	±%
Labour	Saima Ahmed	2,410	69.6	▲2.0
Liberal Democrats	Shaukat Khan	517	14.9	▲10.6
Conservative	Zhor Malik	305	8.8	▼14.6
Workers Party	Phil Bevin	158	4.6	▲4.6
Green	Michael Harrison	72	2.1	▼2.5
Majority		1,893	54.7	
Turnout		3,462		
Labour hold		Swing		

=== 2018–2022 ===
Death of Liberal Democrats Cllr Neil Eustace.

Yardley East By-election, 21 October 2021
Party	Candidate	Votes	%	±%
Liberal Democrats	Deborah Harries	1,312	65.3	▲0.4
Labour	Carmel Corrigan	609	30.3	▲0.1
Conservative	Pervez Akhtar	89	4.4	▼0.5
Majority		703	35.0	
Turnout		2,010		
Liberal Democrats hold		Swing		

Resignation of Labour Cllr Lucy Seymour-Smith.

Billesley By-election, 6 May 2021
Party	Candidate	Votes	%	±%
Labour	Katherine Carlisle	2,553	54.0	▲8.0
Conservative	Clair Felton	1,534	32.5	▼8.0
Green	Joseph Peacock	252	5.3	▲0.7
Independent	Nadia Rashid	107	2.3	Steady
Liberal Democrats	Ian Neal	91	1.9	▼2.4
Independent	James Dalton	64	1.4	Steady
Freedom Alliance	John Goss	49	1.0	Steady
Reform	Ian Bishop	42	0.9	Steady
TUSC	Abdul Haq	34	0.7	Steady
Majority		1,019	21.3	
Turnout		4,781		
Rejected ballots		55		
Labour hold		Swing	▲8.0	

Resignation of Labour Cllr Lou Robson.

Hall Green North By-election, 6 May 2021
Party	Candidate	Votes	%	±%
Labour	Saima Suleman	2,542	53.7	▼0.6
Independent	Bob Harvey	833	17.6	▼2.4
Conservative	Pranav Gupta	819	17.3	▲4.8
Green	Chris Garghan	246	5.2	▼1.0
Liberal Democrats	Andy Spruce	242	5.1	▼1.9
TUSC	Eamonn Flynn	55	1.2	▲1.2
Majority		1,709	36.1	
Turnout		4,737		
Labour hold		Swing		

Death of Labour Cllr Keith Linnecor.

Oscott By-election, 6 May 2021
Party	Candidate	Votes	%	±%
Conservative	Darius Sandhu	1,981	54.4	▲14.0
Labour	Uzma Ahmed	1,086	29.8	▼21.8
Liberal Democrats	Joshua Bunting	238	6.5	▲2.3
Green	Benjamin Craddock	165	4.5	▲0.7
Independent	Graham Green	112	3.1	▲3.1
TUSC	Ted Woodley	58	1.6	▲1.6
Majority		895	24.6	
Turnout		3,640		
Conservative gain from Labour		Swing		

Resignation of Labour Cllr John Clancy.

Quinton By-election, 6 May 2021
Party	Candidate	Votes	%	±%
Conservative	Dominic Stanford	2,728	48.7	▲6.5
Labour	Elaine Kidney	2,344	41.8	▼2.8
Green	Peter Beck	323	5.8	▼0.8
Liberal Democrats	Stephanie Garrett	182	3.2	▼3.4
TUSC	Mia Wroe	27	0.5	▲0.5
Majority		384	6.9	
Turnout		5,604		
Conservative gain from Labour		Swing		

=== 2014–2018 ===
Resignation of Labour Cllr Sam Burden.

Hall Green By-election, 4 May 2017
Party	Candidate	Votes	%	±%
Labour	Liz Clements	3,138	42.0	
Liberal Democrats	Tanveer Choudhry	1,889	25.2	
Conservative	Obaid Khan	1,683	22.5	
UKIP	Alan Blumenthal	462	6.1	
Green	Gareth Courage	307	4.1	
Majority		1,249	16.7	
Turnout		7,479	39.0	
Labour hold		Swing		

Death of Lib Dem Cllr Ray Hassall.

Perry Barr By-election, 4 May 2017
Party	Candidate	Votes	%	±%
Liberal Democrats	Morriam Jan	2,387	44.1	
Labour	Mohammed Hanif	2,156	39.8	
Conservative	Minu Sungu	558	10.3	
Green	Matthew Ford	314	5.8	
Majority		231	4.3	
Turnout		5,415	33.7	
Liberal Democrats hold		Swing		

=== 2010–2014 ===
Resignation of Labour Cllr Cath Grundy.

Kingstanding By-election, 13 February 2014
Party	Candidate	Votes	%	±%
Conservative	Gary Sambrook	1,571	47.0	▲7.3
Labour	Lorraine Owen	1,433	42.8	▼6.9
UKIP	Roger Tempest	266	7.9	N/A
Liberal Democrats	Graham Lippiatt	43	1.3	▼0.7
National Front	Terry Williams	33	1.0	▲0.2
Majority		138	4.1	
Turnout		3,355	19	
Conservative gain from Labour		Swing		

Sparkbrook By-election, 10 November 2011
Party	Candidate	Votes	%	±%
Labour	Victoria Quinn	3,932	56.7	▲6.9
Respect	Mohammed Ishtiaq	2,301	33.2	▼5.6
Liberal Democrats	Adil Rashid	395	5.7	▼0.8
Green	Peter Tinsley	179	2.6	▲0.4
Conservative	Sahar Rezazadeh	133	1.9	▼0.8
Majority		1,631	23.5	
Turnout		6,965	33.0	
Labour gain from Respect		Swing		

=== 2006–2010 ===
Sutton New Hall By-election, 22 October 2009
Party	Candidate	Votes	%	±%
Conservative	David Barrie	1,633	58.3	▼8.8
Labour	Robert Pocock	505	18.0	▲5.6
UKIP	Maddy Westrop	344	12.3	▲12.3
Liberal Democrats	Robert Hardware	319	11.4	▲2.7
Majority		1,128	40.3	
Turnout		2,801	15.9	
Conservative hold		Swing		

Sparkbrook By-election, 17 September 2009
Party	Candidate	Votes	%	±%
Respect	Shokat Ali	2,495	39.6	▼7.0
Labour	Mohammed Azim	2,228	35.4	▼1.3
Conservative	Abdul Kadir	799	12.7	▲7.5
Liberal Democrats	Naeem Qureshi	506	8.0	▲1.5
Green	Charles Alldrick	213	3.4	▲3,4
Independent	Sakander Mahmood	55	0.9	▲0.9
Majority		267	4.2	
Turnout		6,296	32.3	
Respect hold		Swing		

Lozells and East Handsworth By-election, 4 June 2009
Party	Candidate	Votes	%	±%
Labour	Hendrina Quinnen	3,018	42.2	▲31.1
Liberal Democrats	Sabirul Islam	2,000	28.0	▲15.1
Conservative	Raja Khan	1,622	22.7	▼22.9
Green	Ankaret Harmer	297	4.2	▼8.6
UKIP	Melvin Ward	208	2.9	▲2.9
Majority		1,018	14.2	
Turnout		7,145	38.8	
Labour hold		Swing		

Brandwood By-election, 20 September 2007
Party	Candidate	Votes	%	±%
Labour	Michael Leddy	1,998	42.7	▲9.1
Conservative	Ken Axford	1,663	35.6	▼4.2
BNP	Robert Purcell	290	6.2	▼2.7
Liberal Democrats	Brian Peace	285	6.1	▼4.9
Green	Anna Masters	193	4.1	▼2.6
Independent	Frank Chance	157	3.4	▲3.4
UKIP	Francois Jones	64	1.4	▲1.4
New Nationalist Party	Keith Axon	25	0.5	▲0.5
Majority		335	7.1	
Turnout		4,675	26.2	
Labour gain from Conservative		Swing		

=== 2002–2006 ===
Tyburn By-election, 8 September 2005
Party	Candidate	Votes	%	±%
Labour	Lynda Clinton	1,451	52.4	▲19.3
Conservative	Gerald Brien	982	35.5	▲12.5
Liberal Democrats	John Line	334	12.1	▼4.3
Majority		469	16.9	
Turnout		2,767	15.0	
Labour hold		Swing		

Aston By-election, 28 July 2005 (3 seats)
Party	Candidate	Votes	%	±%
Liberal Democrats	Ayoub Khan	2,081		
Liberal Democrats	Abdul Aziz	2,044		
Liberal Democrats	Abdul Khalique	1,905		
Labour	Ziaul Islam	1,896		
Labour	Anthony Kennedy	1,843		
Labour	Changese Khan	1,578		
Conservative	Raja Iqbal	282		
Green	Anna Dunstan	182		
Conservative	David Williams-Masinda	166		
Conservative	Mohammed Mushtaq	148		
Turnout		12,125	25.9	
Liberal Democrats gain from Labour		Swing		
Liberal Democrats gain from Labour		Swing		
Liberal Democrats gain from Labour		Swing		

Bordesley Green By-election, 28 July 2005 (3 seats)
Party	Candidate	Votes	%	±%
People's Justice	Shaukat Ali	2,241		
Labour	Shafique Shah	2,183		
People's Justice	Saeed Mohammed	2,065		
People's Justice	Choudhry Ullah	2,041		
Labour	Zulfiqar Khan	2,009		
Labour	Stewart Stacey	1,875		
Liberal Democrats	Qamar Nawaz	1,372		
Liberal Democrats	Nazar Hussain	1,117		
Liberal Democrats	Azad Aslam	1,058		
Green	Alan Clawley	314		
Conservative	David Fazakerley	251		
Conservative	Mohammed Shariff-Malik	154		
Conservative	Jasbir Singh	153		
Turnout		16,833	31.3	
People's Justice gain from Labour		Swing		
Labour hold		Swing		
People's Justice gain from Labour		Swing		

Moseley & Kings Heath By-election, 5 May 2005
Party	Candidate	Votes	%	±%
Labour	Barry Henley	4,162	37.4	▲7.3
Liberal Democrats	Zaman Khan	3,898	35.1	▲4.0
Conservative	Barry Hands	1,889	16.9	Steady
Green	Stuart Masters	1,184	10.6	▲5.7
Majority		264	2.3	
Turnout		11,133	61.1	
Labour hold		Swing		

=== 1998–2002 ===
Stockland Green By-election, 20 November 2003
Party	Candidate	Votes	%	±%
Labour	Sarah-Jayne Plant	1,377	43.0	▼4.0
Liberal Democrats	Anthony Foley	759	23.7	▲5.0
Conservative	Derek Green	512	16.0	▼6.0
BNP	Robert Purcell	503	15.7	▲15.7
Socialist Alliance	Maria Werson	48	1.5	▲1.5
Majority		618	19.3	
Turnout		3,199	18.1	
Labour hold		Swing		

Hodge Hill By-election, 28 February 2002
Party	Candidate	Votes	%	±%
Labour	John Clancy	1,172	42.5	▲13.7
Conservative		1,044	37.9	▼15.1
Liberal Democrats		287	10.4	▼7.8
UKIP		255	9.2	▲9.2
Majority		128	4.6	
Turnout		2,758	15.0	
Labour gain from Conservative		Swing		

Kingsbury By-election, 11 October 2001
Party	Candidate	Votes	%	±%
Labour	Michael Sharpe	1,113	57.2	▲5.5
Conservative	Craig Smeaton	679	34.9	▼4.0
Liberal Democrats	Emily Rohaise	105	5.4	▼4.1
Socialist Alliance	Steven Godward	37	1.9	▲1.9
UKIP	Alan Ware	13	0.7	▲0.7
Majority		434	22.3	
Turnout		1,947	16.6	
Labour hold		Swing		

Fox Hollies By-election, 7 June 2001
Party	Candidate	Votes	%	±%
Labour	Matthew Redmond	4,311	52.5	▲20.2
Liberal Democrats	Penelope Wagg	2,838	34.6	▼23.1
Conservative	Paul Burke	1,010	12.3	▲0.2
Majority		1,473	17.9	
Turnout		8,159	48.2	
Labour gain from Liberal Democrats		Swing		

Death of Labour Cllr David Wells.

Stockland Green By-election, 15 July 1999
Party	Candidate	Votes	%	±%
Labour	Margaret Langley	1,369	70.2	▲9.9
Conservative	Paul Valdmanis	432	22.1	▼0.6
Justice for the Elderly	Christopher F S Rose	229	11.7	▲6.7
Liberal Democrats	Derek P Parsons	148	7.6	▼4.4
Majority		937	48.1	
Turnout		2,178	12.0	
Labour hold		Swing		

=== 1994-1998 ===
Death of Labour Cllr Anthony Rust.

Harborne By-election, 11 September 1997
Party	Candidate	Votes	%	±%
Conservative	Mike Whitby	2,719	53.4	▲8.5
Labour	Stephen Cormell	1,859	36.5	▼6.8
Liberal Democrats	Conall Boyle	420	8.2	▼1.3
Green	Peter Beck	96	1.9	▼0.4
Majority		860	16.9	
Turnout		5,094	29.0	
Conservative gain from Labour		Swing		

Aston By-election, 10 July 1997
Party	Candidate	Votes	%	±%
Labour		2,623	80.2	▲16.0
Liberal Democrats		426	13.0	▲5.6
Conservative		221	6.8	▼4.9
Majority		2,197	67.2	
Turnout		3,270		
Labour hold		Swing		

King's Norton By-election, 10 July 1997
Party	Candidate	Votes	%	±%
Labour		1,731	64.9	▲3.5
Conservative		700	26.3	▼1.5
Liberal Democrats		184	6.9	▼4.0
BNP		50	1.9	▲1.9
Majority		1,031	38.6	
Turnout		2,665	16.4	
Labour hold		Swing		

Death of Lib Dem Cllr Neil Biddlestone.

Acocks Green By-election, 30 January 1997
Party	Candidate	Votes	%	±%
Liberal Democrats	James Whorwood	3,134	59.9	
Labour	Brenden O'Brien	1,626	31.1	
Conservative	Peter Osborn	407	7.8	
UKIP	Alan Ware	60	1.1	
Majority		1,508	26.1	
Turnout		5,227	26.2	
Liberal Democrats hold		Swing		

Yardley By-election, 7 November 1996
Party	Candidate	Votes	%	±%
Liberal Democrats	Barbara Jackson	3,285	67.5	
Labour	Lewis Berry	1,191	24.4	
Conservative	Bryan Brooke	395	8.1	
Majority		2,094	42.9	
Turnout		4,871	27.5	
Liberal Democrats hold		Swing		

Death of Labour Cllr Edward Rochford.

Hodge Hill By-election, 11 January 1996
Party	Candidate	Votes	%	±%
Labour	Anita Ward	1,240	52.0	
Conservative	Barry Hands	790	33.2	
Liberal Democrats	Sean Hagan	352	14.8	
Majority		450	18.9	
Turnout		2,382	12.6	
Labour hold		Swing		

Death of Labour Cllr Paul Haymeraj.

Small Heath By-election, 12 May 1994
Party	Candidate	Votes	%	±%
Labour	Douglas McCarrick	3,268	62.0	
Small Heath Res	Kenneth Greaves	920	17.5	
Conservative	Nasreen Kayani	861	16.3	
Green	Alan Clawley	181	3.4	
Natural Law	Tessa Portsmouth	37	0.7	
Majority		2,348	44.6	
Turnout		5,267	25.6	
Labour hold		Swing		

=== 1990-1994 ===
Death of Conservative Cllr Arthur Walker.

Quinton By-election, 24 March 1994
Party	Candidate	Votes	%	±%
Labour	Richard Bashford	2,919	46.6	
Conservative	Edward Grant	2,625	41.9	
Liberal Democrats	Susan Sherwen	529	8.4	
Green	Peter Beck	195	3.1	
Majority		294	0.1	
Turnout		5,267	39.4	
Labour gain from Conservative		Swing		

Death of Conservative Cllr Clare Fancote.

Sutton Vesey By-election, 9 September 1993
Party	Candidate	Votes	%	±%
Conservative	John Hood	3,539	45.8	
Liberal Democrats	Marie Cope	3,118	40.3	
Labour	Frank Hooley	797	10.3	
National Front	Louise Holland	171	2.2	
Monster Raving Loony	Tessa Portsmouth	104	1.4	
Majority		421	0.1	
Turnout		7,729	33.7	
Conservative hold		Swing		

Resignation of Labour Cllr Khalid Mahmood.

Sparkbrook By-election, 22 April 1993
Party	Candidate	Votes	%	±%
Labour	Anthony Kennedy	2,232	55.9	
Conservative	Aziz-ul Hassan	1,306	32.7	
Liberal Democrats	Sean Hagan	311	7.8	
Green	Charles Alldrick	147	3.7	
Majority		926	23.2	
Turnout		3,996	24.0	
Labour hold		Swing		

Resignation of Lib Dem Cllr Paul Shefield.

Acock's Green By-election, 11 February 1993
Party	Candidate	Votes	%	±%
Liberal Democrats	Neil Biddlestone	3,462	62.1	
Labour	Ian Jamieson	1,407	25.2	
Conservative	Clifford Beasley	705	12.6	
Majority		2,055	36.8	
Turnout		5,577	27.6	
Liberal Democrats hold		Swing		

Resignation of Labour Cllr Fred Grattidge.

Fox Hollies By-Election 11 February 1993
Party	Candidate	Votes	%	±%
Labour	Stanley Yapp	1,539	47.2	
Conservative	Leonard Kirby	937	28.7	
Liberal Democrats	Nicola Henry	782	24.0	
Majority		602	18.4	
Turnout		3,261	18.6	
Labour hold		Swing		

=== Before 1990 ===
Erdington By-Election 25 October 1973
Party	Candidate	Votes	%	±%
Labour	Graham Vickers	3,179		
Conservative	Donald Bailey	1,770		
Liberal Democrats	Dennis Pearson	1,716		
National Front	Reginald Barlow	371		
Majority		1,409		
Turnout				
Labour hold		Swing		
