= 2015 Birmingham City Council election =

2015 UK local government election

← 2014	7 May 2015	2016 →

One third (40) seats to Birmingham City Council + 1 byelection 61 seats needed for a majority

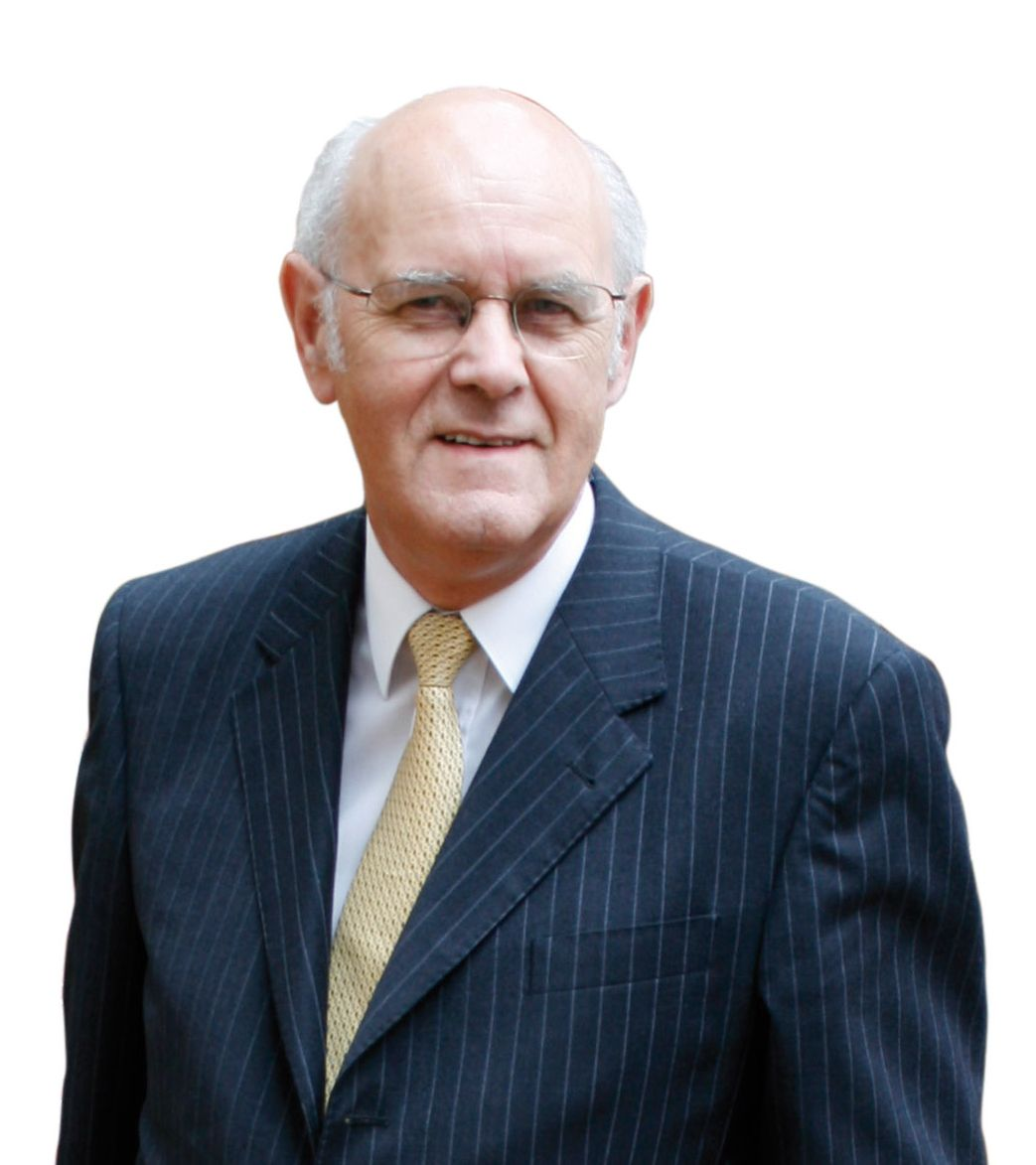
	First party	Second party	Third party
Leader	Albert Bore	Robert Alden	Paul Tilsley
Party	Labour	Conservative	Liberal Democrats
Leader's seat	Ladywood	Erdington	Sheldon
Seats won	79	30	11
Seat change	▲2	▼1	▼1
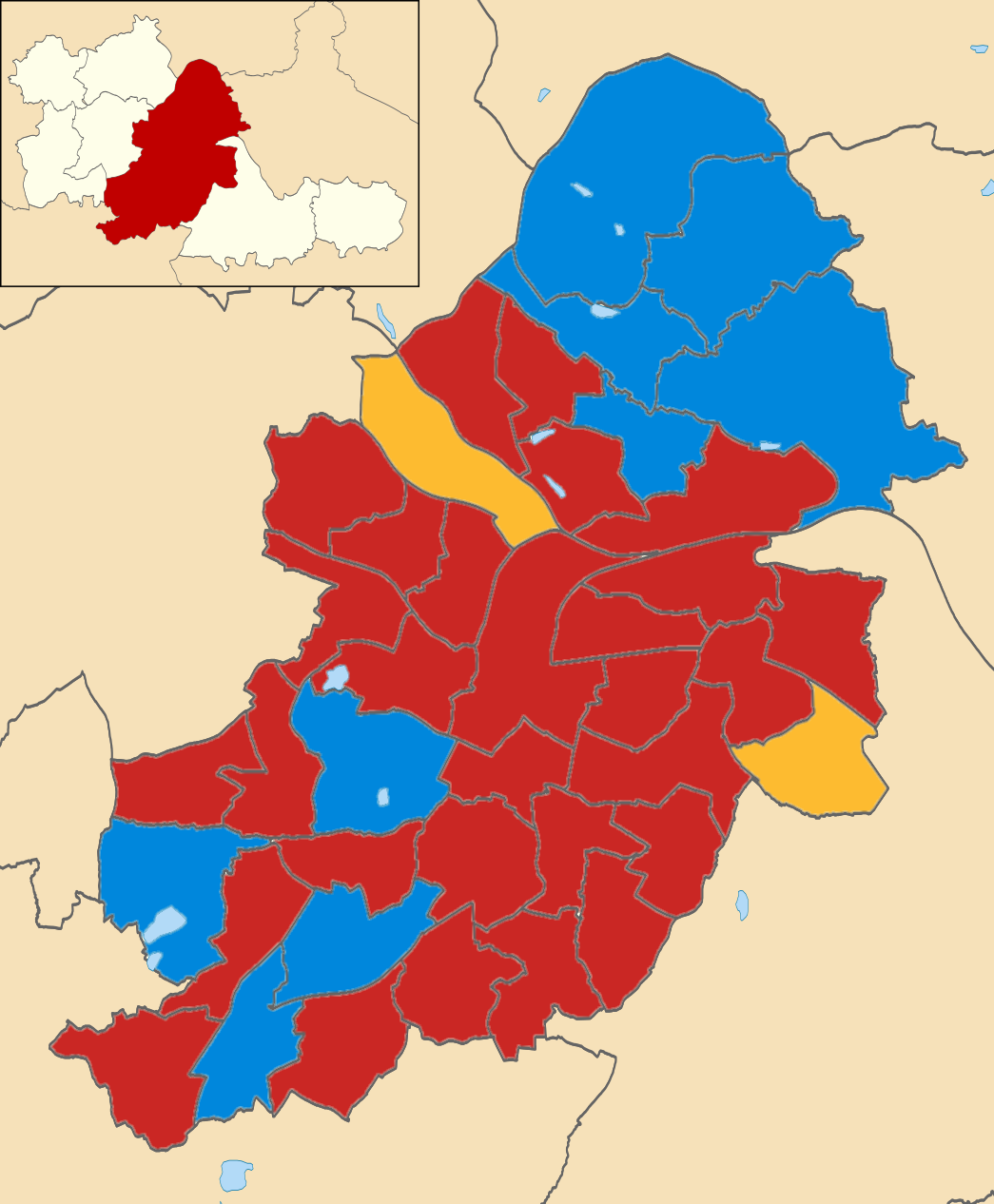
- 2015 local election results in Birmingham.
Council control before election
Labour
Council control after election
Labour

The 2015 Birmingham City Council election took place on 7 May 2015 to elect members of Birmingham City Council in England. This was on the same day as other local elections, and also the 2015 UK General Election.

In Birmingham, the Labour Party went against the trend across the United Kingdom, as they lost the General Election the Labour Party managed to strengthen its hold on Birmingham City Council as well as performing well in the Westminster seats. This is despite the problems facing the Council in the form of the recent Operation Trojan Horse scandal and the Kerslake review, which was highly critical of Birmingham City Council. Albert Bore (Labour Group leader) said the Labour Party did well in Birmingham because it was honest and open with the people of Birmingham and that the people of Birmingham felt they had been unfairly targeted by the Conservative-led government.

All results compared to 2012, which is the term that expired in 2015. In 2011 Respect, who did not contest this election, were the main opposition to Labour in a few safe seats.

== Result ==
Birmingham City Council Election Result 2015
Party	Seats	Gains	Losses	Net gain/loss	Seats %	Votes %	Votes	+/−
Labour	29	▲2	0	▲2	70.7	46.0	199,871	
Conservative	10	0	▼1	▼1	24.4	26.9	116,680	
Liberal Democrats	2	0	▼1	▼1	4.9	10.1	43,898	
UKIP	0	Steady	Steady	0	0.0	11.4	49,673	
Green	0	Steady	Steady	0	0.0	4.7	20,444	
TUSC	0	Steady	Steady	0	0.0	0.4	1,619	
Independent	0	Steady	Steady	0	0.0	0.4	1,549	
Socialist Labour	0	Steady	Steady	0	0.0	0.0	179	
NHA	0	Steady	Steady	0	0.0	0.0	96	
Patriotic Socialist Party	0	Steady	Steady	0	0.0	0.0	88	
SDP	0	Steady	Steady	0	0.0	0.0	46	

== Result by Ward ==
The electoral division results listed below are based on the changes from the last time this third was up for election, in the 2011 elections, not taking into account any mid-term by-elections or party defections.

=== Acocks Green ===
Acocks Green 2015
Party	Candidate	Votes	%	±%
Labour	Stewart Stacey	4,741	44.3	▼3.7
Liberal Democrats	Penny Wagg	2,846	26.6	▼6.9
UKIP	Gerry Moynihan	1,390	13.0	▲8.7
Conservative	Richard Sparkes	1,174	11.0	▲1.6
Green	Amanda Baker	397	3.7	▼0.6
TUSC	Eamonn Flynn	108	1.0	N/A
SDP	Peter Johnson	46	0.4	N/A
Majority		1,895	17.7	
Turnout		10,702		
Labour hold		Swing	▲1.6	

=== Aston ===
Aston 2015
Party	Candidate	Votes	%	±%
Labour	Muhammad Afzal	8,388	83.6	▲21.2
Conservative	Joel Buckett	693	6.9	▲2.7
Liberal Democrats	Rezaul Billah	479	4.8	▼25.1
Green	Hazel Clawley	474	4.7	▲1.8
Majority		7,695	76.7	
Turnout		10,034		
Labour hold		Swing	▲9.3	

=== Bartley Green ===
Bartley Green 2015
Party	Candidate	Votes	%	±%
Conservative	John Lines	4,553	46.7	▼8.4
Labour	Aaron Mansfield	3,046	31.2	▼1.5
UKIP	Graham Short	1,565	16.1	N/A
Green	Michelle Adams	373	3.8	▲0.5
Liberal Democrats	Julia Garrett	217	2.2	▼0.7
Majority		1,507	15.5	
Turnout		9,754		
Conservative hold		Swing	▼3.5	

=== Billesley ===
Billesley 2015
Party	Candidate	Votes	%	±%
Labour	Susan Barnett	4,876	44.7	▼3.3
Conservative	Steve Mee	2,893	26.5	▼10.1
UKIP	James Dalton	2,215	20.3	N/A
Green	Cheryl Buxton-Sait	492	4.5	▼0.1
Liberal Democrats	Emily Cox	441	4.0	▼0.4
Majority		1,983	18.2	
Turnout		10,917		
Labour hold		Swing	▲3.4	

=== Bordesley Green ===
Bordesley Green 2015
Party	Candidate	Votes	%	±%
Labour	Shafique Shah	8,357	75.2	▲4.5
Liberal Democrats	Adnan Azam	1,569	14.1	▼3.5
Conservative	Parveen Hassan	558	5.0	▲2.3
Green	Alan Clawley	522	5.0	▲3.4
TUSC	Theo Sharieff	81	0.7	N/A
Majority		6,788	61.1	
Turnout		11,117		
Labour hold		Swing	▲4.0	

=== Bournville ===
Bournville 2015
Party	Candidate	Votes	%	±%
Conservative	Tim Huxtable	5,422	40.8	▼1.9
Labour Co-op	Mary Locke	4,840	36.5	▼3.1
Green	Ian Jamieson	1,297	9.8	▲2.1
UKIP	Steven Brookes	1,186	8.9	N/A
Liberal Democrats	Trevor Sword	536	4.0	▼2.8
Majority		582	4.3	
Turnout		13,281		
Conservative hold		Swing	▲0.6	

=== Brandwood ===
Brandwood 2015
Party	Candidate	Votes	%	±%
Labour	Barry Henley	5,381	46.3	▼4.4
Conservative	Neville Summerfield	3,385	29.1	▼3.1
UKIP	Alan Blumenthal	1,699	14.6	N/A
Green	Lizzy Sharman	679	5.8	▲0.1
Liberal Democrats	Christopher Burgess	487	4.2	▼2.0
Majority		1,996	17.2	
Turnout		11,631		
Labour hold		Swing	▼0.6	

=== Edgbaston ===
Edgbaston 2015
Party	Candidate	Votes	%	±%
Conservative	Matt Bennett	4,112	42.5	▲0.8
Labour	Tom Keeley	3,932	40.6	▼0.8
Green	Tom Dalton	777	8.0	▲1.3
Liberal Democrats	Lee Dargue	433	4.5	▼3.1
UKIP	Laura Howard	426	4.4	▲2.1
Majority		180	1.9	
Turnout		9,680		
Conservative hold		Swing	▲0.6	

=== Erdington ===
Erdington 2015
Party	Candidate	Votes	%	±%
Conservative	Gareth Moore	4,109	43.3	▼7.0
Labour	Keith Heron	3,420	36.0	▼0.1
UKIP	Justin Gayle	1,215	12.8	N/A
Green	Ulla Grant	325	3.4	▼0.6
Liberal Democrats	Philip Mills	247	2.6	▼2.2
NHA	Krystyna Mikula-Deegan	96	1.0	N/A
TUSC	Joe Foster	83	0.9	N/A
Majority		689	7.3	
Turnout		9,495		
Conservative hold		Swing	▼3.6	

=== Hall Green ===
Hall Green 2015
Party	Candidate	Votes	%	±%
Labour	Sam Burden	4,994	40.4	▼2.3
Conservative	David Agar	2,923	23.6	▼9.3
Liberal Democrats	Paula Smith	2,029	16.4	▼3.5
Independent	Bob Harvey	1,003	8.1	N/A
UKIP	Malcolm Mummery	980	7.9	N/A
Green	Rachel Xerri-Brooks	390	3.2	▼0.8
TUSC	David Geoffrey Wright	48	0.4	N/A
Majority		2,071	16.8	
Turnout		12,367		
Labour hold		Swing	▲3.5	

=== Handsworth Wood ===
Handsworth Wood 2015
Party	Candidate	Votes	%	±%
Labour	Paulette Hamilton	7,110	63.9	▲13.4
Conservative	Sukhwinder Sungu	2,393	21.5	▼19.4
UKIP	Harjinder Singh	597	5.4	N/A
Green	Eric Fairclough	457	4.1	▲0.4
Liberal Democrats	Arjun Singh	393	3.5	▼0.9
Socialist Labour	Shangara Bhatoe	179	1.6	N/A
Majority		4,717	42.4	
Turnout		11,129		
Labour hold		Swing	▲16.4	

=== Harborne ===
Harborne 2015
Party	Candidate	Votes	%	±%
Labour	James McKay	4,922	43.0	▼3.6
Conservative	Jane James	4,384	38.3	▼0.9
Green	Phil Simpson	964	8.4	▲0.3
UKIP	Charles Brecknell	654	5.7	N/A
Liberal Democrats	Philip Banting	528	4.6	▼0.8
Majority		538	4.7	
Turnout		11,452		
Labour hold		Swing	▼1.4	

=== Hodge Hill ===
Hodge Hill 2015
Party	Candidate	Votes	%	±%
Labour	Majid Mahmood	6,065	61.0	▲1.8
Conservative	Robert Coleman	1,635	16.5	▲7.6
UKIP	Adrian Duffen	1,527	15.3	▲10.0
Liberal Democrats	Waheed Rafiq	373	3.8	▼19.3
Green	Rhys Morgan	266	2.7	▲0.7
TUSC	Marie O'Connor	68	0.7	N/A
Majority		4,430	44.5	
Turnout		9,934		
Labour hold		Swing	▼2.9	

=== Kingstanding ===
Kingstanding 2015
Party	Candidate	Votes	%	±%
Labour	Des Hughes	3,547	42.5	▼2.9
Conservative	Andy Rudge	2,640	31.7	▼10.1
UKIP	Eric Westacott	1,761	21.1	N/A
Green	Joe Belcher	196	2.4	▼0.1
Liberal Democrats	Graham Lippiatt	136	1.6	▼1.0
TUSC	Ben Perry	57	0.7	N/A
Majority		907	10.8	
Turnout		8,337		
Labour hold		Swing	▲3.6	

=== Kings Norton ===
Kings Norton 2015
Party	Candidate	Votes	%	±%
Labour	Peter Griffiths	3,847	39.2	▼6.0
Conservative	Barbara Wood	3,727	38.0	▼1.7
UKIP	Tim Plumbe	1,539	15.7	N/A
Green	Claire Hammond	413	4.2	▲0.1
Liberal Democrats	Peter Lloyd	277	2.9	▼1.8
Majority		120	1.2	
Turnout		9,803		
Labour hold		Swing	▼2.2	

=== Ladywood ===
Ladywood 2015
Party	Candidate	Votes	%	±%
Labour	Albert Bore	4,764	52.0	▼7.7
Conservative	Tom Skidmore	2,290	25.0	▲3.7
Green	Chloe Juliette	999	10.9	▲0.1
UKIP	Matthew Ludford	576	6.3	N/A
Liberal Democrats	Mohammed Saeed	527	5.8	▼1.6
Majority		2,474	27.0	
Turnout		9,156		
Labour hold		Swing	▼5.7	

=== Longbridge ===
Longbridge 2015
Party	Candidate	Votes	%	±%
Labour	Andy Cartwright	4,148	38.7	▼7.8
Conservative	Daniel Caldicott	3,576	33.4	▼5.2
UKIP	Kevin Morris	2,147	20.1	N/A
Green	Aysha Turner	475	4.4	▲0.5
Liberal Democrats	Kevin Hannon	365	3.4	▼1.4
Majority		572	5.3	
Turnout		10,711		
Labour hold		Swing	▼1.3	

=== Lozells and East Handsworth ===
Lozells and East Handsworth 2015
Party	Candidate	Votes	%	±%
Labour	Waseem Zaffar	8,535	80.7	▲10.3
Conservative	Ravi Chumber	977	9.2	▲4.5
Liberal Democrats	Baljinder Kaur	379	3.6	▼15.7
Green	Ankaret Harmer	367	3.5	▼1.3
TUSC	Alistair Wingate	312	3.0	N/A
Majority		7,558	71.5	
Turnout		10,570		
Labour hold		Swing	▲2.9	

=== Moseley and Kings Heath ===
Moseley and Kings Heath 2015
Party	Candidate	Votes	%	±%
Labour	Martin Straker-Welds	5,603	45.2	▼3.7
Liberal Democrats	Martin Mullaney	2,134	17.2	▼9.8
Conservative	Owen Williams	1,813	14.6	▲3.1
Green	Elly Stanton	1,666	13.5	▲3.9
Independent	Luke Holland	546	4.4	N/A
UKIP	Rashpal Mondair	465	3.8	▲1.5
TUSC	Mike Friel	165	1.3	N/A
Majority		3,469	28.0	
Turnout		12,392		
Labour hold		Swing	▲3.1	

=== Nechells ===
Nechells 2015
Party	Candidate	Votes	%	±%
Labour	Yvonne Mosquito	6,403	74.1	▲14.5
Conservative	John Turner	964	11.2	▲2.0
Green	Janet Assheton	611	7.1	▲1.1
Liberal Democrats	Shazad Iqbal	574	6.6	▼17.7
Patriotic Socialist Party	John McAuliffe	88	1.0	N/A
Majority		4,439	62.9	
Turnout		8,640		
Labour hold		Swing	▲6.3	

=== Northfield ===
Northfield 2015
Party	Candidate	Votes	%	±%
Conservative	Debbie Clancy	4,705	39.7	▼2.3
Labour	Robbie Lea-Trengrouse	4,033	34.0	▼7.2
UKIP	Clair Braund	2,068	17.5	N/A
Green	Susan Pearce	517	4.4	▼0.9
Liberal Democrats	Andy Moles	436	3.7	▼1.3
TUSC	Clive Walder	78	0.7	N/A
Majority		672	5.7	
Turnout		11,837		
Conservative hold		Swing	▲2.5	

=== Oscott ===
Oscott 2015
Party	Candidate	Votes	%	±%
Labour	Keith Linnecor	4,268	42.3	▼15.7
Conservative	Graham Green	2,822	27.9	▼0.9
UKIP	Roger Tempest	2,382	23.6	N/A
Liberal Democrats	Nick Jolliffe	285	2.8	▼0.8
Green	Harry Eyles	253	2.5	▼0.4
TUSC	Brian Beddowes	91	0.9	N/A
Majority		1,446	14.4	
Turnout		10,101		
Labour hold		Swing	▼7.4	

=== Perry Barr ===
Perry Barr 2015
Party	Candidate	Votes	%	±%
Liberal Democrats	Jon Hunt	4,161	41.7	▼4.7
Labour	Sarfraiz Hussain	3,484	34.9	▼5.9
Conservative	Alain Hurst	1,055	10.6	▼1.4
UKIP	Charles Douglas	1,033	10.3	N/A
Green	Seth Atkin	246	2.5	N/A
Majority		677	6.8	
Turnout		9,979		
Liberal Democrats hold		Swing	▲0.6	

=== Quinton ===
Quinton 2015
Party	Candidate	Votes	%	±%
Labour	John Clancy	4,828	44.6	▼5.7
Conservative	Georgina Chandler	3,684	34.1	▼4.6
UKIP	Martin Barrett	1,423	13.1	N/A
Green	Peter Beck	491	4.5	▲0.8
Liberal Democrats	Ian Garrett	341	3.2	▼1.0
TUSC	Nick Hart	55	0.5	N/A
Majority		1,144	10.5	
Turnout		10,822		
Labour hold		Swing	▼0.6	

=== Selly Oak ===
Selly Oak 2015
Party	Candidate	Votes	%	±%
Labour Co-op	Brigid Jones	4,160	45.5	▲1.9
Conservative	Monica Hardie	2,225	22.7	▲4.8
Liberal Democrats	Colin Green	1,484	15.2	▼9.9
Green	Joe Rooney	1,189	12.2	▲3.1
UKIP	Sylvia Tempest-Jones	602	6.2	▲2.8
TUSC	Keturah Prendergast	122	1.2	N/A
Majority		1,935	19.8	
Turnout		9,782		
Labour Co-op hold		Swing	▼1.5	

=== Shard End ===
Shard End 2015
Party	Candidate	Votes	%	±%
Labour	Ian Ward	3,931	45.0	▼10.9
UKIP	Iain Roden	2,594	29.7	▲20.7
Conservative	Suzanne Webb	1,654	18.9	▼1.2
Liberal Democrats	Christopher Barber	327	3.7	▼0.1
Green	Christopher Nash	241	2.7	▼0.9
Majority		1,337	15.3	
Turnout		8,747		
Labour hold		Swing	▼15.8	

=== Sheldon ===
Sheldon 2015
Party	Candidate	Votes	%	±%
Liberal Democrats	Paul Tilsley	3,952	41.2	▼11.5
Labour	Bob Collins	2,247	23.4	▼2.3
UKIP	David Bridges	1,852	19.3	▲13.5
Conservative	Barry Theocharides	1,250	13.1	▲4.8
Green	Lewis Mughal	189	2.0	▲0.5
TUSC	Mark Andrews	97	1.0	N/A
Majority		1,705	17.8	
Turnout		9,587		
Liberal Democrats hold		Swing	▼4.6	

=== Soho ===
Soho 2015
Party	Candidate	Votes	%	±%
Labour	Sybil Spence	7,321	77.9	▲6.2
Conservative	Robert Higginson	1,091	11.6	▲4.6
Green	Margaret Okole	505	5.4	▲2.1
Liberal Democrats	Majid Hussain	483	5.1	▼12.3
Majority		6,230	66.3	
Turnout		9,400		
Labour hold		Swing	▲0.8	

=== South Yardley ===
South Yardley 2015
Party	Candidate	Votes	%	±%
Labour	Nawaz Ali	4,682	41.6	▼2.7
Liberal Democrats	Daphne Gaved	3,790	33.6	▼7.8
UKIP	Graham Duffen	1,488	13.2	▲7.1
Conservative	Pervez Akhtar	887	7.9	▲3.1
Green	Paul Holloway	322	2.8	▼0.1
TUSC	Siobhan Friel	98	0.9	N/A
Majority		892	8.0	
Turnout		11,267		
Labour hold		Swing	▲2.6	

=== Sparkbrook ===
Sparkbrook 2015
Party	Candidate	Votes	%	±%
Labour	Tony Kennedy	8,599	77.5	▲28.0
Liberal Democrats	Seleen Hussein	1,285	11.6	▲5.2
Conservative	Andrew May	654	5.9	▲3.1
Green	James Mckears	553	5.0	▲2.8
Majority		7,314	65.9	▲55.0
Turnout		11,091		
Labour hold		Swing	▲11.4	

=== Springfield ===
Springfield 2015
Party	Candidate	Votes	%	±%
Labour	Habib Rehman	7,060	61.2	▲7.2
Liberal Democrats	Tanveer Chouxhry	2,836	24.6	▲1.7
Conservative	Tom Huxley	1,129	9.8	▲4.0
Green	Seeyam Brijmohun	515	4.5	▲1.7
Majority		4,224	36.6	▲5.5
Turnout		11,540		
Labour hold		Swing	▲2.8	

=== Stechford and Yardley North ===
Stechford and Yardley North 2015
Party	Candidate	Votes	%	±%
Labour	Basharat Dad	3,567	35.6	Steady
Liberal Democrats	Colin Jones	3,354	33.5	▼8.8
UKIP	Paul Clayton	1,766	17.6	▲8.3
Conservative	Robert Clark	982	9.8	▲0.1
Green	Grant Bishop	269	2.7	▲0.4
TUSC	Laura Cross	87	0.9	N/A
Majority		213	2.1	▼4.5
Turnout		10,025		
Labour gain from Liberal Democrats		Swing	▲4.4	

=== Stockland Green ===
Stockland Green 2015
Party	Candidate	Votes	%	±%
Labour	Mick Finnegan	4,649	54.3	▼0.9
Conservative	Rachel Toussaint	2,053	24.0	▼5.7
UKIP	Mike Kemble	1,061	12.4	N/A
Liberal Democrats	Franklyn Aaron	414	4.8	▼1.8
Green	Sara Myers	389	4.5	▲0.7
Majority		2,596	30.3	▲4.9
Turnout		8,566		
Labour hold		Swing	▲2.4	

=== Sutton Four Oaks ===
Sutton Four Oaks 2015
Party	Candidate	Votes	%	±%
Conservative	Maureen Cornish	8,393	62.0	▼7.9
Labour	Nick Preston	1,926	14.2	▲0.5
UKIP	Brendan Padmore	1,827	13.5	N/A
Liberal Democrats	Hubert Duffy	803	5.9	▼2.2
Green	David Ratcliff	596	4.4	▼3.2
Majority		6,467	47.7	▼8.5
Turnout		13,545		
Conservative hold		Swing	▼4.2	

=== Sutton New Hall ===
Due to a by-election the top two candidates were elected.

Sutton New Hall 2015 (2)
Party	Candidate	Votes	%	±%
Conservative	David Barrie	6,889		
Conservative	Alex Yip	4,832		
UKIP	Stuart Connolly	2,750		
Labour	Ian Brindley	2,373		
Labour	Frank Ray	1,819		
Green	Colin Marriott	891		
Liberal Democrats	Gareth Hardy	636		
Liberal Democrats	Trevor Holtom	585		
Majority				
Turnout				
Conservative hold		Swing		
Conservative hold		Swing		

=== Sutton Trinity ===
Sutton Trinity 2015
Party	Candidate	Votes	%	±%
Conservative	David Pears	5,990	47.3	▼10.6
Labour	Roger Barley	2,699	21.3	▼4.7
UKIP	Marcus Brown	2,577	20.4	N/A
Liberal Democrats	Sally Lippiatt	830	6.6	▼2.5
Green	Richard Winter	565	4.5	▼1.8
Majority		3,291	26.0	▼8.0
Turnout		12,661		
Conservative hold		Swing	▼3.0	

=== Sutton Vesey ===
Sutton Vesey 2015
Party	Candidate	Votes	%	±%
Conservative	Lyn Collin	5,942	46.2	▼2.8
Labour	Manish Puri	4,268	33.2	▼6.3
UKIP	Albert Meehan	1,627	12.6	N/A
Liberal Democrats	Lynn Williams	569	4.4	▼1.1
Green	Max Ramsay	464	3.6	N/A
Majority		1,674	13.0	▲3.5
Turnout		12,870		
Conservative hold		Swing	▲1.8	

=== Tyburn ===
Tyburn 2015
Party	Candidate	Votes	%	±%
Labour	Mike Sharpe	3,720	43.6	▼9.2
Conservative	Cilfton Welch	2,088	24.5	▲2.7
UKIP	Andrew Garcarz	1,894	22.2	N/A
Liberal Democrats	Ann Holtom	550	6.5	▼13.8
Green	Alex Wright	206	2.4	▼1.8
TUSC	James Redfren	69	0.8	N/A
Majority		1,632	19.1	▼11.9
Turnout		8,527		
Labour hold		Swing	▼6.0	

=== Washwood Heath ===
Washwood Heath 2015
Party	Candidate	Votes	%	±%
Labour	Ansar Khan	9,200	78.4	▼10.0
Liberal Democrats	Shamsur Rehman	1,395	11.9	▲7.4
Conservative	Cameron Hughes	615	5.2	▲2.4
Green	John Bentley	525	4.5	▲2.3
Majority		7,805	66.5	▼17.9
Turnout		11,735		
Labour hold		Swing	▼8.7	

=== Weoley ===
Weoley 2015
Party	Candidate	Votes	%	±%
Labour	Steve Booton	4,118	40.4	▼1.1
Conservative	Jayne Freeman	3,519	34.6	▼7.1
UKIP	Tony Hayes	1,641	16.1	N/A
Green	Anna Masters	494	4.7	▼0.3
Liberal Democrats	Steven Haynes	412	4.0	▼2.4
Majority		599	5.8	N/A
Turnout		10,184		
Labour gain from Conservative		Swing	▲3.0	
