= 2007 Birmingham City Council election =

2007 UK local government election

← 2006	3 May 2007	2008 →

One third (40) seats to Birmingham City Council 61 seats needed for a majority
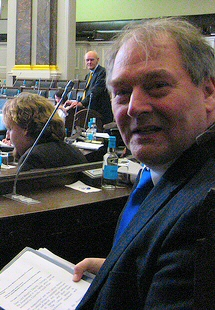

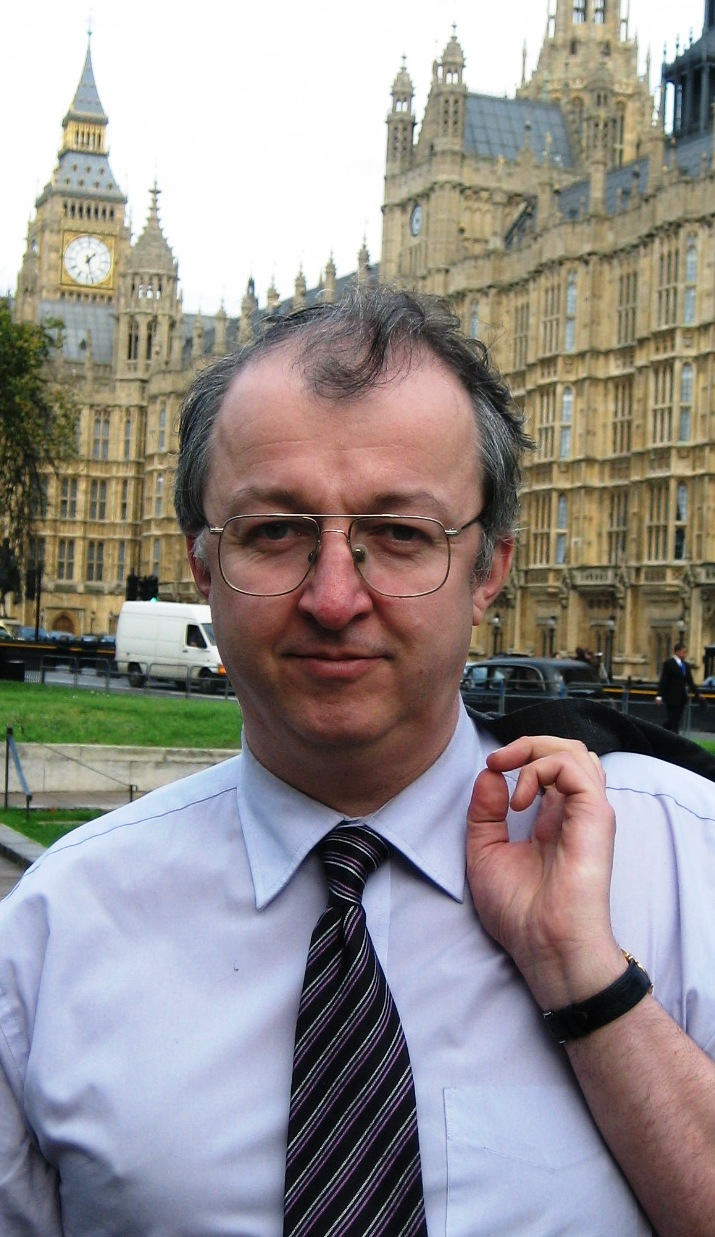
	First party	Second party	Third party
Leader	Mike Whitby	Albert Bore	John Hemming
Party	Conservative	Labour	Liberal Democrats
Leader's seat	Harborne	Ladywood	South Yardley
Seats won	44	41	32
Seat change	▲3	▼3	Steady
- Map of the 2007 Birmingham City Council election results. Labour in red, Conservatives in blue, Liberal Democrats in yellow and Respect in green.
Council control before election
No Overall Control
Council control after election
No Overall Control

Elections to Birmingham City Council in England were held in May 2007. One third of the council was up for election and the council stayed under no overall control as it had been since 2003.

== Election result ==
Birmingham local election result 2007
Party	Seats	Gains	Losses	Net gain/loss	Seats %	Votes %	Votes	+/−
Conservative	44	▲3	Steady	▲3				
Labour	41	▲1	▼4	▼3				
Liberal Democrats	32	▲1	▼1	Steady				
Respect	2	▲1	▼1	Steady				
BNP	0	Steady	Steady	Steady	0.0			
Green	0	Steady	Steady	Steady	0.0			
UKIP	0	Steady	Steady	Steady	0.0			
Community Independent	0	Steady	Steady	Steady	0.0			
Independent	0	Steady	Steady	Steady	0.0			
Socialist Labour	0	Steady	Steady	Steady	0.0			
National Front	0	Steady	Steady	Steady	0.0			
New Nationalist Party	0	Steady	Steady	Steady	0.0			
People's Justice	0	Steady	Steady	Steady	0.0			

== Ward results ==
=== Acocks Green ===
Acocks Green 2007
Party	Candidate	Votes	%	±%
Liberal Democrats	Penny Wagg	3,072		
Labour	John O'Shea	1,452		
BNP	Ben Lumby	536		
Conservative	Hannah Axford	508		
Green	Amanda Baker	258		
UKIP	Peter Hillman	77		
Majority		1,620		
Turnout		5,919	30.3	
Liberal Democrats hold		Swing		

=== Aston ===
Aston 2007
Party	Candidate	Votes	%	±%
Labour	Muhammad Afzal	2,684		
Respect	Abdul Aziz	2,018		
Liberal Democrats	Saeed Aehmed	2005		
Conservative	Mohammed Hasan	209		
Green	Liam Wilkinson	165		
BNP	Pamela Allen	136		
Majority		666		
Turnout		7,255	39.9	
Labour gain from Respect		Swing		

=== Bartley Green ===
Bartley Green 2007
Party	Candidate	Votes	%	±%
Conservative	John Lines	3,718		
Labour	John Ritchie	1,421		
BNP	Julie Ashton	569	8.2	
Liberal Democrats	John Ashley Hemming	307		
Green	Annabel Smith	186		
Majority		2,297		
Turnout		6,215	35.1	
Conservative hold		Swing		

=== Billesley ===
Billesley 2007
Party	Candidate	Votes	%	±%
Conservative	John Hughes	2,608		
Labour	Susan Burfoot	2,445		
BNP	Malcolm Owen	753		
Liberal Democrats	Philip Wagg	463		
Green	Margaret James	291		
Majority		163		
Turnout		6,589	35.0	
Conservative gain from Labour		Swing		

=== Bordesley Green ===
Bordesley Green 2007
Party	Candidate	Votes	%	±%
Labour	Shafique Shah	3,908		
Liberal Democrats	Saeed Mohammed	2,638		
Respect	Farooq Rajput	1,403		
Conservative	Fitzroy Stevenson	352		
BNP	Martin Williams	279		
Green	Adam Clawley	196		
Majority		1,270		
Turnout		8,805	44.3	
Labour hold		Swing		

=== Bournville ===
Bournville 2007
Party	Candidate	Votes	%	±%
Conservative	Tim Huxtable	3,890		
Labour	Peter Griffiths	1,715		
Green	Joe Rooney	1,096		
Liberal Democrats	Roger Harmer	792		
BNP	Malcolm Doughty	444	5.1	
Majority		2,175	31.9	
Turnout		7,953	40.9	
Conservative hold		Swing		

=== Brandwood ===
Brandwood 2007
Party	Candidate	Votes	%	±%
Conservative	Mark Hill	2,646		
Labour	Gary Mills	2,231		
Liberal Democrats	Brian Peace	730		
BNP	Gemma Orton	588		
Green	Anna Masters	448		
Majority		415		
Turnout		6,654	37.2	
Conservative hold		Swing		

=== Edgbaston ===
Edgbaston 2007
Party	Candidate	Votes	%	±%
Conservative	James Hutchings	2,410		
Labour	Martin Clee	1,196		
Liberal Democrats	Stuart Ritchie	524		
Green	Barney Smith	322		
BNP	Trevor Shearer	121		
UKIP	Francois Jones	75		
Majority		1,214		
Turnout		4,663	28.0	
Conservative hold		Swing		

=== Erdington ===
Erdington 2007
Party	Candidate	Votes	%	±%
Conservative	Gareth Compton	2,588		
Labour Co-op	Susanna McCorry	1,701		
BNP	Terence Larkin	494		
Liberal Democrats	Gareth Hardy	453		
Green	Mark Oley	295		
Majority		887		
Turnout		5,540	33.4	
Conservative gain from Labour		Swing		

=== Hall Green ===
Hall Green 2007
Party	Candidate	Votes	%	±%
Liberal Democrats	Jacqueline Hawthorn	3,122		
Conservative	Bob Harvey	2,430		
Labour	Samuel Burden	1,346		
BNP	Robert Davenport	412		
Green	Daniel Cook	297	2.3	
Majority		692		
Turnout		7,622	40.6	
Liberal Democrats hold		Swing		

=== Handsworth Wood ===
Handsworth Wood 2007
Party	Candidate	Votes	%	±%
Labour	Paulette Hamilton	2,684		
Conservative	Arjan Singh	2,224		
Socialist Labour	John Tyrrell	1,052		
Liberal Democrats	Kingsley Douglas	517		
Green	Eric Fairclough	309		
BNP	Keith Davies	202		
Majority		460		
Turnout		7,004	36.3	
Labour hold		Swing		

=== Harborne ===
Harborne 2007
Party	Candidate	Votes	%	±%
Conservative	Peter Hollingworth	2,699		
Labour	John Priest	1,662		
Green	Phil Simpson	786		
Liberal Democrats	Miriam Banting	649		
BNP	Lynette Orton	265	3.5	
Majority		1,307		
Turnout		6,083	37.0	
Conservative hold		Swing		

=== Hodge Hill ===
Hodge Hill 2007
Party	Candidate	Votes	%	±%
Liberal Democrats	Gwyn Neilly	2,191	40.7	
Labour	Mike Nangle	2,075		
BNP	Denis Adams	686		
Conservative	Jessie Holland	671		
Independent	Roger Gordon	509		
Green	Lydia Bradshaw	108		
Majority		116		
Turnout		6,433	37.1	
Liberal Democrats gain from Labour		Swing		

=== Kings Norton ===
Kings Norton 2007
Party	Candidate	Votes	%	±%
Conservative	Barbara Wood	2,340		
Labour	Laura Ross	1,930		
BNP	Michael Bell	534		
Liberal Democrats	Kevin Hannon	393		
Green	Hermoine Coalter	231		
Majority		410		
Turnout		5,510	32.8	
Conservative gain from Labour		Swing		

=== Kingstanding ===
Kingstanding 2007
Party	Candidate	Votes	%	±%
Labour	Peter Kane	2,025		
Conservative	Mark Haddon	1,020		
BNP	Lee Windridge	673		
Liberal Democrats	Hubert Duffy	330		
New Nationalist Party	Sharon Ebanks	171		
National Front	Terry Williams	161		
Green	Geoffrey Tapalu	122		
Majority		1,005		
Turnout		4,533	26.3	
Labour hold		Swing		

=== Ladywood ===
Ladywood 2007
Party	Candidate	Votes	%	±%
Labour	Albert Bore	1,791		
Conservative	Peter Smallbone	732		
Liberal Democrats	Kenneth Jeffers	456		
Green	Damien Duff	276		
BNP	Lee Saunders	160		
UKIP	Mark Nattrass	47		
Majority		1,059		
Turnout		3,474	21.0	
Labour hold		Swing		

=== Longbridge ===
Longbridge 2007
Party	Candidate	Votes	%	±%
Conservative	Keith Barton	2,050		
Labour	Amy Watson	1,629		
BNP	Elizabeth Wainwright	989		
Liberal Democrats	Sven Harvey	443		
Green	Bill Van Marle	222		
Majority		421		
Turnout		5,344	29.2	
Conservative hold		Swing		

=== Lozells and East Handsworth ===
Lozells and East Handsworth 2007
Party	Candidate	Votes	%	±%
Labour	Mahmood Hussain	3,454		
Liberal Democrats	Sabirul Islam	1,634		
Respect	Raghib Ahsan	1,411		
Conservative	Zaweed Khan	334		
Green	Richard Pitt	224		
BNP	Zane Patchell	92		
Majority		1,820		
Turnout		7,177	38.2	
Labour hold		Swing		

=== Moseley and Kings Heath ===
Moseley and Kings Heath 2007
Party	Candidate	Votes	%	±%
Liberal Democrats	Emily Cox	2,728		
Labour	William Lees	2,143		
Respect	Yasir Idris	947		
Conservative	Tariq Hussain	911		
Green	Elinor Stanton	683		
BNP	Sabrina Garnowski	161		
UKIP	Alan Blumenthal	134		
Majority		585		
Turnout		7,730	41.2	
Liberal Democrats hold		Swing		

=== Nechells ===
Nechells 2007
Party	Candidate	Votes	%	±%
Labour	Yvonne Mosquito	1,878		
Respect	Mushtaq Hussain	1,013		
Liberal Democrats	Mohammed Masoom	874		
BNP	Darren Potter	297		
Community Independent Party	Mohammed Shahban	268		
Green	Janet Assheton	256		
People's Justice	A Raja	167		
Majority		865		
Turnout		4,787	26.5	
Labour hold		Swing		

=== Northfield ===
Northfield 2007
Party	Candidate	Votes	%	±%
Conservative	Reg Corns	2,931		
Labour Co-op	Brian Seymore-Smith	1,839		
BNP	Leslie Orton	1,228		
Liberal Democrats	Andrew Moles	575		
Green	Susan Pearce	255		
Majority		1,092		
Turnout		6,935	36.6	
Conservative hold		Swing		

=== Oscott ===
Oscott 2007
Party	Candidate	Votes	%	±%
Labour	Keith Linnecor	2,819		
Conservative	Graham Green	2,144		
BNP	Robert Purcell	894		
Liberal Democrats	James Hamilton	357		
Green	Harry Eyles	169		
New Nationalist Party	Keith Axon	102		
Majority		675		
Turnout		6,494	35.6	
Labour hold		Swing		

=== Perry Barr ===
Perry Barr 2007
Party	Candidate	Votes	%	±%
Liberal Democrats	Jon Hunt	2,794		
Labour	Sam Allen	1,675		
Conservative	Maria Green	734		
BNP	Steven Thomas	549		
Green	Lester Mundy	183		
Majority		1,119		
Turnout		5,950	34.8	
Liberal Democrats hold		Swing		

=== Quinton ===
Quinton 2007
Party	Candidate	Votes	%	±%
Conservative	Len Clark	3,215		
Labour	Caroline Badley	2,835		
BNP	Josephine Larkin	481		
Liberal Democrats	Susan Sherwen	457		
Green	Peter Beck	336		
Majority		380		
Turnout		7,335	42.1	
Conservative hold		Swing		

=== Selly Oak ===
Selly Oak 2007
Party	Candidate	Votes	%	±%
Liberal Democrats	Ian Wright	2,081		
Labour	David Williams	1,620		
Conservative	Andrew Hardie	956		
Green	Peter Tinsley	546		
BNP	Jeffrey Cahill	230		
Majority		461		
Turnout		5,443	26.6	
Liberal Democrats hold		Swing		

=== Shard End ===
Shard End 2007
Party	Candidate	Votes	%	±%
Labour	Ian Ward	2,527		
BNP	Richard Lumby	1,263		
Conservative	Barry Hands	806		
Liberal Democrats	Bryan Brooke	454		
Green	John Read	112		
National Front	Mark Neary	92		
New Nationalist Party	Matthew Benton	30		
Majority		1,264		
Turnout		5,373	29.4	
Labour hold		Swing		

=== Sheldon ===
Sheldon 2007
Party	Candidate	Votes	%	±%
Liberal Democrats	Paul Tilsley	3,637		
Labour	Mick Johnson	729		
BNP	Michael Jones	724		
Conservative	Emma Mahay	489		
Green	Michael Sheridan	132		
Majority		2,908		
Turnout		5,718	36.1	
Liberal Democrats hold		Swing		

=== Soho ===
Soho 2007
Party	Candidate	Votes	%	±%
Labour	Sybil Spence	3,325		
Liberal Democrats	Zalal Choudhury	1,482		
Conservative	David Williams-Masinda	438		
Socialist Labour	Sheera Johal	260		
Green	Huw Davies	234		
BNP	Darren Allen	120		
Majority		1,843		
Turnout		5,894	34.1	
Labour hold		Swing		

=== South Yardley ===
South Yardley 2007
Party	Candidate	Votes	%	±%
Liberal Democrats	David Osborne	3,342		
Labour	Javed Iqbal	1,622		
BNP	Tanya Whitehead	686		
Conservative	Ken Axford	560		
Green	Rianne Ten Veen	221		
National Front	Adrian Davidson	134		
Majority		1,720		
Turnout		6,482	33.7	
Liberal Democrats hold		Swing		

=== Sparkbrook ===
Sparkbrook 2007
Party	Candidate	Votes	%	±%
Respect	Mohammed Ishtiaq	3,514		
Labour	Mohammed Azim	2,503		
Liberal Democrats	Dilawar Khan	919		
Conservative	Anwar Hussain	548		
Community Independent	Shokat Ali	503		
Green	Charles Alldrick	310		
BNP	Arthur Botterill	106		
Majority		1,011		
Turnout		8,456	43.5	
Respect gain from Liberal Democrats		Swing		

=== Springfield ===
Springfield 2007
Party	Candidate	Votes	%	±%
Liberal Democrats	Tanveer Choudhry	2,602		
Labour	Fazal Ellahi	2,283		
Respect	Mohammed Suleman	2,092		
Conservative	Mahinderpal Singh	561		
Green	Ian Jamieson	300		
BNP	Deanne Adams	254		
Majority		319		
Turnout		8,124	41.8	
Liberal Democrats hold		Swing		

=== Stechford and Yardley North ===
Stechford and Yardley North 2007
Party	Candidate	Votes	%	±%
Liberal Democrats	Barbara Jackson	3,612		
Labour	Suraiya Makhdoom	784		
BNP	Patrick Collins	707		
Conservative	Robert Clark	506		
Green	Edith Roberts	119		
UKIP	Alan Ware	77		
Majority		2,837		
Turnout		5,881	32.4	
Liberal Democrats hold		Swing		

=== Stockland Green ===
Stockland Green 2007
Party	Candidate	Votes	%	±%
Labour	Mick Finnegan	2,300		
Conservative	Jackie Banks	1,376		
Liberal Democrats	Richard Pearson	556		
BNP	Peter Lawrie	479		
Green	John Bentley	258		
Majority		924		
Turnout		4,976	29.5	
Labour hold		Swing		

=== Sutton Four Oaks ===
Sutton Four Oaks 2007
Party	Candidate	Votes	%	±%
Conservative	Maureen Cornish	4,697		
Liberal Democrats	Trevor Holtom	647		
Labour	Manish Puri	555		
UKIP	Brendan Padmore	489		
BNP	Maureen Davies	372		
Green	Karl Macnaughton	301		
Majority		4,050		
Turnout		7,070	37.4	
Conservative hold		Swing		

=== Sutton New Hall ===
Sutton New Hall 2007
Party	Candidate	Votes	%	±%
Conservative	John Breadman	3,694		
Labour	Christopher Hillcox	922		
Liberal Democrats	Jean Woods	660		
BNP	Karen Lawrie	618		
Green	Jim Orford	296		
Majority		2,772		
Turnout		6,202	35.1	
Conservative hold		Swing		

=== Sutton Trinity ===
Sutton Trinity 2007
Party	Candidate	Votes	%	±%
Conservative	David Pears	3,622		
Labour	Roger Barley	1,063		
Liberal Democrats	Maureen Parker	730		
BNP	Mark Trippas	493		
Green	Ulla Grant	351		
Majority		2,559		
Turnout		6,271	32.4	
Conservative hold		Swing		

=== Sutton Vesey ===
Sutton Vesey 2007
Party	Candidate	Votes	%	±%
Conservative	Stuart Clarkson	3,477		
Labour	Robert Pocock	1,678		
Liberal Democrats	Sidney Woods	696		
BNP	Wendy Lawrie	560		
Green	Heather Ramsden	397		
Majority		1,799		
Turnout		6,821	37.1	
Conservative hold		Swing		

=== Tyburn ===
Tyburn 2007
Party	Candidate	Votes	%	±%
Labour	Mike Sharpe	1,584		
Liberal Democrats	John Line	1,112		
Conservative	Sallyann Rose	1,020		
BNP	Alan Chamberlain	550		
Green	Tamara Bolger	133		
New Nationalist Party	John Mitchell	54		
Majority		472		
Turnout		4,464	26.1	
Labour hold		Swing		

=== Washwood Heath ===
Washwood Heath 2007
Party	Candidate	Votes	%	±%
Labour	Tariq Khan	5,294		
Liberal Democrats	Nazabit Ali	3,074		
Conservative	Wilfred Holland	481		
BNP	Graham Jones	254		
Green	Hazel Clawley	248		
Majority		2,220		
Turnout		9,389	48.4	
Labour hold		Swing		

=== Weoley ===
Weoley 2007
Party	Candidate	Votes	%	±%
Conservative	Adrian Delaney	2,187		
Labour Co-op	Mike Drinkwater	1,860		
BNP	Norman Ashton	548		
Liberal Democrats	Trevor Sword	534		
Independent	Mark Jastrzebski	264		
Green	Stuart Masters	237		
Common Good	Dick Rodgers	198		
UKIP	David Collin	83		
Majority		327		
Turnout		5,918	32.8	
Conservative hold		Swing		
