= Sutton Coldfield News =

The Sutton Coldfield News was a newspaper serving the area of Sutton Coldfield in Birmingham, West Midlands, England covering the wards of Sutton Four Oaks, Sutton Trinity, Sutton Vesey, Sutton New Hall, Erdington and Streetly. It was owned by the Trinity Mirror group.

The newspaper was established in 1869 and closed in November 2011. The final issue was produced in the week commencing 14 November 2011; at the time of its closure Sutton Coldfield News was a weekly free newspaper owned by Trinity Mirror as part of Trinity Group Midlands. For some time it kept an editorial and sales office on Birmingham Road, a main thoroughfare just off the main shopping precinct of Sutton Coldfield.

Sutton Coldfield News sometimes printed under the title of Sutton Coldfield and Erdington News in its early history.
