= People's Justice Party =

People's Justice Party refers to:

- People's Justice Party (Malaysia)
- People's Justice Party (UK)
- People's Justice Party (Germany)
