= Harborne (ward) =

Coordinates: 52.45°N 1.97°W

- Ward
- Harborne Ward shown within Birmingham

- Location within the West Midlands
- Population: 23,001 (2011)
- OS grid reference: SP020836
- Metropolitan borough: Birmingham
- Metropolitan county: West Midlands
- Region: West Midlands
- Country: England
- Sovereign state: United Kingdom
- Post town: BIRMINGHAM
- Postcode district: B17
- Dialling code: 0121
- Police: West Midlands
- Fire: West Midlands
- Ambulance: West Midlands
- UK Parliament: Birmingham Edgbaston
- Councillors: Martin Brooks (Labour Party); Jayne Francis (Labour Party)

Harborne ward is a local government district, one of 40 wards that make up Birmingham City Council. Harborne lies to the south west of Birmingham city centre. It has a slightly older age profile than the city average. The percentage of ethnic minority residents is below the city average. Unemployment is below the city average. The ward population at the 2011 census was 23,001.

== Politics ==
The Harborne ward is currently represented by Martin Brooks, an independent, and Kevin Carmody of the Green Party.

The ward of Harborne forms part of the Parliamentary constituency of Birmingham Edgbaston along with Bartley Green, Edgbaston (ward), and Quinton, which has been represented by Labour and Co-operative MP Preet Gill since 2017.

== Election results ==
=== 2020s ===
==== Harborne ====
2026 Birmingham City Council election, Harborne
Party	Candidate	Votes	%	±%
Independent	Martin John Brooks	1,723	25.2	New
Green	Kevin James Carmody	1,463	21.4	▲10.0
Conservative	Hugo George Rasenberg	1,411	20.7	▼14.3
Labour	Richard William Moore	1,344	19.7	▼33.6
Green	Ben Goodwin	1,289	18.9	New
Labour	Hasnain Qamar Rashid Bhatti Khan	1,228	18.0	▼33.3
Conservative	Amaar Shahzada	1,012	14.8	▼16.2
Reform	Aniraj Sharma	987	14.5	New
Reform	Jyotsna Singh	902	13.2	New
Independent	James Peter Cross	846	12.4	New
Liberal Democrats	Sarah Marwick	407	6.0	▼3.7
Liberal Democrats	Christopher John Bertram	396	5.8	▼2.5
Independent	James Victor Burgess	347	5.1	New
Majority		52	0.8	
Turnout			43.42	
Independent hold		Swing		
Green gain from Labour		Swing		

2022 Birmingham City Council election, Harborne
Party	Candidate	Votes	%	±%
Labour	Martin Brooks	2,923	53.3	▲19.4
Labour	Jayne Francis	2,815	51.3	▲8.4
Conservative	Peter Fowler	1,919	35.0	▼6.5
Conservative	Harriet O'Hara	1,703	31.0	▼8.1
Green	Alistair Crisp	628	11.4	▲0.8
Liberal Democrats	Joseph Harmer	532	9.7	▼1.1
Liberal Democrats	Ian Garrett	455	8.3	▼2.3
Majority				
Turnout		11,007	36.24	
Rejected ballots		32		
Labour gain from Conservative		Swing		
Labour hold		Swing		

=== 2010s ===
2018 Birmingham City Council election, Harborne
Party	Candidate	Votes	%	±%
Labour	Jayne Francis	2,623	22.69	
Conservative	Peter Fowler	2,533	21.91	
Conservative	Akaal Sidhu	2390	20.67	
Labour	Sundip Meghani	2061	17.82	
Liberal Democrats	Colin Green	657	5.68	
Green	Phil Simpson	650	5.62	
Liberal Democrats	Ian Garrett	646	5.59	
Majority				
Turnout		6,109	38.60	▼0.63
Labour hold		Swing		
Conservative gain from Labour		Swing		

2016 Birmingham City Council election, Harborne
Party	Candidate	Votes	%	±%
Labour	Jayne Francis	2,841	44.7	▲1.7
Conservative	Akaal Sidhu	2,404	37.8	▼0.5
Green	Phil Simpson	494	7.8	▼0.6
UKIP	Mary Morris	376	5.9	▲0.2
Liberal Democrats	Philip Banting	240	3.8	▼0.8
Majority		437	6.9	▲2.2
Turnout		6,355	39.23	
Labour hold		Swing		

2015 Birmingham City Council election Harborne
Party	Candidate	Votes	%	±%
Labour	James McKay	4,922	43.0	▼3.6
Conservative	Jane James	4,384	38.3	▼0.9
Green	Phil Simpson	964	8.4	▲0.3
UKIP	Charles Brecknell	654	5.7	
Liberal Democrats	Philip Banting	528	4.6	▼0.8
Majority		538	4.7	
Turnout		11,452		
Labour hold		Swing	▼1.4	

2014 Birmingham City Council election Harborne
Party	Candidate	Votes	%	±%
Conservative	John Alden	2,816		
Labour	Nabila Zulfiqar	2,518		
Green	Phil Simpson	637		
UKIP	Charles Brecknell	574		
Liberal Democrats	Philip Banting	258		
Majority		298		
Turnout				
Conservative hold		Swing		

2012 Birmingham City Council election Harborne
Party	Candidate	Votes	%	±%
Labour	Elaine Williams	3,264	50.2	▲3.6
Conservative	John Alden	2,441	37.5	▼1.65
Green	Phil Simpson	394	6.1	▼1.97
UKIP	Keith Rowe	233	3.6	NEW
Liberal Democrats	Alaine Christian	178	2.6	▼2.8
Majority		823	17.7	▲10.2
Turnout		6,529	37.95	▼8.09
Labour gain from Conservative		Swing		

2011 Birmingham Council election Harborne
Party	Candidate	Votes	%	±%
Labour	James McKay	3,655	46.6	▲12.5
Conservative	Geoff Hewitt	3,071	39.15	▼2.85
Green	Phil Simpson	633	8.07	▲1.37
Liberal Democrats	Christopher Bates	426	5.4	▼9.2
Majority		584	7.5	▼0.4
Turnout		7,844	46.04	▼20.26
Labour gain from Conservative		Swing		

2010 Birmingham Council election Harborne
Party	Candidate	Votes	%	±%
Conservative	Mike Whitby	4,640	42.0	▼7.5
Labour	James McKay	3,766	34.1	▲8.8
Liberal Democrats	Mohammed Sagier	1,609	14.6	▲7.2
Green	Phil Simpson	744	6.7	▼5.9
BNP	Roy Bevington	289	2.6	▼0.9
Majority		874	7.9	▼16.3
Turnout		11,078	66.3	▲32.9
Conservative hold		Swing		

=== 2000s ===
2008 Birmingham City Council election Harborne
Party	Candidate	Votes	%	±%
Conservative	John Alden	2,717	49.5	▲5.0
Labour	John Priest	1,389	25.3	▼2.1
Green	Phil Simpson	691	12.6	▼0.4
Liberal Democrats	Mohammed Sagier	405	7.4	▼3.3
BNP	Howard Hamilton	193	3.5	▼0.9
UKIP	Edward Siddall-Jones	80	1.5	NEW
Majority		1,328	24.2	▲7.1
Turnout		5,475	33.4	▼3.58
Conservative hold		Swing		

2007 Birmingham City Council election Harborne
Party	Candidate	Votes	%	±%
Conservative	Peter Hollingworth	2,699	44.5	▼3.8
Labour	John Priest	1,662	27.4	▼0.1
Green	Philip Simpson	786	13.0	▲3.0
Liberal Democrats	Miriam Banting	649	10.7	▲2.0
BNP	Lynette Orton	265	4.4	▼1.1
Majority		1,937	17.1	▼3.7
Turnout		6,083	36.98	▼3.52
Conservative hold		Swing		

2006 Birmingham City Council election Harborne
Party	Candidate	Votes	%	±%
Conservative	Mike Whitby	3,200	48.3	
Labour	John Priest	1,823	27.5	
Green	Philip Simpson	665	10.0	
Liberal Democrats	Mohammed Sagier	577	8.7	
BNP	Josephine Larkin	364	5.5	
Majority		1,377	20.8	
Turnout		6,609	40.5	▼0.83
Conservative hold		Swing		

2004 Birmingham City Council election Harborne
Party	Candidate	Votes	%	±%
Conservative	John Alden	3,268	16.93	
Conservative	Peter Hollingworth	3,170	16.42	
Conservative	Mike Whitby	3,100	16.06	
Labour	Badley, C.	1,879	9.73	
Labour	McCarthy, K.	1,589	8.23	
Labour	Hepburn, M.	1,514	7.84	
Liberal Democrats	Banting, M.	1,189	6.16	
Liberal Democrats	Sagier, M.	1,155	5.98	
Liberal Democrats	Selwood, B.	1,035	5.36	
Green	Carins, D.	990	5.13	
BNP	Bellinger, S.	378	1.96	
Majority				
Turnout		19,301	41.33	▲7.93
Conservative hold		Swing		
Conservative hold		Swing		
Conservative hold		Swing		

2002 Birmingham City Council election Harborne
Party	Candidate	Votes	%	±%
Conservative	Peter Hollingworth	3,008	52.4	▼2.4
Labour	Badley, C.	1,816	31.7	▼0.5
Liberal Democrats	Banting, M.	652	11.4	▲2.1
Green	Vaze, P.	261	4.5	▲0.8
Majority		1,192	20.4	▼2.2
Turnout		5,737	33.4	▲1.6
Conservative hold		Swing	▼1.7	

2000 Birmingham City Council election Harborne
Party	Candidate	Votes	%	±%
Conservative	Alden, J.	3,029	54.8	▼2.3
Labour	Sampson, R.	1,782	32.2	▼0.7
Liberal Democrats	Dow, C.	512	9.3	▼0.7
Green	Vaze, P.	203	3.7	NEW
Majority		1,247	22.6	▼1.6
Turnout		5,589	31.8	▲1.7
Conservative hold		Swing		

=== 1990 ===
1998 Birmingham City Council election Harborne
Party	Candidate	Votes	%	±%
Conservative	Hollingworth, P.	2,995	57.1	▲3.7
Labour	Smith-O'Gorman, W.	1,724	32.9	▼3.6
Liberal Democrats	Boyle, C.	527	10	▲1.8
Majority		1,271	24.2	▲7.3
Turnout		5,246	30.1	▲1.1
Conservative hold		Swing		

Harborne By-Election 11 September 1997
Party	Candidate	Votes	%	±%
Conservative	Mike Whitby	2,719	53.4	▲8.5
Labour	Stephen Cormell	1,859	36.5	▼6.8
Liberal Democrats	Conall Boyle	420	8.2	▼1.3
Green	Peter Beck	96	1.9	▼0.4
Majority		860	16.9	▲15.3
Turnout		5,094	29.0	▲1.1
Conservative gain from Labour		Swing		

1996 Birmingham City Council election Harborne
Party	Candidate	Votes	%	±%
Conservative	Alden, J.	2,981	44.9	▲5.0
Labour	Emery, B.	2,875	43.3	▼2.5
Liberal Democrats	Moss, J.	633	9.5	▼3.2
Green	Bozic, N.	153	2.3	▼0.1
Majority		106	1.6	▼5.2
Turnout		6,642	38.2	▼3.0
Conservative hold		Swing	-	

1995 Birmingham City Council election Harborne
Party	Candidate	Votes	%	±%
Labour	Rust, A.	3,288	45.8	▲11.8
Conservative	Zissman, B.	2,802	39.1	▼2.4
Liberal Democrats	Moss, J.	912	12.7	▼8.4
Green	Squire, A.	171	2.4	▼0.9
Margin of victory		486	6.8	▼0.7
Turnout		7,173	41.2	▼4.9
Labour gain from Conservative		Swing	-	

1994 Birmingham City Council election Harborne
Party	Candidate	Votes	%	±%
Conservative	Hollingworth, P.	3,309	41.5	▼21.7
Labour	Bowen, S.	2,714	34.0	▲9.1
Liberal Democrats	Harmer, R.	1,686	21.1	▲12.7
Green	Squire, A.	263	3.3	▼0.2
Majority		595	7.5	▼30.8
Turnout		7,972	46.1	▲6.1
Conservative hold		Swing	-	

1992 Birmingham City Council election Harborne
Party	Candidate	Votes	%	±%
Conservative	Alden, J.	4,425	63.2	▲11.3
Labour	Harrison, D.	1,743	24.9	▼5.6
Liberal Democrats	Harmer, R.	590	8.4	▼3.9
Green	Squire, A.	247	3.5	▼1.8
Majority		2,682	38.3	▲16.9
Turnout		7005	40.0	▼4.2
Conservative hold		Swing	-	

1991 Birmingham City Council elections Harborne
Party	Candidate	Votes	%	±%
Conservative	Zissman, B.	4,043	51.9	▲6.0
Labour	Fargher, B.	2,374	30.5	▼11.2
Liberal Democrats	Boyle, C.	956	12.3	NEW
Green	Hurdley, J.	411	5.3	▼7.0
Majority		1,669	21.4	▲17.2
Turnout		7,784	44.2	▼4.5
Conservative hold		Swing	-	

1990 Birmingham City Council election Harborne
Party	Candidate	Votes	%	±%
Conservative	Hollingworth, P.	3,950	45.9	▼5.1
Labour	Fargher, B.	3,588	41.7	▲7.5
Green	Hurdley, J.	1,061	12.3	▲8.5
Majority		362	4.2	▼12.6
Turnout		8,599	48.7	▲7.5
Conservative hold		Swing	-	

=== 1980 ===
1988 Birmingham City Council election Harborne
Party	Candidate	Votes	%	±%
Conservative	Alden, J.	3,786	51.0	▼2.4
Labour	Fargher, B.	2,542	34.2	▲11.7
SLD	Bertram, C.	814	11.0	NEW
Green	Squire, A.	282	3.8	▼1.4
Majority		1,244	16.8	▼14.1
Turnout		7,424	41.2	▲4.9
Conservative hold		Swing	-	

1987 Birmingham City Council election Harborne
Party	Candidate	Votes	%	±%
Conservative	Zissman, B.	4,449	53.4	▲7.0
Labour	Chandler, A.	1,875	22.5	▼4.0
Alliance	Vaughan, C.	1,813	21.7	▼2.2
Green	Hurdley, J.	202	2.4	▼0.9
Majority		2,574	30.9	▲11.1
Turnout		8,339	46.1	▲4.7
Conservative hold		Swing	-	

1986 Birmingham City Council election Harborne
Party	Candidate	Votes	%	±%
Conservative	Hollingworth, P.	3,430	46.4	▼7.9
Labour	Chandler, A.	1,963	26.5	▼3.2
Alliance	Vaughan, C.	1,765	23.9	▲10.7
Green	Squire, A.	242	3.3	NEW
Majority		1,467	19.8	▼4.8
Turnout		7,400	41.4	▲2.1
Conservative hold		Swing	-	

1984 Birmingham City Council election Harborne
Party	Candidate	Votes	%	±%
Conservative	Alden, J.	3,821	54.3	▼3.2
Labour	Bridger, D.	2,089	29.7	▲5.7
Alliance	Vaughan, C.	926	13.2	▼2
Ecology	Hurdley, J.	152	2.2	▼1.1
Communist	Davis, P.	43	0.6	NEW
Majority		1,732	24.6	▼8.9
Turnout		7,031	39.3	▼1.9
Conservative hold		Swing	-	

1983 Birmingham City Council elections Harborne
Party	Candidate	Votes	%	±%
Conservative	Zissman, B.	4,249	57.5	▲9.2
Labour	Bridger, D.	1,775	24.0	▲3.1
Alliance	Vaughan, C.	1,123	15.2	▼8.8
Ecology	Hurdley, J.	241	3.3	▼3.5
Majority		2,474	33.5	▲9.3
Turnout		7,388	41.2	▼1.3
Conservative hold		Swing	-	

1982 Birmingham City Council election Harborne
Party	Candidate	Votes	%	±%
Conservative	Hollingworth, P.	3,910	48.3	▼5.3
Conservative	Bailey, J.	3,544		
Conservative	Zissman, B.	3,506		
Alliance	Chitham, E.	1,939	24.0	NEW
Alliance	Holt, R.	1,702		
Labour	Bridger, D.	1,693	20.9	▼7.3
Labour	Green, D.	1,655		
Alliance	Wheldall, K.	1,647		−
Labour	Hadley, P.	1,558		−
Ecology	Hurdley, J.	546	6.8	▲0.7
Majority		-	24.4	▼1.0
Turnout		-	42.5	▲9.6
Conservative hold		Swing	-	
Conservative hold		Swing	-	
Conservative hold		Swing	-	

1980 Birmingham City Council election Harborne
Party	Candidate	Votes	%	±%
Conservative	ZIssman, B.	3,229	53.6	▼10.6
Labour	Lovekin, I.	1,701	28.2	▼7.6
Liberal	Weston, C.	653	10.8	NEW
Ecology	Hunt, R.	365	6.1	NEW
E&D	Goulden, D.	76	1.3	NEW
Majority		1,528	25.4	▼3.0
Turnout		6,024	32.9	▼37.1
Conservative hold		Swing	-	

=== 1970s ===
1979 Birmingham City Council election Harborne
Party	Candidate	Votes	%	±%
Conservative	Bailey, J.	8,316	64.2	▼5.1
Labour	Allcock, R.	4,639	35.8	▼11.5
Majority		1,677	28.4	▼16.6
Turnout		12,955	70.0	▲36.8
Conservative hold		Swing	-	

1978 Birmingham City Council election Harborne
Party	Candidate	Votes	%	±%
Conservative	Hollingworth, P.	4,219	69.3	▼2.0
Labour	Eynon, G.	1,482	24.3	▲4.8
Liberal	Kierman, P.	387	6.4	▼2.8
Majority		2,737	45.0	▼6.8
Turnout		6,088	33.2	▼4.6
Conservative hold		Swing	-	

1976 Birmingham City Council election Harborne
Party	Candidate	Votes	%	±%
Conservative	Zissman, B.	5,004	71.3	▲7.8
Labour	Yapp, C.	1,367	19.5	▲1.6
Liberal	Eden, L.	646	9.2	▼3.2
Majority		3,637	51.8	▲6.2
Turnout		7,017	37.8	▲5.2
Conservative hold		Swing	-	

1975 Birmingham City Council election Harborne
Party	Candidate	Votes	%	±%
Conservative	Bailey, J.	3,939	63.5	▲0.5
Labour	Paris, C.	1,111	17.9	▼6.4
Liberal	Eden, L.	771	12.4	▼0.7
National Front	Barlow, R.	294	4.7	NEW
Independent Liberal	Goulden, D.	93	1.5	NEW
Majority		2,828	45.6	▲7.0
Turnout		6,208	32.6	▼3.4
Conservative hold		Swing	-	

1973 Birmingham City Council election Harborne
Party	Candidate	Votes	%	±%
Conservative	Hollingworth, P.	3,490	63.0	
Conservative	Zissman, B.	3,318		−
Conservative	Bailey, J.	3,265		−
Labour	Griffiths, B.	1,348	24.3	
Labour	Symons, A.	1,268		
Labour	Knowles, R.	1,168		−
Liberal	Goulden, D.	705	12.7	−
Liberal	Snow, R.	659		−
Liberal	Bates, K.	632		−
Majority		-	38.6	−
Turnout		-	29.2	−
Conservative win		(new seat)		
Conservative win		(new seat)		
Conservative win		(new seat)		
