= 2006 Birmingham City Council election =

2006 UK local government election

← 2004	4 May 2006	2007 →

One third of seats (41 of 118) to Birmingham City Council 60 seats needed for a majority
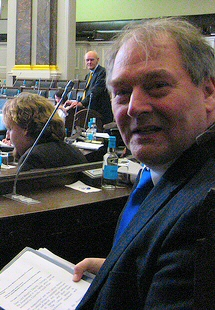

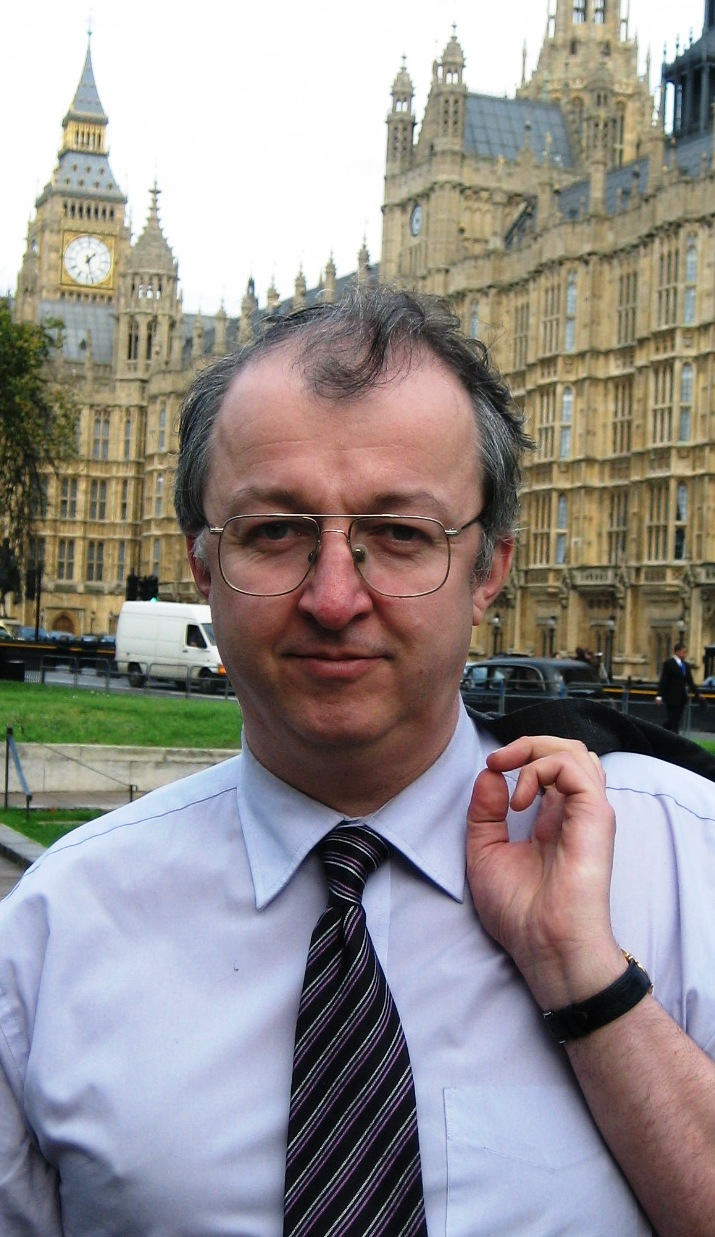
	First party	Second party	Third party
Leader	Mike Whitby	Albert Bore	John Hemming
Party	Conservative	Labour	Liberal Democrats
Leader's seat	Harborne	Ladywood	South Yardley
Seats won	16	15	9
Seats after	41	41	33
Seat change	▲2	▼3	▲1
Popular vote	68,134	82,120	58,349
Percentage	26.1%	31.5%	22.4%
Swing	▲3.0%	▲4.0%	▼1.0%
	Fourth party
Party	Respect
Seats won	1
Seats after	1
Seat change	▲1
Popular vote	8,227
Percentage	3.2%
Swing	New
- Map of the 2006 Birmingham City Council election results. Labour in red, Conservatives in blue, Liberal Democrats in yellow and Respect in green.
Majority party before election
No overall control
Majority party after election
No overall control

The 2006 Birmingham City Council election took place on 4 May 2006 to elect members of Birmingham City Council in West Midlands, England. One third of the council was up for election, with an extra vacancy in Kingstanding due to pending legal proceedings. The result for Kingstanding was the subject of an election petition after errors at the count led to Sharon Ebanks (BNP) being wrongly declared elected.

== Election result ==
The results saw the council remain in no overall control, with the Conservatives winning the most seats in this election, leading to the Conservatives and Labour holding an equal number of seats on the council.

Birmingham City Council Election Result 2006
Party	Seats	Gains	Losses	Net gain/loss	Seats %	Votes %	Votes	+/−
Conservative	16	2	0	▲2	39.0	26.1	68,134	▲3.0
Labour	15	1	4	▼3	36.6	31.5	82,120	▲4.0
Liberal Democrats	9	2	1	▲1	22.0	22.4	58,349	▼1.0
Respect	1	1	0	▲1	2.4	3.2	8,227	New
BNP	0	0	0	Steady	0.0	11.1	29,045	▲4.0
Green	0	0	0	Steady	0.0	4.9	12,801	▼3.4
Independent	0	0	0	Steady	0.0	0.4	1,173	▼1.9
UKIP	0	0	0	Steady	0.0	0.3	682	▼3.5
National Front	0	0	0	Steady	0.0	0.1	199	▼0.3
Monster Raving Loony	0	0	0	Steady	0.0	0.0	104	New
Legalise Cannabis Alliance	0	0	0	Steady	0.0	0.0	45	0.0

== Ward results ==
=== Acocks Green ===
Acocks Green
Party	Candidate	Votes	%	±%
Liberal Democrats	Iain Bowen	2,607	43.0	
Labour	John O'Shea	1,632	26.9	
BNP	Patrick Collins	927	15.3	
Conservative	Kenneth Axford	630	10.4	
Green	Mina Coalter	261	4.3	
Turnout			31.4	
Liberal Democrats hold		Swing		

=== Aston ===
Aston
Party	Candidate	Votes	%	±%
Labour	Ziaul Islam	3,234	46.6	
Liberal Democrats	Abdul Khalique	2,698	38.9	
Independent	Kenneth Jeffers	283	4.1	
Respect	Alliya Stennett	242	3.5	
Conservative	Mohammed Mushtaq	213	3.1	
BNP	Dennis Phillips	170	2.4	
Green	Geoffrey Tapalu	100	1.4	
Turnout			40.1	
Labour gain from Liberal Democrats		Swing		

=== Bartley Green ===
Bartley Green
Party	Candidate	Votes	%	±%
Conservative	Bruce Lines	3,298	53.4	
Labour	Stephen Mansell-Green	1,399	22.7	
BNP	Philip Rudge	824	13.4	
Liberal Democrats	John Hemming	406	6.6	
Green	Steven Goodsell	244	4.0	
Turnout			35.2	
Conservative hold		Swing		

=== Billesley ===
Billesley
Party	Candidate	Votes	%	±%
Conservative	Susan Axford	2,608	38.6	
Labour	Dean Burfoot	2,110	31.2	
BNP	Jeffrey Cahill	1,034	15.3	
Liberal Democrats	Tony King	692	10.2	
Green	Margaret James	310	4.6	
Turnout			36.3	
Conservative hold		Swing		

=== Bordesley Green ===
Bordesley Green
Party	Candidate	Votes	%	±%
Liberal Democrats	Zaker Choudry	4,267	49.4	
Labour	Zafar Iqbal	3,273	37.9	
BNP	Michael Jones	390	4.5	
Conservative	David Barrie	382	4.4	
Green	Alan Clawley	332	3.8	
Turnout			44.1	
Liberal Democrats gain from People's Justice		Swing		

=== Bournville ===
Bournville
Party	Candidate	Votes	%	±%
Conservative	Bill Evans	3,200	40.4	
Labour	Peter Griffiths	1,974	24.9	
Liberal Democrats	Philip Banting	1,107	14.0	
BNP	Malcolm Doughty	776	9.8	
Green	Barney Smith	765	9.7	
Monster Raving Loony	Stuart Estell	104	1.3	
Turnout			41.1	
Conservative hold		Swing		

=== Brandwood ===
Brandwood
Party	Candidate	Votes	%	±%
Conservative	Kenneth Hardeman	2,571	36.9	
Labour	Gary Mills	2,262	32.4	
BNP	Gemma Orton	887	12.7	
Liberal Democrats	Philip Wagg	801	11.5	
Green	Anna Masters	453	6.5	
Turnout			39.9	
Conservative hold		Swing		

=== Edgbaston ===
Edgbaston
Party	Candidate	Votes	%	±%
Conservative	Fergus Robinson	2,503	50.3	
Labour	Jagvinder Singh Gill	1,311	26.4	
Liberal Democrats	Nicholas da Costa	586	11.8	
Green	Joseph Rooney	356	7.2	
BNP	Peter Lawrie	218	4.4	
Turnout			31.5	
Conservative hold		Swing		

=== Erdington ===
Erdington
Party	Candidate	Votes	%	±%
Conservative	Robert Alden	2,210	38.1	
Labour	Susanna McCorry	1,889	32.5	
BNP	Elizabeth Wainwright	826	14.2	
Liberal Democrats	Gareth Hardy	559	9.6	
Green	Mark Oley	321	5.5	
Turnout			35.2	
Conservative gain from Labour		Swing		

=== Hall Green ===
Hall Green
Party	Candidate	Votes	%	±%
Liberal Democrats	Paula Smith	3,481	43.1	
Conservative	Robert Harvey	2,319	28.7	
Labour	Samuel Burden	1,288	16.0	
BNP	Terence Larkin	656	8.1	
Green	Lydia Bradshaw	245	3.0	
UKIP	Peter Hillman	84	1.0	
Turnout			43.5	
Liberal Democrats hold		Swing		

=== Handsworth Wood ===
Handsworth Wood
Party	Candidate	Votes	%	±%
Labour	Narinder Kaur Kooner	3,300	47.9	
Conservative	Arjan Singh	1,907	27.7	
Liberal Democrats	Kingsley Douglas	979	14.2	
Green	Joan Fairclough	410	6.0	
BNP	Darren Conlan	291	4.2	
Turnout			37.0	
Labour hold		Swing		

=== Harborne ===
Harborne
Party	Candidate	Votes	%	±%
Conservative	Michael Whitby	3,200	48.3	
Labour	John Priest	1,823	27.5	
Green	Philip Simpson	665	10.0	
Liberal Democrats	Mohammed Sagier	577	8.7	
BNP	Josephine Larkin	364	5.5	
Turnout			40.5	
Conservative hold		Swing		

=== Hodge Hill ===
Hodge Hill
Party	Candidate	Votes	%	±%
Labour	Gillian Beddows	2,342	34.5	
Liberal Democrats	Gwyn Neilly	2,026	29.8	
BNP	Denis Adams	1,123	16.5	
Conservative	Paul Valdmanis	724	10.7	
UKIP	Peter Johnson	402	5.9	
Green	Daniel Cook	173	2.5	
Turnout			39.5	
Labour hold		Swing		

=== Kings Norton ===
Kings Norton
Party	Candidate	Votes	%	±%
Conservative	Margaret Sutton	2,344	40.3	
Labour	Stewart Stacey	1,822	31.3	
BNP	Malcolm Owen	854	14.7	
Liberal Democrats	Brian Peace	458	7.9	
Green	Robert Card	338	5.8	
Turnout			34.9	
Conservative hold		Swing		

=== Kingstanding ===
Kingstanding (2)
Party	Candidate	Votes	%	±%
Labour	Zoe Hopkins	1,894	32.6	
Labour	Catharine Grundy	1,823		
BNP	Sharon Ebanks	1,329	22.9	
Conservative	Mick Hawker	1,134	19.5	
Conservative	Robert Higginson	966		
Independent	Terry Williams	615	10.6	
Liberal Democrats	Mark Haddon	514	8.9	
Liberal Democrats	Hubert Duffy	446		
Green	Richard Pitt	315	5.4	
Independent	Anne Bennet	171		
Independent	Mohammed Malik	58		
Turnout			29.2	
Labour hold		Swing		
Labour hold		Swing		

=== Ladywood ===
Ladywood
Party	Candidate	Votes	%	±%
Labour	Carl Rice	1,645	51.2	
Conservative	Peter Smallbone	632	19.7	
Liberal Democrats	Zalal Choudhury	439	13.7	
Green	Damien Duff	263	8.2	
BNP	Keith Axon	237	7.4	
Turnout			21.1	
Labour hold		Swing		

=== Longbridge ===
Longbridge
Party	Candidate	Votes	%	±%
Conservative	Susan Barton	2,021	35.3	
Labour	Amy Watson	1,818	31.8	
BNP	Stephen Heath	1,048	18.3	
Liberal Democrats	Sven Harvey	559	9.8	
Green	William van Marle	272	4.8	
Turnout			31.6	
Conservative gain from Labour		Swing		

=== Lozells and East Handsworth ===
Lozells and East Handsworth
Party	Candidate	Votes	%	±%
Labour	Kim Kaur Brom	3,300	46.4	
Liberal Democrats	Mohammed Aslam	1,657	23.3	
Respect	Raghib Ahsan	1,370	19.3	
Conservative	Merisha Stevenson	495	7.0	
Green	Eric Fairclough	208	2.9	
BNP	Zane Patchell	79	1.1	
Turnout			38.3	
Labour hold		Swing		

=== Moseley and Kings Heath ===
Moseley and Kings Heath
Party	Candidate	Votes	%	±%
Liberal Democrats	Ernest Hendricks	2,502	33.2	
Labour	Barry Henley	2,361	31.3	
Conservative	Aysan al-Haq	1,006	13.3	
Green	Stuart Masters	741	9.8	
Respect	Lynne Hubbard	586	7.8	
BNP	Keith Davis	347	4.6	
Turnout			40.9	
Liberal Democrats gain from Labour		Swing		

=== Nechells ===
Nechells
Party	Candidate	Votes	%	±%
Labour	Chaudhry Rashid	2,305	51.0	
Liberal Democrats	Mohammed Khan	969	21.4	
Conservative	Mohammed Akram	458	10.1	
BNP	David Glover	404	8.9	
Green	Janet Assheton	384	8.5	
Turnout			25.7	
Labour hold		Swing		

=== Northfield ===
Northfield
Party	Candidate	Votes	%	±%
Conservative	Randal Brew	2,674	38.7	
Labour	Brian Seymour-Smith	1,883	27.2	
BNP	Leslie Orton	1,243	18.0	
Liberal Democrats	Andrew Moles	705	10.2	
Green	Susan Pearce	413	6.0	
Turnout			37.1	
Conservative hold		Swing		

=== Oscott ===
Oscott
Party	Candidate	Votes	%	±%
Labour	June Dring	2,122	31.7	
Conservative	Graham Green	2,104	31.4	
BNP	Gerard McLaughlin	1,652	24.7	
Liberal Democrats	Jonathan Hassall	564	8.4	
Green	Harry Eyles	252	3.8	
Turnout			37.1	
Labour hold		Swing		

=== Perry Barr ===
Perry Barr
Party	Candidate	Votes	%	±%
Liberal Democrats	Karen Hamilton	3,077	47.1	
Labour	Rabinder Singh Gill	1,555	23.8	
BNP	Alan Chamberlain	1,045	16.0	
Conservative	Meirion Jenkins	633	9.7	
Green	Lester Mundy	224	3.4	
Turnout			39.7	
Liberal Democrats hold		Swing		

=== Quinton ===
Quinton
Party	Candidate	Votes	%	±%
Conservative	Jennifer James	3,034	39.7	
Labour	Brenda Dacosta	2,932	38.4	
BNP	Alan Meer	681	8.9	
Liberal Democrats	Susan Sherwen	511	6.7	
Green	Peter Beck	350	4.6	
Independent	Paul Bayliss	131	1.7	
Turnout			44.3	
Conservative hold		Swing		

=== Selly Oak ===
Selly Oak
Party	Candidate	Votes	%	±%
Liberal Democrats	David Radcliffe	2,503	41.4	
Labour	David Williams	1,616	26.7	
Conservative	Barbara Wood	1,042	17.2	
Green	Peter Tinsley	554	9.2	
BNP	Paul Billingham	328	5.4	
Turnout			32.6	
Liberal Democrats hold		Swing		

=== Shard End ===
Shard End
Party	Candidate	Votes	%	±%
Labour	Margaret Byrne	2,016	39.5	
BNP	Mark Neary	1,320	25.9	
Conservative	Paul Burke	937	18.4	
Liberal Democrats	Bryan Brooke	565	11.1	
Green	John Read	150	2.9	
UKIP	Joyce Ware	117	2.3	
Turnout			28.2	
Labour hold		Swing		

=== Sheldon ===
Sheldon
Party	Candidate	Votes	%	±%
Liberal Democrats	Michael Ward	3,233	54.1	
BNP	Robert Devenport	1,132	19.0	
Labour	Michael Johnson	792	13.3	
Conservative	Derek Johnson	556	9.3	
Green	Michael Sheridan	139	2.3	
National Front	Paul Morris	74	1.2	
Legalise Cannabis Alliance	Colin Preece	45	0.8	
Turnout			38.2	
Liberal Democrats hold		Swing		

=== Soho ===
Soho
Party	Candidate	Votes	%	±%
Labour	Serveliata Hargreaves	3,343	57.1	
Liberal Democrats	Asif Yousaf	1,541	26.3	
Conservative	David Williams-Masinda	502	8.6	
Green	Huw Davies	294	5.0	
BNP	Darren Allen	173	3.0	
Turnout			35.0	
Labour hold		Swing		

=== South Yardley ===
South Yardley
Party	Candidate	Votes	%	±%
Liberal Democrats	James Whorwood	3,249	47.8	
Labour	Javed Iqbal	1,470	21.6	
BNP	Tanya Whitehead	1,001	14.7	
Conservative	Pervez Akhtar	640	9.4	
Green	Hazel Clawley	311	4.6	
National Front	Ian Lake	125	1.8	
Turnout			36.3	
Liberal Democrats hold		Swing		

=== Sparkbrook ===
Sparkbrook
Party	Candidate	Votes	%	±%
Respect	Salma Yaqoob	4,339	49.4	
Labour	Mohammed Azim	2,700	30.7	
Liberal Democrats	Adil Rashid	990	11.3	
Conservative	William Hordern	343	3.9	
Green	Charles Alldrick	309	3.5	
BNP	Matthew Benton	109	1.2	
Turnout			46.3	
Respect gain from Labour		Swing		

=== Springfield ===
Springfield
Party	Candidate	Votes	%	±%
Labour	Mohammed Fazal	2,910	37.1	
Liberal Democrats	Roger Harmer	2,437	31.1	
Respect	Salma Iqbal	1,690	21.5	
Conservative	Mahindarpal Singh	487	6.2	
BNP	Lynette Orton	323	4.1	
Turnout			41.5	
Labour hold		Swing		

=== Stechford and Yardley North ===
Stechford and Yardley North
Party	Candidate	Votes	%	±%
Liberal Democrats	Carol Jones	3,059	48.9	
Labour	John Bliss	1,172	18.7	
BNP	Robert Purcell	1,112	17.8	
Conservative	Robert Clark	536	8.6	
Green	Edith Roberts	158	2.5	
Independent	Anthony Brooks	144	2.3	
UKIP	Alan Ware	79	1.3	
Turnout			35.3	
Liberal Democrats hold		Swing		

=== Stockland Green ===
Stockland Green
Party	Candidate	Votes	%	±%
Labour	Barbara Tassa	2,165	43.0	
Conservative	Jackie Banks	1,174	23.3	
BNP	Richard Lumby	777	15.4	
Liberal Democrats	Richard Pearson	606	12.0	
Green	John Bentley	316	6.3	
Turnout			31.4	
Labour hold		Swing		

=== Sutton Four Oaks ===
Sutton Four Oaks
Party	Candidate	Votes	%	±%
Conservative	Dorothea Underwood	4,858	66.6	
Liberal Democrats	Jane Robins	848	11.6	
BNP	Maureen Davies	679	9.3	
Labour	Manish Puri	577	7.9	
Green	Ulla Grant	331	4.5	
Turnout			39.4	
Conservative hold		Swing		

=== Sutton New Hall ===
Sutton New Hall
Party	Candidate	Votes	%	±%
Conservative	June Fuller	3,715	57.6	
Labour	Christopher Hillcox	899	13.9	
BNP	Carl Brisker	851	13.2	
Liberal Democrats	Jean Woods	672	10.4	
Green	Jim Orford	309	4.8	
Turnout			37.0	
Conservative hold		Swing		

=== Sutton Trinity ===
Sutton Trinity
Party	Candidate	Votes	%	±%
Conservative	Alberta Waddington	3,624	55.2	
Labour	Roger Barley	1,036	15.8	
Liberal Democrats	Maureen Parker	828	12.6	
BNP	Stephen Morris	718	10.9	
Green	Bert Gedin	361	5.5	
Turnout			34.4	
Conservative hold		Swing		

=== Sutton Vesey ===
Sutton Vesey
Party	Candidate	Votes	%	±%
Conservative	Alan Rudge	3,602	50.8	
Labour	Robert Pocock	1,444	20.4	
Liberal Democrats	Sidney Woods	822	11.6	
BNP	Norman Ashton	796	11.2	
Green	Judith Orford	422	6.0	
Turnout			38.9	
Conservative hold		Swing		

=== Tyburn ===
Tyburn
Party	Candidate	Votes	%	±%
Labour	Lynda Clinton	1,643	36.4	
Conservative	Gerald Brien	1,071	23.7	
BNP	Lee Windridge	897	19.9	
Liberal Democrats	John Line	702	15.6	
Green	Tamara Young	197	4.4	
Turnout			27.0	
Labour hold		Swing		

=== Washwood Heath ===
Washwood Heath
Party	Candidate	Votes	%	±%
Labour	Mohammed Idrees	4,990	55.5	
Liberal Democrats	Hakil Ahmed	2,795	31.1	
Conservative	Wilfred Holland	540	6.0	
BNP	Graham Jones	420	4.7	
Green	Elinor Stanton	248	2.8	
Turnout			47.1	
Labour hold		Swing		

=== Weoley ===
Weoley
Party	Candidate	Votes	%	±%
Conservative	Peter Osborn	2,207	35.9	
Labour	Michael Drinkwater	1,873	30.5	
BNP	Julie Ashton	1,004	16.3	
Liberal Democrats	Trevor Sword	758	12.3	
Green	David Toke	307	5.0	
Turnout			34.8	
Conservative hold		Swing		
