= 1998 Birmingham City Council election =

1998 UK local government election

← 1996	7 May 1998	1999 →
	First party	Second party	Third party
Party	Labour	Conservative	Liberal Democrats
Seats won	83	17	16
Seat change	▼3	▲3	▼1
Council control before election
Labour
Council control after election
Labour

The 1998 Birmingham City Council election took place on 7 May 1998 to elect members of Birmingham City Council in the West Midlands, England. One third of the council was up for election and the Labour Party kept overall control of the council.

== Result ==
Birmingham local election result 1998
Party	Seats	Gains	Losses	Net gain/loss	Seats %	Votes %	Votes	+/−
Labour	26			▼3	66.7			
Conservative	7			▲3	17.9			
Liberal Democrats	5			▼1	12.8			
Others	1			▲1	2.6			
