= Lozells and East Handsworth (ward) =

Coordinates: 52.493°N 1.902°W

- Ward
- Location within the West Midlands
- Population: 31,074 (2011 Ward)
  - Density: 89.3 per ha
- OS grid reference: SP057900
- Metropolitan borough: Birmingham
- Metropolitan county: West Midlands
- Region: West Midlands
- Country: England
- Sovereign state: United Kingdom
- Post town: BIRMINGHAM
- Postcode district: B19-B21
- Dialling code: 0121
- Police: West Midlands
- Fire: West Midlands
- Ambulance: West Midlands
- UK Parliament: Birmingham Perry Barr

Lozells and East Handsworth was a ward in Birmingham, England, created at the June 2004 elections. It was represented by 3 councillors on Birmingham City Council. It was superseded in 2018 by the single-member wards of Handsworth, Lozells and Birchfield.

== Population ==
The 2001 Population Census recorded that there were 28,806 people living in the ward. The ward has an ethnic minority population of 82.6%, the largest portion of which is of Pakistani descent, mainly from Mirpur.

- White British – 4,110
- South Asian – 15,706
- Black British – 5,524
- Mixed Race – 1,048
- Chinese or Other – 842
