= Sutton Four Oaks (ward) =

Coordinates: 52.5880°N 1.8258°W

- Ward
- Location within the West Midlands
- Population: 24,025 (2011Ward)
  - Density: 16.7 per ha
- OS grid reference: SP105995
- Metropolitan borough: Birmingham
- Metropolitan county: West Midlands
- Region: West Midlands
- Country: England
- Sovereign state: United Kingdom
- Post town: SUTTON COLDFIELD
- Postcode district: B74
- Dialling code: 0121
- Police: West Midlands
- Fire: West Midlands
- Ambulance: West Midlands
- UK Parliament: Sutton Coldfield

Sutton Four Oaks is one of the 40 electoral wards in Birmingham, England.

Sutton Four Oaks is one of the four wards that make up the Parliamentary Constituency and council constituency of Sutton Coldfield. The ward lies to the north of Sutton Coldfield town centre and covers Hill Hook, Hill Wood, Roughley, Doe Bank, Ley Hill, Four Oaks, Four Oaks Park and Mere Green. Mere Green is the main shopping area for the ward and also has the ward's only library.

It covers an area of 19.61 square kilometres (7.57 sq mi).

== Population ==
According to the 2001 Population Census there were 21,690 people living in 9,274 households in Sutton Four Oaks. 4.9% (1,068) of the ward's population consisted of ethnic minorities compared to 29.6% for Birmingham in general. The population had increased to 24,205 at the 2011 Census.

== Politics ==
Sutton Four Oaks is represented by Cllr Maureen Cornish on Birmingham City Council, and Cllrs Clare Horrocks and Simon Ward on Royal Sutton Coldfield Town Council.

Maureen, Clare and Simon all represent the Conservative Party.
