= Sutton Vesey (ward) =

Coordinates: 52°32′36″N 1°50′22″W

- Ward
- Location within the West Midlands
- Area: 2.48 sq mi (6.4 km^{2})
- Population: 23,360 (2011.Ward)
  - Density: 9,419/sq mi (3,637/km^{2})
- OS grid reference: SP118941
- Metropolitan borough: Birmingham
- Metropolitan county: West Midlands
- Region: West Midlands
- Country: England
- Sovereign state: United Kingdom
- Post town: SUTTON COLDFIELD
- Postcode district: B73, B23
- Dialling code: 0121
- Police: West Midlands
- Fire: West Midlands
- Ambulance: West Midlands
- UK Parliament: Sutton Coldfield

Sutton Vesey is one of the 69 electoral wards in Birmingham, England.

Sutton Vesey is one of the four wards that make up the Parliamentary Constituency and council constituency of Sutton Coldfield. The ward lies to the south of Sutton Coldfield town centre and Sutton Park and includes the neighbourhoods of Boldmere, Banners Gate and parts of New Oscott and Wylde Green. It covers an area of 2.48 square miles (6.4 km^{2}).

The area is served by Boldmere Library.

== Population ==
According to the 2001 Population Census there were 22,879 people living in 9,391 households in Sutton Vesey. 6.5% (1,483) of the ward's population consists of ethnic minorities compared with 29.6% for Birmingham in general. The population at the 2011 Census had increased to 23,360 in 9,635 households at the 2011 Census.

== Politics ==
The two councillors presently representing Sutton Vesey on Birmingham City Council are John Cooper (Local Campaigner and Conservative Party) and Anja Pawson (Conservative).

Sutton Vesey has adopted a Ward Support Officer. Further details of advice bureaux and the councillors can be found on the Sutton Vesey page of the council website.

== Etymology ==
It is named after John Vesey, Bishop of Exeter who opened up Sutton Park and founded Bishop Vesey's Grammar School in Sutton Coldfield.
