= Bordesley and Highgate =

Electoral ward in Birmingham, England

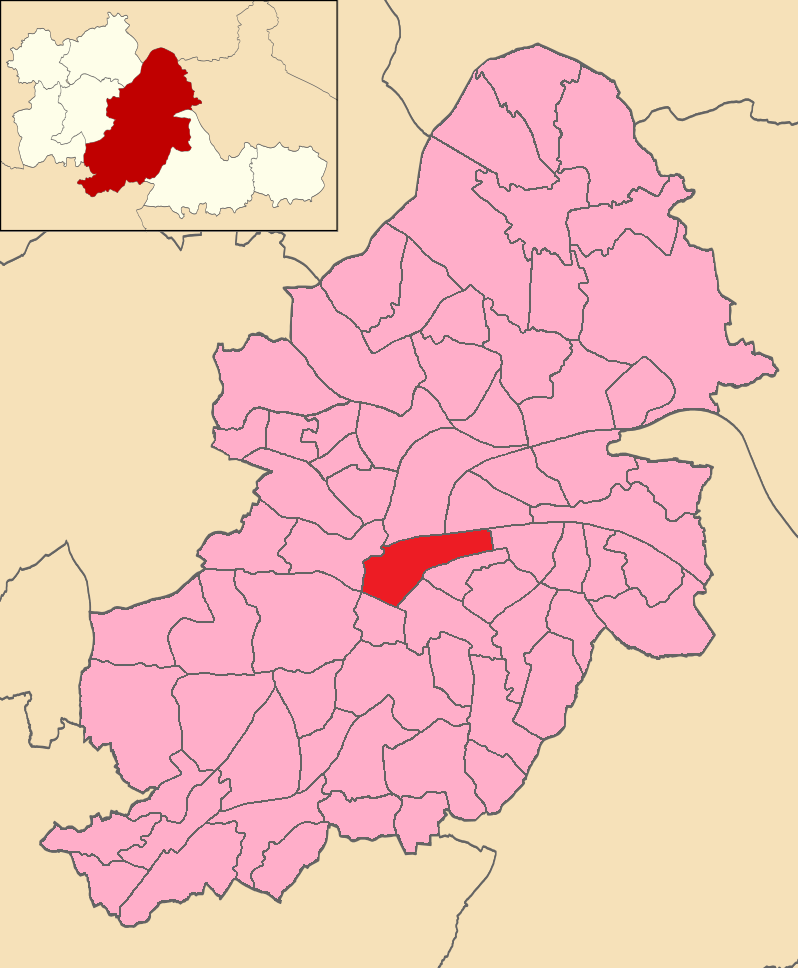
- Bordesley and Highgate ward shown with Birmingham City Council
- Population: 13,242
- Metropolitan borough: Birmingham
- Metropolitan county: West Midlands
- Region: West Midlands
- Country: England
- Sovereign state: United Kingdom
- UK Parliament: Birmingham Ladywood
- Councillors: Ali Kazi (Green Party)

Bordesley and Highgate is an electoral ward of Birmingham City Council in the centre of Birmingham, West Midlands, England, covering an urban area immediately to the east of the city centre, including the historic district of Digbeth. The ward was created on 1 December 2017 as a result of boundary changes that saw the number of wards in Birmingham increase from 40 to 69.

== Boundaries ==
Bordesley and Highgate ward includes the Highgate, Bordesley, Digbeth and Deritend areas and as such includes some of the oldest parts of the city. The ward is in the Birmingham Ladywood UK Parliament constituency.

== Councillors ==
Election	Councillor
2026	Ali Kazi (Grn)
2022	Yvonne Mosquito (Lab)
2018	Yvonne Mosquito (Lab)

== Elections since 2018 ==
Bordesley and Highgate 2022 (1)
Party	Candidate	Votes	%	±%
Labour	Yvonne Mosquito	925	57.3	▼21.2
Conservative	Zia Talukder	311	19.3	▲11.8
Workers Party	Edward Woollard	247	15.3	N/A
Green	Martin Guest	132	8.2	▲2.2
Majority		614	38.0	
Turnout		1,615	20	
Labour hold		Swing		

Bordesley and Highgate 2018 (1)
Party	Candidate	Votes	%	±%
Labour	Yvonne Mosquito	1,176	77.8	
Liberal Democrats	Daniel Iliff	120	7.9	
Conservative	Julia Mackey	113	7.5	
Green	Tom Jenkins	90	5.9	
Majority		1,056		
Turnout		1,512	21.87	
Labour win (new seat)				
