= Theresa Stewart =

British politician (1930–2020)

91st Lord Mayor of Birmingham
- In office May 2000 – May 2001
- Preceded by: Ian McArdle
- Succeeded by: Jim Whorwhood

Leader of Birmingham City Council
- In office October 1993 – May 1999
- Preceded by: Dick Knowles
- Succeeded by: Albert Bore

Member of Birmingham City Council
- In office 1970–2002
- Constituency: Billesley

Personal details
- Born: Theresa Raisman; 24 August 1930 Leeds, England
- Died: 11 November 2020 (aged 90) Birmingham, England
- Party: Labour
- Education: Oxford University

Theresa Stewart (née Raisman; 24 August 1930 – 11 November 2020) was a British Labour Party politician and the first (and as of 2024, only) female leader of Birmingham City Council, a position which she attained in October 1993, succeeding Dick Knowles, and in competition for which she was beaten by Sir Albert Bore in May 1999. She was also Lord Mayor of Birmingham from May 2000 to May 2001, being only the sixth woman to hold that position.

Harriet Harman described her as "a pioneer for women's equality & women's representation, a true sister to me and others. A truly exceptional woman".

== Political career ==
Stewart was elected as a councillor for Birmingham City Council in a by-election in 1970. She remained a councillor, for Billesley ward, until 2002. She saw her role as a Labour Councillor as doing for poor people, what lawyers did for rich people.

She was also a member of the Birmingham Regional Hospital Board in the late 1960s. She exposed failings in the hospital system including a ward kept locked for the use of the family and friends of consultants. The issue was taken up by a local newspaper.

She was a founder of BPAS (then the Birmingham Pregnancy Advisory Group), campaigned for CND, for women's right to choose, for the family allowance to be paid to the mother as well as hosting striking miners and steelworkers in her home.

She was member and chair of Social Services in Birmingham in the 1970s and 1980s.

In 1991 she, with 20 other councillors, was expelled from the Labour Group, for opposing cuts to a children's home.

However, in 1993 she was elected, by her fellow Labour councillors, as leader of Birmingham City Council. She moved the council from spending on infrastructure and convention centres to a focus on social services and education.

She also hosted G8 in 1998, welcoming Tony Blair, Bill Clinton and Boris Yeltsin to the city. However the photo she was most proud of was the one with Nelson Mandela, which sat proudly on her mantelpiece.

== Personal life and death ==
Stewart was born in 1930 in Leeds. She was Jewish.

Stewart won a scholarship to study mathematics at Somerville College, Oxford University. She met John Stewart, who was studying PPE at Balliol College. After her degree Theresa went to work at Marconi's, she was the only woman in the graduate entry. After their marriage in 1953 Theresa trained to teach maths in Edinburgh where John was a graduate trainee in the National Coal Board. They then moved to London and on the Doncaster. During these years, they had four children. Theresa was active in the Labour Party throughout these years. They moved to Birmingham in 1966 and Theresa was elected councillor for the Billesley ward in 1970. Her husband had been appointed as a senior lecturer a INLOGOV (Institute of Local Government Studies) at the University of Birmingham,. He was later made a professor and then Director of INLOGOV.

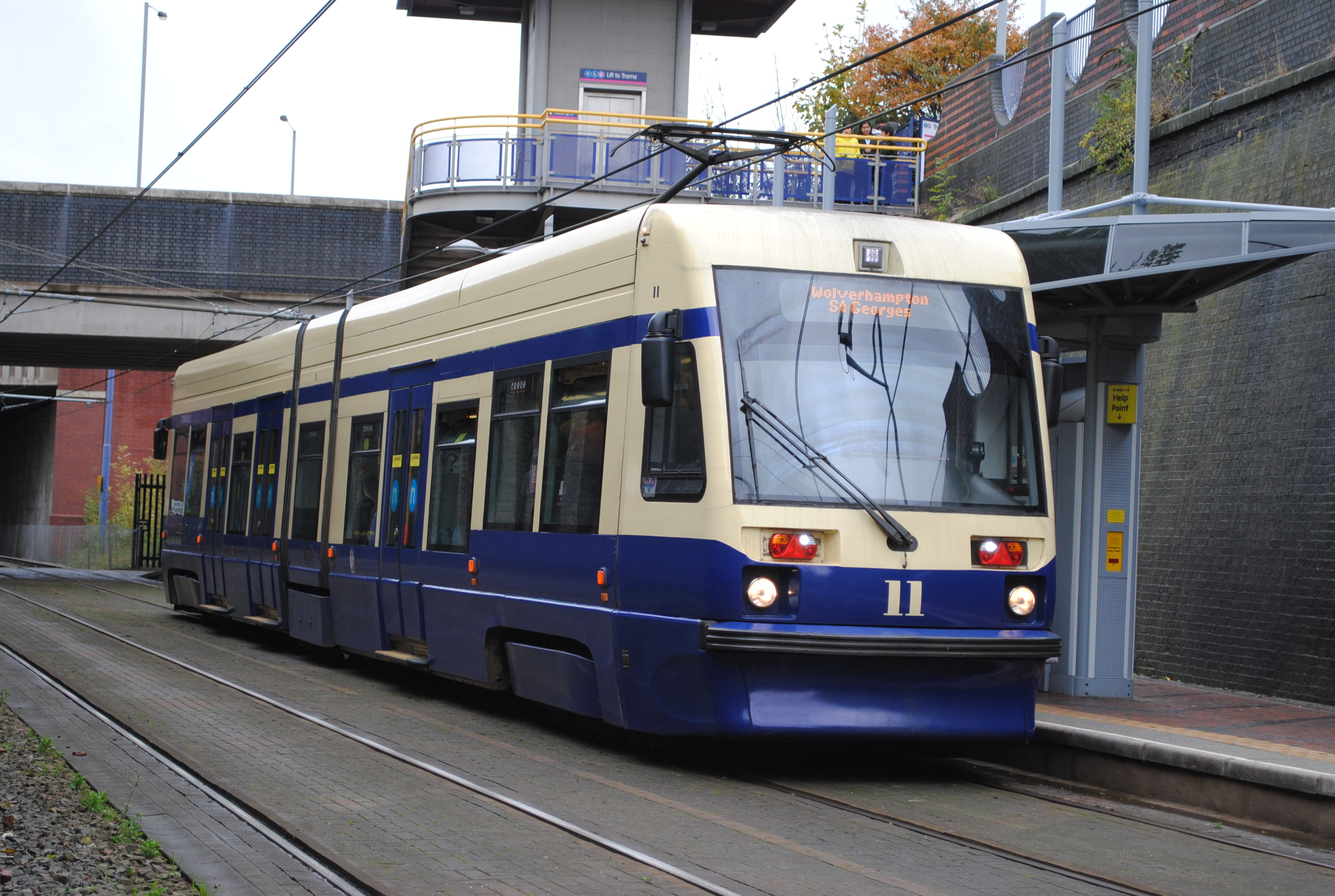
Former Midland Metro tram 11 "Theresa Stewart", in historic Birmingham Corporation Transport livery

Midland Metro named an AnsaldoBreda T-69 tram in her honour. It has since been withdrawn from service, along with the rest of its class, and—despite initial plans for Birmingham Museums to preserve it—scrapped in July 2022.

She died on 11 November 2020, at the age of 90, following a long illness. She was survived by her husband, their four children, ten grandchildren and seven great grandchildren.

Political offices
Preceded by Dick Knowles	Leader of Birmingham City Council; 1993 to 1999	Succeeded by Albert Bore
