= Allens Cross (ward) =

Electoral ward in Birmingham, England

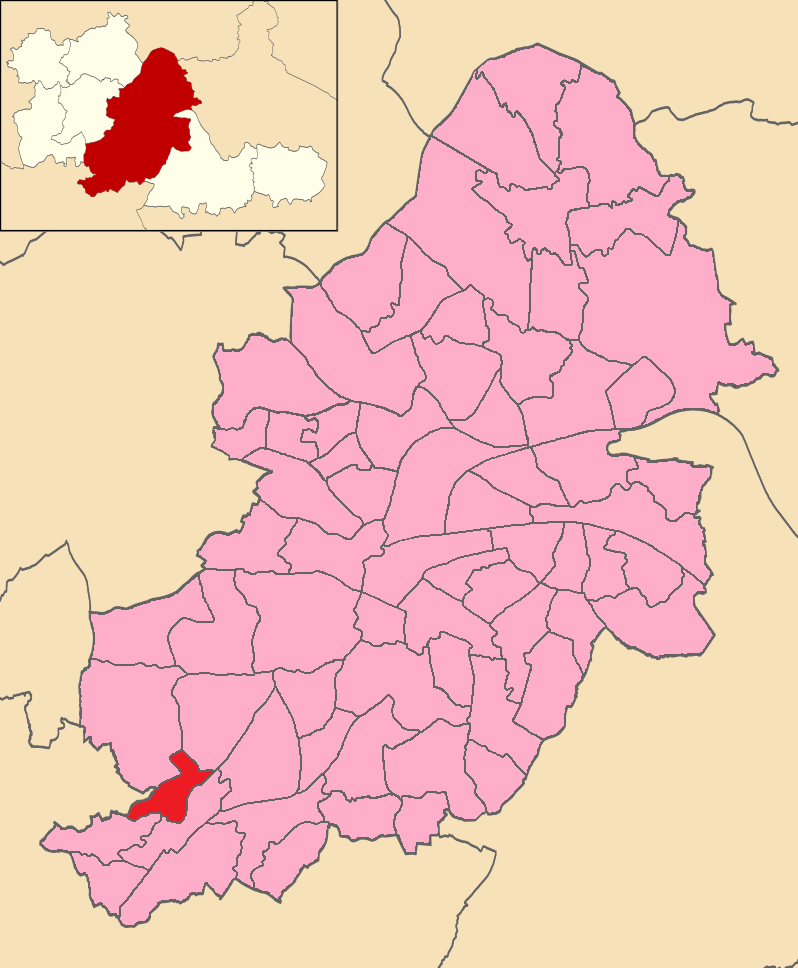
- Allens Cross ward shown with Birmingham City Council
- Population: 10,943
- Metropolitan borough: City of Birmingham
- Metropolitan county: West Midlands
- Region: West Midlands
- Country: England
- Sovereign state: United Kingdom
- UK Parliament: Birmingham Northfield
- Councillors: Jack Deakin

Allens Cross is an electoral ward of Birmingham City Council in the south west of Birmingham, West Midlands, covering an urban area to the west of Northfield shopping centre. The ward was created in 2018 as a result of boundary changes that saw the number of wards in Birmingham increase from 40 to 69.

The ward was gained by Eddie Freeman of Reform UK in the May 2026 Birmingham City Council Elections. Freeman previously represented the ward from 2018-2022 as a Conservative Party Councillor.

== Politics ==
Allens Cross ward is currently represented on Birmingham City Council by Reform UK councillor Eddie Freeman since May 2026.

The ward was largely created from the former Weoley ward and is contained within the Birmingham Northfield constituency.

== Elections since 2010 ==
=== 2020s ===
Allens Cross 2026
Party	Candidate	Votes	%	±%
Reform	Eddie Freeman	949	34.3	New
Independent	Paul Smith	651	23.5	New
Labour	Seb Lovell-Huckle	451	16.3	▼29.6
Green	Daniel Rust	381	13.8	▲8.2
Conservative	Theo Wicking	259	9.4	▼35.8
Liberal Democrats	Emil-Crisan Toescu	76	2.7	▼0.4
Majority		298	10.8	
Turnout			37.65	
Registered electors		7,317		
Reform gain from Labour		Swing		

Allens Cross 2022
Party	Candidate	Votes	%	±%
Labour	Jack Deakin	922	45.9	▲1.3
Conservative	Eddie Freeman	908	45.2	▼1.7
Green	Daniel Brian Rust	112	5.6	▲3.2
Liberal Democrats	Claire Alexandra Fielden	62	3.1	▲0.2
Majority		14	0.7	
Turnout		2,010	27.2	▼1.8
Rejected ballots		7		
Labour gain from Conservative		Swing	▲1.5	

=== 2010s ===
Allens Cross 2018 (1)
Party	Candidate	Votes	%	±%
Conservative	Eddie Freeman	1,023	48.8	
Labour Co-op	Steve Bedser	974	44.6	
Common Good	Dick Rodgers	72	3.3	
Liberal Democrats	Clare Fielden	63	2.9	
Green	Peter Beck	52	2.4	
Majority		49		
Turnout		2,189		
Conservative win (new seat)				
