= Birmingham City Council =

Local government body for the English city

- Coat of arms

- Council logo post-2015

Type
- Type: Metropolitan borough council

Leadership
- Lord Mayor: Zaker Choudhry, Liberal Democrats since 20 May 2026
- Leader: Roger Harmer, Liberal Democrats since 5 June 2026
- Deputy Leader: Julien Pritchard, Green Party since 5 June 2026
- Managing Director: Joanne Roney since September 2024

Structure
- Seats: 101 councillors
- Graph of the party split among 101 seats.
- Political groups: Administration (40) Liberal Democrat (12) Green (19) Better Birmingham Independent Group (7) Birmingham Independents Group (2) Other parties (60) Reform (21) Conservative (16) Labour (14) Birmingham Independent Workers Group (5) Independent (4) Workers (1) Independent (4) Vacancies (1) Vacant (1)
- Joint committees: West Midlands Combined Authority
- Length of term: 4 years

Elections
- Voting system: Plurality-at-large
- Last election: 7 May 2026
- Next election: 2 May 2030

Motto
- Forward

Meeting place
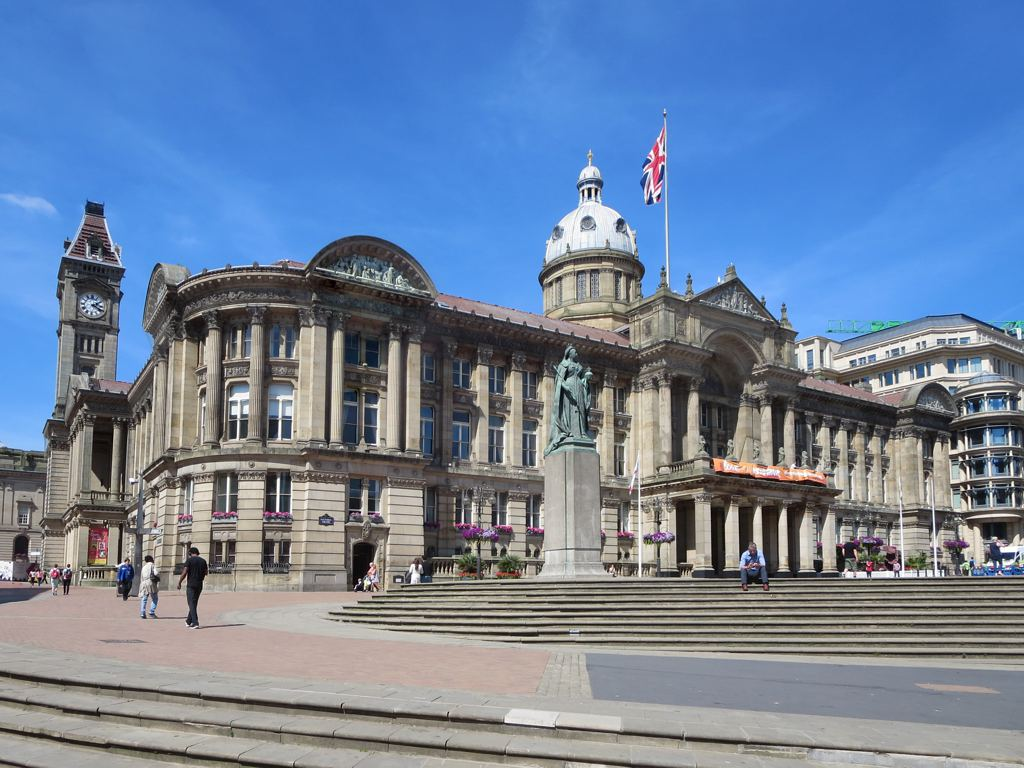
- Council House, Victoria Square, Birmingham, B1 1BB

Website
- www.birmingham.gov.uk

Constitution
- www.birmingham.gov.uk/constitution/

Birmingham City Council is the local authority for the city of Birmingham in the West Midlands, England. Birmingham has had an elected local authority since 1838, which has been reformed several times. Since 1974 the council has been a metropolitan borough council, a type of unitary authority. It provides the majority of local government services in the city. It is the most populous local government district in England, serving over 1.1 million people. The council has been a member of the West Midlands Combined Authority since 2016. It is based at the Council House on Victoria Square, Birmingham.

The council has been under no overall control since the May 2026 election, with Reform UK and the Green Party being the largest party. After that election, a minority coalition of the Liberal Democrats, Green Party and some of the independent councillors formed to run the council, with Liberal Democrat councillor Roger Harmer serving as leader of the council.

On 6 September 2023, the council declared effective bankruptcy, and central government commissioners were subsequently appointed to run the council under emergency measures.

== History ==
Until the 18th century, Birmingham was governed by manorial courts and its parish vestry. A body of improvement commissioners called the Birmingham Street Commissioners was established in 1769 to provide services in the rapidly growing town. Birmingham was incorporated as a municipal borough in 1838, after which it was governed by a body formally called 'the mayor, aldermen and burgesses of the borough of Birmingham', generally known as the corporation or town council. William Scholefield became the first mayor and William Redfern was the first town clerk. The corporation absorbed the functions of the street commissioners in 1852.

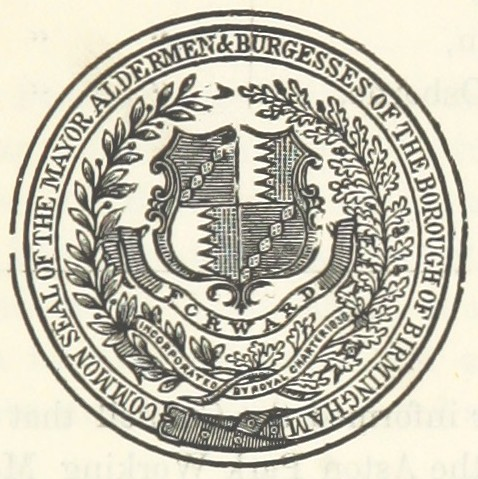
Common seal of the Mayor, Aldermen and Burgesses of the Borough of Birmingham, used 1838–1889

Birmingham was granted city status on 14 January 1889, after which the corporation was also known as the city council. When elected county councils were established in April 1889, Birmingham was considered large enough for its existing council to provide county-level services, and so it was made a county borough, independent from the new Warwickshire County Council, whilst remaining part of the geographical county of Warwickshire. The dignity of a lord mayor was conferred in 1896, with James Smith being appointed the first Lord Mayor of Birmingham.

The city boundaries have been enlarged many times. Notable expansions were in 1891 (Balsall Heath, Harborne, Saltley and Little Bromwich), 1909 (Quinton), 1911 (Aston Manor, Erdington, Handsworth, Kings Norton, Northfield and Yardley), 1928 (Perry Barr), 1931 (Sheldon and parts of other parishes), and 1974 (Sutton Coldfield). In 1995, New Frankley and the Kitwell Estate were transferred into the city from the parish of Frankley in Bromsgrove District.

The county borough was abolished in 1974 under the Local Government Act 1972, being replaced by a metropolitan district of Birmingham, covering the area of the old county borough plus the borough of Sutton Coldfield. The new district was one of seven metropolitan districts within the new metropolitan county of the West Midlands. Birmingham's borough and city statuses and its lord mayoralty passed to the new district and its council.

From 1974 until 1986 the council was a lower-tier authority, with upper-tier functions provided by the West Midlands County Council. The county council was abolished in 1986 and its functions passed to the county's seven borough councils, including Birmingham City Council, with some services provided through joint committees.

Since 2016 the council has been a member of the West Midlands Combined Authority, which has been led by the directly elected Mayor of the West Midlands since 2017. The combined authority provides strategic leadership and co-ordination for certain functions across the county, but Birmingham City Council continues to be responsible for most local government functions.

=== Women and minorities ===
Ellen Pinsent. This photograph was used in her 1911 election campaign.

The first woman elected to the council, on 1 November 1911, was Ellen Pinsent. She represented the Edgbaston Ward as a Liberal Unionist. She had earlier been co-opted as a member of the council's Education Committee and served as Chairman of the Special School Sub-Committee. She stood down from the council in October 1913 upon appointment as Commissioner for the Board of Control for Lunacy and Mental Deficiency.

Pinsent's time on the council overlapped with that of Margaret Frances Pugh, who was elected on 22 November 1911 to serve in the North Erdington ward. She resigned in November 1913.

Birmingham's third woman councillor, Clara Martineau, was elected on 14 October 1913 in the Edgbaston ward, and served until 1932, when she died, aged 57. Her father was former Mayor Sir Thomas Martineau, Lord Mayor Ernest Martineau was her brother, and Alderman Sir George Kenrick was her uncle.

Mary Cottrell became the first female Labour councillor in February 1917, when she was elected unopposed to the Selly Oak ward. The first female Lord Mayor, Marjorie Brown, held the post from 1973 to 1974. Theresa Stewart became the first female leader in October 1993, until 1999; and Lin Homer the first female chief executive, was in post from 2002 until 2005.

Bert Carless, a migrant from Jamaica, was elected the City's first non-white councillor in 1979. He was later made an Honorary Alderman.

=== 2023 section 114 finances notice ===
On 5 September 2023, Birmingham City Council issued a section 114 notice, being the local government equivalent of bankruptcy, stopping all future spending with the exception of money for statutory services, including the protection of vulnerable people. The leader of the Labour authority stated that the notice was a necessary step to get Birmingham back into a sound financial footing. The government subsequently appointed commissioners to oversee the running of the council under emergency measures. The bankruptcy has been ascribed to equal pay liabilities plus a disastrous implementation of an Oracle ERP system.

When the council issued the section 114 notice, it had forecast the reserves would go into a nominal £677.9 million deficit, but when the 2022-2024 accounts were published in July 2025 they showed the reserves had been £784.7 million in credit, more that £1 billion better than forecast. Independent accountants said the forecast had been "based on unaudited and materially incorrect information", and a group of 34 experts in accounting, finance and local government called for a public inquiry to investigate the section 114 notice decision.

As of 3 February 2026, Birmingham City Council is no longer effectively bankrupt, though The Guardian reported the negative effect of the period, which includes raising council tax by 17.5% over two years, cutting services previously provided by the council, and sales of council-owned assets bringing in £750 million. As of February 2026, the council is planning more spending and investment in services.

=== 2025 bin strike ===
On 11 March 2025, Members of the Unite union went out on strike due to a long-running dispute over the role of waste recycling and collection officer (WRCO) position being removed. The union claims the move will leave about 150 members £8,000 worse off. Birmingham City Council declared a major incident on 31 March 2025, saying the "regrettable" move was taken in response to public health concerns, as picket lines were blocking depots and preventing waste vehicles from collecting rubbish.

== Governance ==
Birmingham City Council provides metropolitan borough services. Some strategic functions in the area are provided by the West Midlands Combined Authority; the leader and deputy leader of the city council sit on the board of the combined authority as Birmingham's representatives. There are two civil parishes in the city at Sutton Coldfield and New Frankley in Birmingham, which form an additional tier of local government for their areas; the rest of the city is unparished.

=== Political control ===
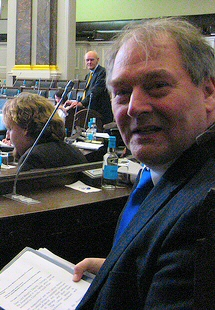
Mike Whitby, leader of the council from June 2004 to May 2012

Albert Bore, leader of the council from May 1999 to May 2004 and again from May 2012 to December 2015

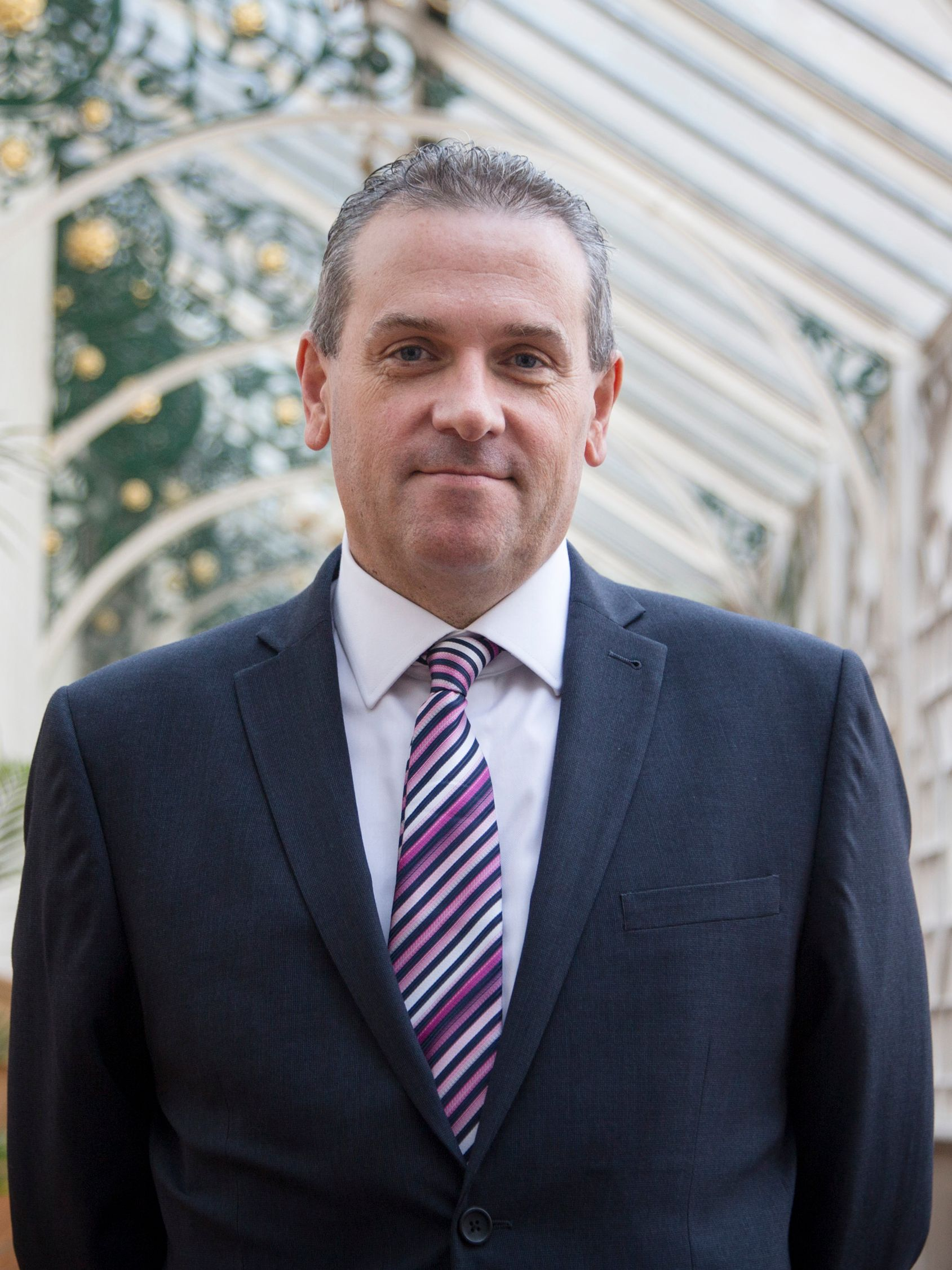
John Clancy, leader of the council December 2015 to September 2017, seen in the Council House's 'Crystal Gallery'

The council was under Labour majority control from 2012 to May 2026. After the election of that month, the council was left with no party in overall control, and it was not until 5 June that a coalition of Green, Liberal Democrat and Independent councillors were able to form a minority administration, led by Roger Harmer, the council's first ever Liberal Democrat leader.

Political control of the council since the 1974 reforms has been as follows:

Party in control	Years
Labour	1974–1975
No overall control	1975–1976
Conservative	1976–1979
No overall control	1979–1980
Labour	1980–1982
Conservative	1982–1984
Labour	1984–2003
No overall control	2003–2012
Labour	2012–2026
No overall control	2026–present

=== Leadership ===
The role of Lord Mayor of Birmingham is largely ceremonial. Political leadership is instead provided by the leader of the council. The first leader of the council after the 1974 reforms, Clive Wilkinson, had been the leader of the old corporation since December 1973. The leaders since 1973 have been:

Councillor	Party	From	To
Clive Wilkinson	Labour	Dec 1973	May 1976
Neville Bosworth	Conservative	May 1976	May 1980
Clive Wilkinson	Labour	May 1980	May 1982
Neville Bosworth	Conservative	May 1982	May 1984
Dick Knowles	Labour	May 1984	5 Oct 1993
Theresa Stewart	Labour	5 Oct 1993	May 1999
Albert Bore	Labour	18 May 1999	Jun 2004
Mike Whitby	Conservative	Jun 2004	May 2012
Albert Bore	Labour	22 May 2012	1 Dec 2015
John Clancy	Labour	1 Dec 2015	11 Sep 2017
Ian Ward	Labour	7 Nov 2017	23 May 2023
John Cotton	Labour	23 May 2023	May 2026
Roger Harmer	Liberal Democrats	5 June 2026	incumbent

=== Composition ===
==== At time of 2026 election ====
Following the 2026 election, the composition of the council was:

Party	Councillors
Reform	23
Green	19
Labour	17
Conservative	16
Liberal Democrats	12
Independent	13
Workers Party	1
Total	101

==== Changes since the 2026 election ====
- Rebecca Waters from Rubery and Rednal ward was suspended from the Birmingham Reform UK group following her voting for Roger Harmer to become the Leader of the Council.
- Diane Donaldson from Bromford and Hodge Hill ward resigned from the Labour Party on Sunday 7 June 2026 and sits as an independent.
- Majid Mahmood from Bromford and Hodge Hill ward resigned from the Labour Party on 12 June 2026 and sits as an independent.
- Bushra Bi defected from Labour to Green.
- Siobhan Harper-Nunes from Ladywood ward was suspended from the Green Party after 5 charges of assault.
- Alan Feeney resigns from Reform and from the council.

== Elections ==
Since the last boundary changes in 2018, the council has comprised 101 councillors representing 69 wards, with each ward electing one or two councillors. Elections are held every four years.

=== Wards and councillors ===
The wards and councillors are:

Ward	Councillor	Party	Council Service
Acocks Green	Roger Harmer	Liberal Democrats	1995–2001, 2008–2012, 2014–
Acocks Green	Penny Wagg	Liberal Democrats	2003–2011, 2022–
Allens Cross	Eddie Freeman	Reform	2026–
Alum Rock	Nosheen Khalid	Independent	2026-
Alum Rock	Shaukat Mahmood	Independent	2026-
Aston	Abdul Choudhury Shumon	Independent	2026-
Aston	Mumtaz Hussain	Liberal Democrats	2022–
Balsall Heath West	Duncan Ali	Green	2026-
Bartley Green	Chris Steele	Reform	2026-
Bartley Green	Rajbir Singh	Reform	2026-
Billesley	Chris Garghan	Green	2026-
Billesley	Joe Peacock	Green	2026-
Birchfield	Arshid Mahmood	Labour	2026-
Bordesley and Highgate	Ali Kazi	Green	2026-
Bordesley Green	Adnan Hussain	Independent	2026-
Bournbrook and Selly Park	Jane Baston	Green	2026-
Bournbrook and Selly Park	Corinne Fowler	Green	2026-
Bournville and Cotteridge	Roxanne Green	Green	2026–
Bournville and Cotteridge	Nicky Brennan	Labour	2018–
Brandwood and King's Heath	Jordan Phillip	Green	2026-
Brandwood and King's Heath	Hamzah Sheikh	Green	2026-
Bromford and Hodge Hill	Diane Donaldson	Independent (Note: Originally elected as Labour, resigned to become independent in June 2026.)	2016–
Bromford and Hodge Hill	Majid Mahmood	Labour	2011–
Castle Vale	Ray Goodwin	Labour	2022–
Druids Heath and Monyhull	Julien Pritchard	Green	2018–
Edgbaston	Deirdre Alden	Conservative	1999–
Edgbaston	Matt Bennett	Conservative	2008–2012, 2015–
Erdington	Robert Alden	Conservative	2006–
Erdington	Gareth Moore	Conservative	2011–
Frankley Great Park	Gemma Louise Guttridge	Reform	2026-
Garretts Green	Saddak Miah	Labour	2018–
Glebe Farm and Tile Cross	Jessica Ankrett	Reform	2026-
Glebe Farm and Tile Cross	Shehryay Kayani	Workers Party	2026-
Gravelly Hill	Mick Brown	Labour	2012–
Hall Green North	Mansoor Qureshi	Green	2026-
Hall Green North	Haroon Salim	Green	2026-
Hall Green South	Timothy Huxtable	Conservative	2002–
Handsworth	Ed Freshwater	Green	2026-
Handsworth Wood	Narinder Kaur Kooner	Labour	2026–
Handsworth Wood	Randeep Kaur Kular	Labour	2026-
Harborne	Martin Brooks	Independent (Note: Originally elected as Labour, administratively suspended in September 2024.)	1982–1999, 2022–
Harborne	Kevin Carmody	Green	2026-
Heartlands	Shafique Shah	Labour	2005–
Highter's Heath	Adam Higgs	Conservative	2018–
Holyhead	Rinkal Shergill	Independent (Note: Originally elected as Labour, resigned to become independent in October 2025.)	2022–
King's Norton North	Martin Derek Smith	Reform	2026-
King's Norton South	Robert Grant	Green	2026-
Kingstanding	John Lambert	Reform	2026-
Kingstanding	Jex Parkin	Reform	2026-
Ladywood	Siobhan Harper-Nunes	Green	2026-
Ladywood	Raheem Humphreys	Green	2026-
Longbridge and West Heath	Charles Latchford	Reform	2026-
Longbridge and West Heath	Anthony Ward	Reform	2026-
Lozells	Taj Uddin	Independent	2026–
Moseley	Izzy Knowles	Liberal Democrats	2022–
Moseley	Philip Mills	Liberal Democrats	2025–
Nechells	Mansuur Ahmed	Independent	2026-
Newtown	Rasheda Begum	Labour	2006–
North Edgbaston	Marcus Bernasconi	Labour	2022–
North Edgbaston	Sarina Younas	Labour	2026–
Northfield	George Hall	Reform	2026-
Oscott	Graham Green	Reform	2026-
Oscott	Martin McAuley	Reform	2026-
Perry Barr	James Hinton	Liberal Democrats	2026-
Perry Barr	Jan Morriam	Liberal Democrats	2017–
Perry Common	Sue Willetts	Reform	2026-
Pype Hayes	Danny Brian Carter	Reform	2026-
Quinton	Sam Forsyth	Independent	2022–
Quinton	Nagu Penakacherla	Reform	2026-
Rubery and Rednal	Rebecca Waters	Reform (Note: Originally elected as Reform, removed from the group following her voting in favour of the Lib Dem-Green-Independent coalition on 5 June 2026.)	2026-
Shard End	Alan Feeney	Independent	2026-
Sheldon	Darren Colling	Reform	2026-
Sheldon	Rachel Conaghan	Reform	2026-
Small Heath	Shaukat Ali Khan	Liberal Democrats	2026-
Small Heath	Mohammed Saeed	Liberal Democrats	2026-
Soho and Jewellery Quarter	Shuranjeet Singh	Labour	2026-
Soho and Jewellery Quarter	Su Brooks	Labour	2026-
South Yardley	Zaker Choudhry	Liberal Democrats	2006–2010, 2014–
Sparkbrook and Balsall Heath East	Jamil Khan	Independent	2026-
Sparkbrook and Balsall Heath East	Raihaan Abbas	Independent	2026-
Sparkhill	Rashad Mahmood	Labour	2022–
Sparkhill	Bushra Bi	Green	2022-
Stirchley	Kamel Hawwash	Green	2026-
Stockland Green	Amar Khan	Independent (Note: Originally elected as Labour, resigned to become independent in October 2025.)	2022–
Stockland Green	Manni Butt	Reform	2026-
Sutton Four Oaks	Raaj Shamji	Conservative	2026-
Sutton Mere Green	Meirion Jenkins	Conservative	2012–
Sutton Reddicap	Richard Parkin	Conservative	2022–
Sutton Roughley	Harmendra Parmar	Conservative	2026-
Sutton Trinity	David Pears	Conservative	1987–1991, 1992–1996, 2004–
Sutton Vesey	John Cooper	Conservative	2026-
Sutton Vesey	Anja Pawson	Conservative	2026-
Sutton Walmley and Minworth	John Perks	Conservative	2026-
Sutton Walmley and Minworth	Ken Wood	Conservative	2008–2012, 2014–
Sutton Wylde Green	Alex Yip	Conservative	2015–
Tyseley and Hay Mills	Atikur Rahman	Green	2026-
Ward End	Harris Khaliq	Independent	2026-
Weoley and Selly Oak	Glyn Marston	Reform	2026-
Weoley and Selly Oak	Cherie Waddingham	Reform	2026-
Yardley East	Deborah Harries	Liberal Democrats	2021–
Yardley West and Stechford	Baber Baz	Liberal Democrats	2018–

== Premises ==
The council meets and has some offices at the Council House on Victoria Square in the city centre. The building was first completed in 1879 for the old borough council and has been extended several times since. The council has several other office buildings, notably at 10 Woodcock Street, completed in 2011. There are two customer services centres, at 67 Sutton New Road in Erdington and at 1a Vineyard Road in Northfield. The possible closure and sale of some of the council's buildings is being considered as part of addressing the council's financial difficulties following the issuing of the Section 114 notice in 2023.

== Chief executives ==
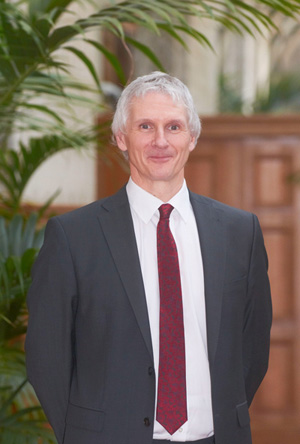
Mark Rogers in 2014

Past chief executives have included:

- 1994–2001: Sir Michael Lyons
- 2002–2005: Lin Homer
- 2005–2014: Stephen Hughes
- 2014–2017: Mark Rogers
- 2017–2017: Angela Probert (Acting)
- 2017–2018: Stella Manzie (Interim)
- 2018–2019: Dawn Baxendale
- 2019–2020: Clive Heaphy (Acting)
- 2020–2020: Chris Naylor (Interim)
- 2021–2024: Deborah Cadman
- 2024–2024: Graeme Betts (Acting)
- 2024: Joanne Roney (as "Managing Director")

== Services and facilities ==
Notable services provided and facilities managed by Birmingham City Council include:

- Library of Birmingham
- Public Library and Baths, Balsall Heath
- Birmingham Wholesale Markets
- Cemeteries
  - Brandwood End Cemetery
  - Handsworth Cemetery
  - Lodge Hill Cemetery
  - Witton Cemetery
- Council House
- Hall of Memory
- Parks
  - Brookvale Park
  - Calthorpe Park
  - Handsworth Park
  - Kings Heath Park
  - Swanshurst Park
  - Several country parks

The city's museums were transferred to the independent Birmingham Museums Trust in 2012. The council sold its Ogwen Cottage Outdoor Pursuits Centre, by auction, in October 2014.

=== Highways ===
In 2010, Birmingham City Council agreed a 25 year deal with Amey plc to manage the city's highways, but, after allegations of sub-standard repairs to roads and pavements, the council invoked penalty clauses and entered into a prolonged legal dispute. In December 2018, Amey parent Ferrovial put the business up for sale, after allocating €237m for losses on Amey's highway maintenance contract with the Council. In February 2019, Amey was close to a deal to exit its Birmingham contract, liabilities from which were preventing the company's sale by Ferrovial. A £215m deal to terminate Amey's Birmingham contract was confirmed in July 2019. The council was set to receive £160m in 2019 with a further £55m paid over the next six years, with services continuing on an interim basis until September 2019, and potentially until March 2020. However, in February 2020, it was announced the Birmingham contract would end in March 2020; Kier Group was appointed as interim contractor for 15 months while the council sought a permanent replacement for Amey. In February 2022, the city council formally began the process of identifying a contractor to deliver £2.7 billion of works over 12 years, and invited Kier and Canadian firm SNC-Lavalin to tender for the city’s restructured highways PFI contract, covering more than 2,500km of road and 5,000km of footway. However, in October 2023, the council claimed the government was preparing to "pull the plug" on £600m of highways funding. Kier were awarded the restructured contract, set to start in February 2024, but the deal was subject to government approval. The Department for Transport pulled support for the restructured business case, forcing the council to switch to a fully publicly funded model, and in November 2025, the Council invited bids on a new deal to deliver highways and infrastructure worth around £1bn over eight year across the city and wider Midlands.

== See also ==
- Government of Birmingham
- Birmingham City Council elections
- Birmingham Baths Committee
- Redevelopment of Birmingham
- City Architect of Birmingham
