= Swanshurst Park =

Public park in Birmingham, England

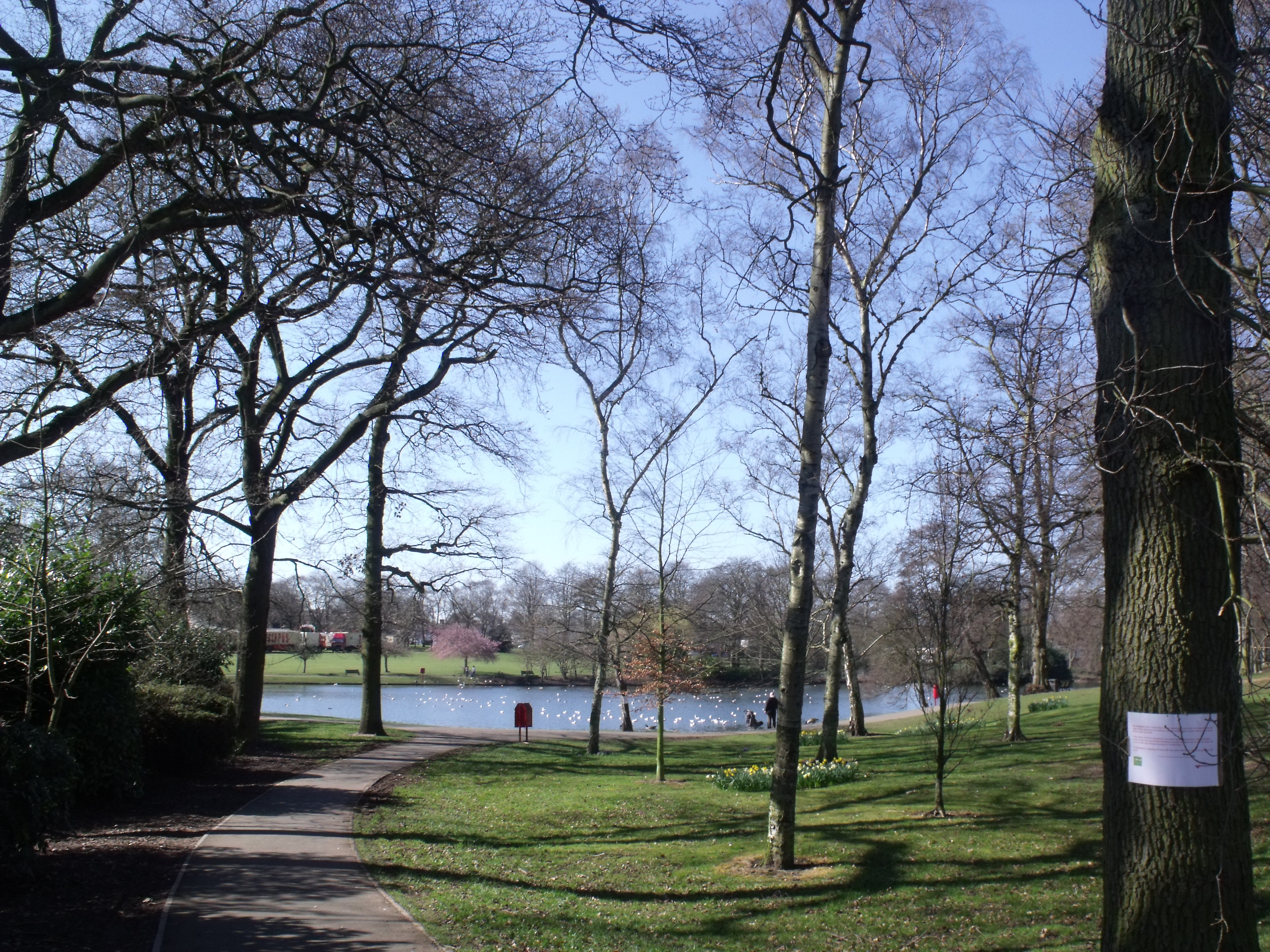
- Swanshurst Park from near the Swanshurst Lane entrance
- Interactive map of Swanshurst Park
- Type: Public park
- Location: Between Moseley and Billesley, Birmingham, England
- Coordinates: 52.431747°N 1.865877°W
- Created: 1922
- Operator: Birmingham City Council
- Website: Swanshurst Park

Swanshurst Park is a public park in Birmingham, England, that is managed by Birmingham City Council.

== Geography ==
The park is between Moseley and Billesley in Birmingham, England. In Moseley to the north it's on Swanshurst Lane. Between Moseley and Billesley along the Yardley Wood Road. To the south in Billesley near the fire station it is near Brook Lane. To the north west is Moseley New Pool where canada geese, swans, mallard ducks, and other bird species can be seen. It has also been known by other names: Swanshurst Pool, Grove Pool, and Swanshurst Slade Pool. It was made in c. 1759 by Henry Giles as a fishing pond.

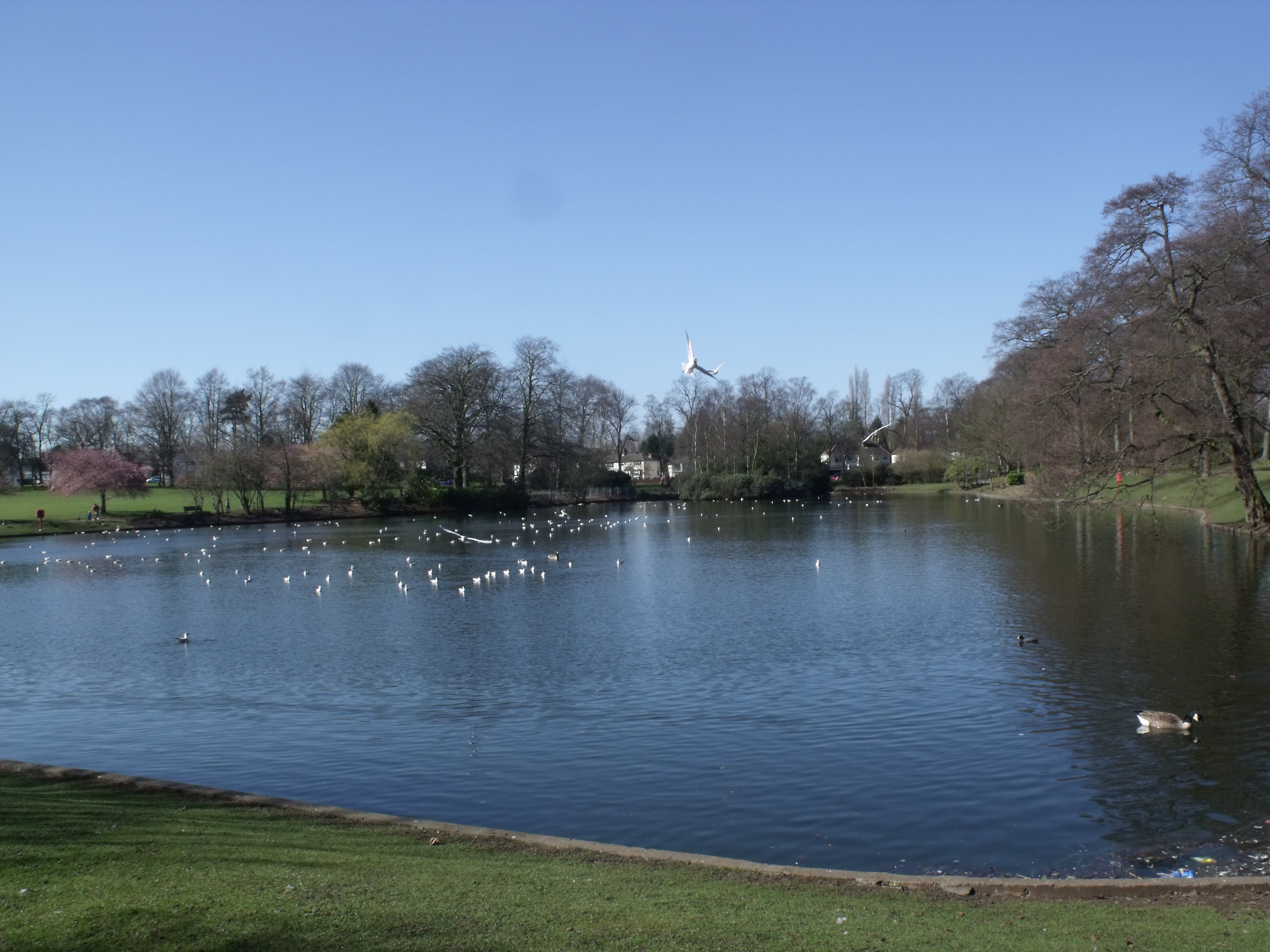
Moseley New Pool in March 2011

== History ==
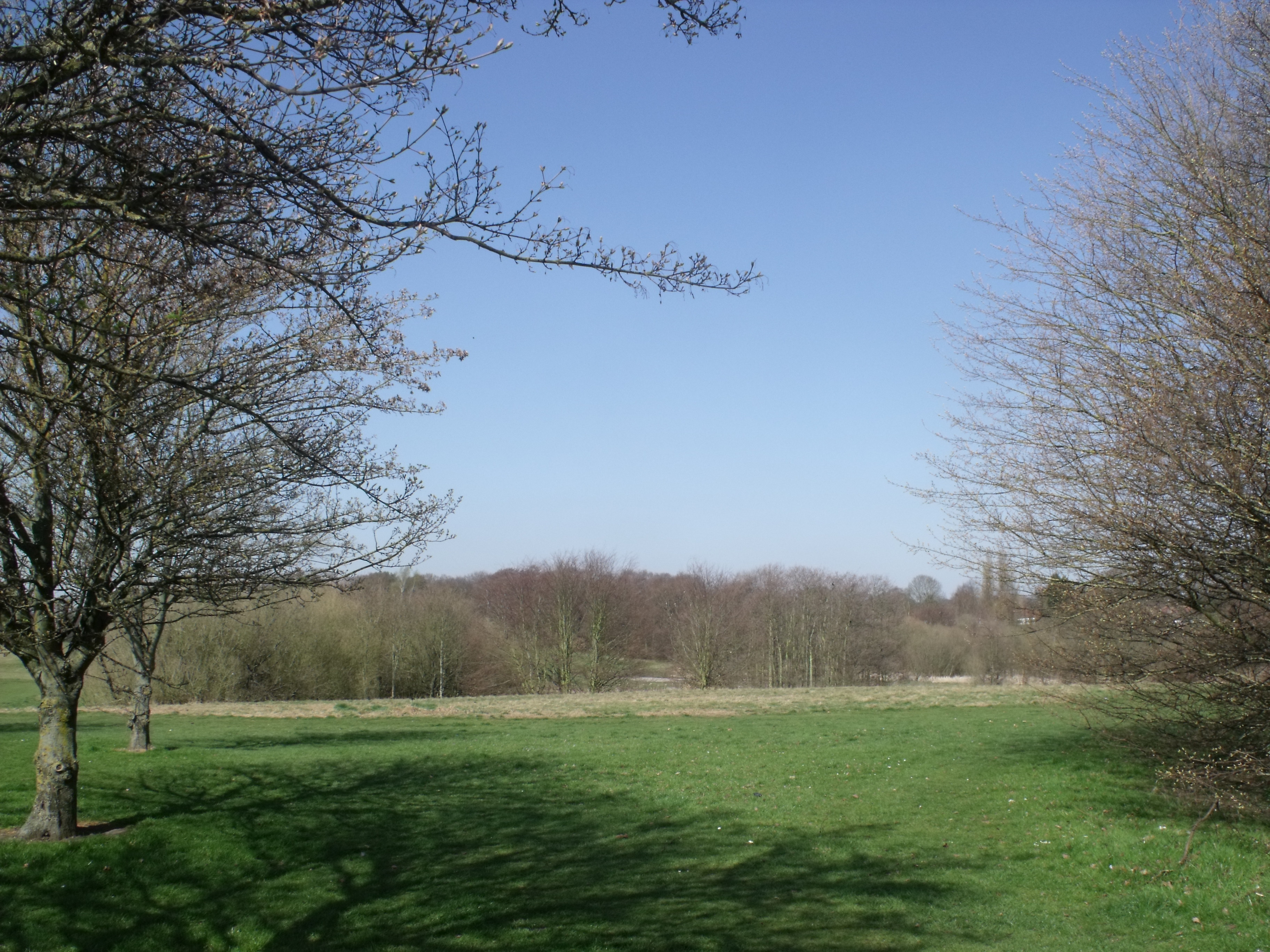
Swanshurst Park seen from Brook Lane in Billesley in March 2012

The council bought the fields in 1922 to lay out the park. They were from Ivyhouse Farm and Swanshurst Pool. The land was used as common grazing land until the end of World War II. A 9-hole pitch was put in during the 1950s; it was closed in the 1990s.
