= Dick Knowles =

British Labour politician (1917–2008)

Sir Richard “Dick” Knowles

Leader of Birmingham City Council
- In office May 1984 – October 1993
- Preceded by: Neville Bosworth
- Succeeded by: Theresa Stewart

Member of Birmingham City Council
- In office 1972–2000

Member of West Midlands County Council
- In office 1973–1977

Personal details
- Born: Richard Marchant Knowles; 20 May 1917
- Died: 18 February 2008 (aged 90)
- Party: Labour
- Known for: Leader of Birmingham City Council

Sir Richard Marchant Knowles (20 May 1917 – 18 February 2008) was a British politician known for his work in local government in Birmingham. He led the Labour Party administration on Birmingham City Council from 1984 to 1993.

Knowles was brought up in Kent and worked in the building industry from the age of 14. After brief service in the Royal Engineers during World War II, he became a builder and shipbuilder in 1941. In 1950 he became a trade union organiser in the building trade, working in Sevenoaks, Dover, Leeds and eventually ending up in Birmingham.

From 1971, he became national organiser of the Co-operative Party and began to consider a career in local government. He was elected to Birmingham City Council in 1972 and was swiftly made Chairman of the Planning Committee. In 1974 he was elected as an Alderman and moved on to the Policy Committee, of which he was a member for three years until the Labour Party lost power. He also served on West Midlands County Council from 1973 to 1977.

In 1980, Knowles returned as Planning Committee chairman for two years. He was promoted to be Labour group leader and became Leader of the Council in 1984 when Labour won control.

Knowles played a key role in the transformation of Birmingham city centre during the late 1980s and early 1990s. He was influential in bringing about the International Convention Centre and Symphony Hall on Broad Street, which were to prove hugely important in the regeneration and reinvention of the city.

He was knighted in 1989. Knowles was sued in 1990 by John Hemming over a leaflet which Hemming considered libellous; although Knowles had not written the leaflet, he had helped distribute it door-to-door. Lacking the resources to defend the case, Knowles agreed to pay damages of £1,000 to charity plus Hemming's legal costs.

Knowles stood down from the leadership in 1993, being succeeded by Theresa Stewart and was made Lord Mayor of Birmingham in 1994. He was defeated for re-election to the council in 2000.

On 2 May 2007, the then British Prime Minister, Tony Blair, paid tribute to Dick Knowles's contribution to the regeneration of Birmingham, during Prime Minister's Questions at Westminster.

He was still politically active as a governor of University Hospital Birmingham NHS Foundation Trust well into his eighties.

== Death and legacy ==
Knowles died of bladder cancer, aged 90. His son, Bill Knowles, added that his father had lived "a very full and complete life".

The Knowles stand, one of four stands for spectators at Alexander Stadium is named after him.

Political offices
Preceded by Neville Bosworth	Leader of Birmingham City Council; 1984 to 1993	Succeeded by Theresa Stewart
