= Neville Bosworth =

British Conservative politician (1918-2012

Sir Neville Bosworth CBE QC

Leader of Birmingham City Council
- In office May 1976 – May 1980
- Preceded by: Clive Wilkinson
- Succeeded by: Clive Wilkinson
- In office May 1982 – May 1984
- Preceded by: Clive Wilkinson
- Succeeded by: Dick Knowles

Member of Birmingham City Council for Erdington
- In office 1950–1996

Personal details
- Born: Neville Bruce Alfred Bosworth; 18 April 1918 Birmingham, England
- Died: 25 December 2012 (aged 94)
- Party: Conservative
- Spouse: Charlotte Davies (m. 1945)

Sir Neville Bruce Alfred Bosworth CBE QC (18 April 1918 – 25 December 2012) was a British Conservative politician. He served as leader of Birmingham City Council from 1976 to 1980 and 1982 to 1984, Lord Mayor of the city from 1969 to 1970, and director of Birmingham City FC.

== Early life ==
Bosworth was born on 18 April 1918 in Birmingham, England. He was educated at King Edward VI Aston School a selective Grammar School. He went on to study law at the University of Birmingham, graduating with a Bachelor of Laws (LLB) degree.

== Political career ==
Bosworth was elected as a councillor for Erdington in 1950. He served as a councillor for 46 years.

== Personal life ==
In 1945, Bosworth married Charlotte Marian Davis. Together they had a son and two daughters; Simon, Jane and Jo. His wife died in 2003.

== Honours ==
Bosworth was appointed a Commander of the Order of the British Empire (CBE) in the 1982 Birthday Honours. In the 1987 Queen's Birthday Honours, it was announced that Bosworth was to become a Knight Bachelor "for political and public service". He was knighted by Queen Elizabeth II on 22 July 1987 at Buckingham Palace.

Political offices
Preceded by Clive Wilkinson	Leader of Birmingham City Council; 1976 to 1980	Succeeded by Clive Wilkinson
Preceded by Clive Wilkinson	Leader of Birmingham City Council; 1982 to 1984	Succeeded by Dick Knowles
