= Billesley, West Midlands =

Area of Birmingham, England

Coordinates: 52.422°N 1.859°W

Billesley
- Location within the West Midlands
- Population: 26,536 (2011 Ward)
  - Density: 3,649 per km^{2}
- OS grid reference: SP095805
- Metropolitan borough: Birmingham
- Metropolitan county: West Midlands
- Region: West Midlands
- Country: England
- Sovereign state: United Kingdom
- Post town: BIRMINGHAM
- Postcode district: B13/B14/B28
- Dialling code: 0121
- Police: West Midlands
- Fire: West Midlands
- Ambulance: West Midlands
- UK Parliament: Birmingham Selly Oak

Billesley is a suburb of Birmingham, England. It is in the parliamentary constituency of Birmingham Selly Oak, Birmingham, England. It is 4 miles (6 km) south east of the city centre and includes the area of Billesley itself as well as, parts of Moseley and Hall Green and much of Yardley Wood and a significant eastern portion of Kings Heath which includes one side of Wheelers Lane and Alcester Road South. It is contiguous with the Birmingham wards of Highter's Heath on the south-west, Brandwood and Kings Heath on the west, Moseley on the north and Hall Green South on the east. To the south-east is the Shirley West ward of Solihull.

The suburb of Billesley is the area bordered by Billesley Common, Chinn Brook Meadows, The Dingles and Swanshurst Park (although some streets within this area favour the broader B13 moniker of Moseley). The expansion of this area began in 1921 with the commencement of construction of the Billesley Estates. Two districts began to form within Billesley; one on the former Ivy House Farm (north of Trittiford Rd) and the other on the former Billesley Farm (south of Trittiford Rd). By 1926, between 15 and 20 families were moving into Billesley each week and it became one of Birmingham's first council estates. Billesley has many local community groups such as Friends of Billesley Commons.

== Etymology ==
The name derives from an Anglo-Saxon named Bill who established himself within the area. -Ley means "woodland clearing" and a woodland clearing is known to have existed in Billesley north of Chinn Brook.

== Demography ==
The 2001 population census found that 25,874 people were living in the area with a population density of 4,537 people per km^{2} compared with 3,649 people per km^{2} for Birmingham. Billesley has an area of 6.4 km^{2}/ 566.2 hectares. Females represented 52% of the population, compared with 51.6% for the whole of Birmingham.

Billesley is not an ethnically diverse area with ethnic minorities representing 12.3% (3,312) of the ward's population compared with 29.6% for Birmingham. 8.4% of the population was born outside of the United Kingdom, lower than the Birmingham average of 16.5% and slightly lower than the national average of 9.3%. 88.1% of the population was classed as being in the broad ethnic group of White. This is higher than the Birmingham average of 70.4% yet lower than the national average of 90.9%. The Asian ethnic group was the second largest in the ward at 6.2%, below the city average of 19.5% yet higher than the national average of 4.6%. More specifically, the White British ethnic group was the largest at 83.2% and the White Irish was the second largest at 4.2%. The predominant religion in the ward is Christianity, with 71.8% of the population of the ward identifying themselves as Christians. This is near to the national average of 71.9% however is greater than the city average of 59.1%. 13.8% stated that they had no religion and 7.8% did not answer the question.

27.6% of the population was noted to be in the 25-44 age group, below the Birmingham average of 28.3% and the national average of 29.3%. People of a pensionable age represented 19.3% of the ward's population, above that of 16.7% for the city. 57.2% of the population was of a working age, below the city average of 59.8%. 63% of the population had a job whilst 8.2% was unemployed, below the city average of 9.5% yet above the national average of 5%. Of the unemployed, 36.5% were in long term unemployment and 11.2% had never worked. 17.9% of those with a job, worked in the manufacturing sector. 17.1% worked in the Wholesale & Retail Trade, Vehicle Repairs sector. The largest employer for the ward is National Express West Midlands who employ approximately 460 people.

The majority of housing is either inter-war or post-war build. 99% of residents live in households whilst 1% live in communal establishments. There was a total of 10,514 households that were occupied resulting in an average of 2.4 people per house, equal to that of the national average. 63.8% of occupied houses were occupied by the owner, above the city average of 60.4%. 26.3% of occupied houses were rented from Birmingham City Council. 354 were stated as being vacant. The majority of the housing in the ward was stated as being semi-detached (42.9%) whilst terraced houses were the second most common (32.4%).

== Politics ==
Billesley is represented by two Green Party councillors on Birmingham city council: Chris Garghan and Joe Peacock, both elected in the 2026 local elections.

Billesley lies in the parliamentary constituency of Birmingham Selly Oak, and is represented by a Labour MP, Alistair Carns.
