= 2026 Birmingham City Council election =

2026 English local government election

- 7 May 2026

All 101 seats to Birmingham City Council 51 seats needed for a majority
- Registered: 762,675
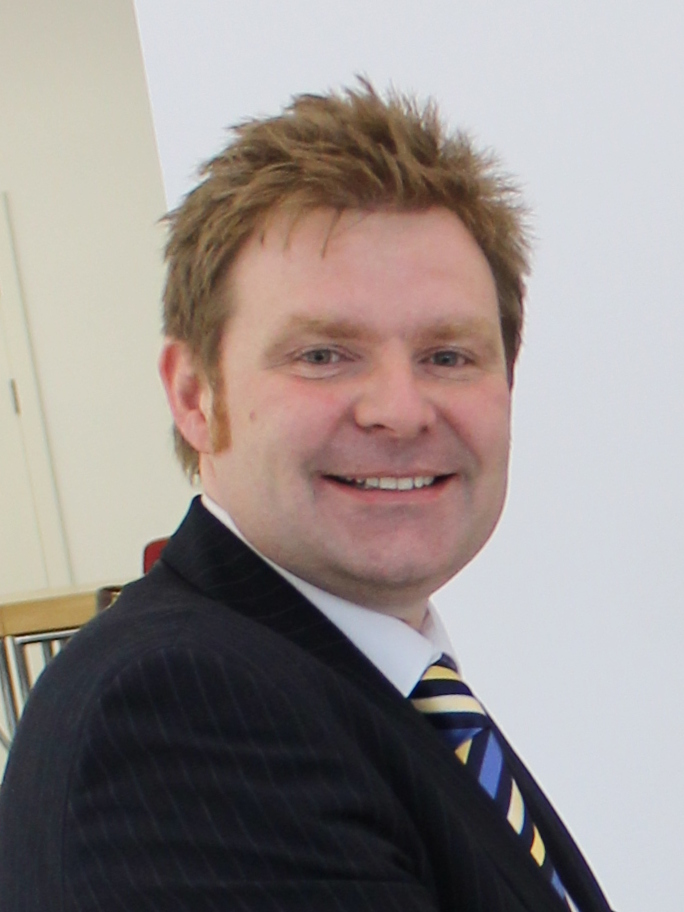

| | First party | Second party | Third party |
|---|---|---|---|
| Leader | Jex Parkin | Julien Pritchard | John Cotton |
| Party | Reform | Green | Labour |
| Leader's seat | Kingstanding | Druids Heath & Monyhull | Glebe Farm & Tile Cross (lost re-election) |
| Last election | 0 seats, 0.1% | 2 seats, 5.2% | 65 seats, 51.5% |
| Seats before | 0 | 2 | 51 (Note: Includes the vacant seats in Allens Cross and Lozells which were both last held by Labour.) |
| Seats won | 23 | 19 | 17 |
| Seat change | ▲23 | ▲17 | ▼48 |
| Popular vote | 87,441 | 92,794 | 91,071 |
| Percentage | 19.6% | 20.8% | 20.4% |
| Swing | ▲19.6pp | ▲15.6pp | ▼31.1pp |
| | Fourth party | Fifth party | Sixth party |
| Leader | Robert Alden | | Roger Harmer |
| Party | Conservative | Independent | Liberal Democrats |
| Leader's seat | Erdington | | Acocks Green |
| Last election | 22 seats, 27.5% | 0 seats, 0.2% | 12 seats, 14.8% |
| Seats before | 21 | 14 (Note: Of the 14 Independent councillors before the election, 8 sat in the Birmingham Independent Councillors group and 3 sat in the Harborne & Quinton Independents group and 3 stood as independents in the election against Labour and Conservatives respectively.) | 13 |
| Seats won | 16 | 13 | 12 |
| Seat change | ▼6 | ▲13 | Steady |
| Popular vote | 69,209 | 43,086 | 49,694 |
| Percentage | 15.5% | 9.7% | 11.1% |
| Swing | ▼12.0pp | ▲9.5pp | ▼3.7pp |
- Map of results, coloured by the winning party in each ward.
Leader before election
John Cotton
Labour
Leader after election
Roger Harmer
Liberal Democrat
No overall control (Note: Liberal Democrats, Green and independent minority coalition)

The 2026 Birmingham City Council election took place on 7 May 2026, with all 101 council seats up for election across 37 single-member and 32 two-member wards. The election was held alongside other local elections across Great Britain.

Prior to the election, the council was under Labour majority control. At the previous council election in 2022, Labour had maintained its control of the council, winning 65 seats. The Conservative Party formed the main opposition with twenty-two seats, with the Liberal Democrats on twelve and the Green Party winning two.

On 11 May 2026, the final results of this election were announced as Reform UK 23, Greens 19, Labour 17, Conservatives 16, Lib Dems 12, Workers Party 1, Independents 13. The council therefore went under no overall control. The incumbent Labour leader of the council, John Cotton, lost his seat.

Reform were the largest party after the election, but were unable to find any coalition partners to work with them. Instead, a coalition of the Liberal Democrats, Green Party and the Better Birmingham Independent Group formed a minority administration, led by the Liberal Democrats' group leader Roger Harmer. He was formally confirmed as the new leader of the council at a meeting on 5 June 2026.

== Background ==
The Local Government Act 1972 created a two-tier system of metropolitan counties and boroughs covering Greater Manchester, Merseyside, South Yorkshire, Tyne and Wear, the West Midlands, and West Yorkshire starting in 1974. Birmingham is a district of the West Midlands metropolitan county. The Local Government Act 1985 abolished the metropolitan county councils, with the metropolitan boroughs individually taking on most of the county-level powers. The West Midlands Combined Authority was created in 2016 and began electing the mayor of the West Midlands from 2017, which was given strategic powers covering a region coterminous with the West Midlands metropolitan county.

Since its formation Birmingham City Council has variously been under Labour control, Conservative control and no overall control. Councillors have predominantly been elected from the Labour Party, Conservative Party and the Liberal Democrats. The council has had an overall Labour majority since the 2012 council election, when they regained control from the Conservative-Liberal Democrat coalition that had run the city since 2004.

John Cotton had led the Labour group on Birmingham City Council since May 2023, with Robert Alden leading the Conservative group, Roger Harmer leading the Liberal Democrats, Julien Pritchard leading the Greens, Martin Brooks leading the Harborne and Quinton Independents, and Jane Jones leading the Birmingham Independents.

Dissatisfied with the Labour Party's position in the Gaza War, many Muslim candidates stood as independents, campaigning on pro-Gaza sentiments. Significant controversy erupted over the candidature of Shahid Butt, a British Muslim who had been convicted in a plot to bomb the British consulate, an Anglican Church and a Swiss-owned hotel in Yemen in 1999 at the Sparkhill council seat of Birmingham. Butt also courted controversy by calling Muslims to boycott Jews during his campaign.

== Council composition ==
=== Prior to the election ===
Birmingham City council has been controlled by the Labour Party since 2012. The Conservative Party last held sole control of the council in 1984. It was under no overall control from 2003 until 2012, run by a Labour-Liberal Democrat coalition from 2003 to 2004 and by a Conservative-Liberal Democrat coalition from 2004 to 2012.

| After 2022 election | | Before 2026 election | |
| Party | Seats | Party | Seats |
|---|---|---|---|
| Labour | 65 | Labour | 51 |
| Conservative | 22 | Conservative | 21 |
| Liberal Democrats | 12 | Liberal Democrats | 13 |
| Green | 2 | Green | 2 |
| Independent | 0 | Independent | 12 |
| Vacant | N/A | Vacant | 2 |

Changes 2022–2026:

- August 2022: Mohammed Azim (Labour) dies – by-election held October 2022
- October 2022: Saima Ahmed (Labour) wins by-election
- March 2024: Brigid Jones (Labour) resigns – by-election held May 2024
- April 2024: Rick Payne (Conservative) resigns – by-election held May 2024
- May 2024:
  - Jamie Scott (Labour) and Clifton Welch (Conservative) win by-elections
  - Alex Aitken (Labour) and Kirsten Kurt-Elli (Labour) resign – by-elections held July 2024
  - Ayoub Khan (Liberal Democrats) leaves party to sit as an independent
- July 2024: Carmel Corrigan (Labour) and Esther Rai (Labour) win by-elections
- September 2024: Shabina Bano (Labour) joins Liberal Democrats
- December 2024: Martin Brooks (Labour) leaves party to sit as an independent
- April 2025: Sam Forsyth (Labour) leaves party to sit as an independent
- July 2025: Kerry Jenkins (Labour) dies – by-election held October 2025
- August 2025: Barbara Dring (Labour) and Jane Jones (Labour) leave party to sit as independents
- October 2025:
  - Philip Mills (Liberal Democrats) gains by-election from Labour
  - Amar Khan (Labour), Mohammed Idrees (Labour), Chaman Lal (Labour), and Rinkal Shergill (Labour) leave party to sit as independents
- December 2025: Jack Deakin (Labour) resigns – seat left vacant until 2026 election
- January 2026: Waseem Zaffar (Labour) dies – seat left vacant until 2026 election
- April 2026: Hendrina Quinnen (Labour) joins the independent group

=== After the election ===
Although the Green Party of England and Wales won the highest share of the vote at 20.8%, Reform UK won more seats because of the UK's first-past-the-post electoral system.

Following the election, the leader of the Reform UK group of 23 new councillors stated that "Although we are the largest party, other groups have made it clear that they refuse to work with us, meaning there is no viable route for Reform to take control of the council. Given that Birmingham has also clearly elected a left-wing majority, we have accepted that we will unfortunately be unable to form an administration." The Labour Party named Nicky Brennan as its leader on the council. Brennan has since ruled out her party entering into any coalition agreement with other parties in the council.

Following the elections, cross-party talks formed to form a new administration. Despite emerging as the largest single group with 23 seats, Reform UK conceded that they had "no viable route" to take control of the council, with every party interested in a coalition explicitly ruling out a coalition with them, and the Labour and Conservative parties ruling out any coalitions. Meanwhile, the Labour Party, which saw its 14-year control of the council end after dropping to 17 seats, also ruled out entering any power-sharing arrangements, choosing instead to sit on the opposition benches.

By 11 May 2026, the possibility of a coalition emerged as the Green Party (19 seats) and the Liberal Democrats (12 seats) initiated formal talks to build a governing block. On 19 May, this alliance was strengthened by a newly-formed independent group, the "Better Birmingham Independents", a seven-seat bloc of moderate independent Muslim councillors led by Harris Khaliq, that had split away from the hard-line faction of the party loyal to Ahmed Yakoob and agreed to a coalition. This moderate group agreed to drop issues related to Gaza war and contentious social agendas from their manifesto. To secure a power-sharing deal with the progressive Greens and Liberal Democrats, they explicitly committed to upholding the council's statutory equality policies, including existing LGBTQ+ protections and not interfering with or challenging the national statutory curriculum surrounding LGBTQ taught in Birmingham schools, which has been an issue in the city and other areas in England with significant Muslim communities since 2019. This group is still seven seats short of a majority.

The election produced a significant shift in the gender balance on the council with the number of female councillors falling from 42 to 28 of the 101 council seats. Liberal Democrat councillor, Izzy Knowles, cited a rise in abuse of elected representatives, particularly towards women, as a factor deterring women from running for office.

== Summary ==
Council composition after the 2022 election

Council composition after the 2026 election

=== Election result ===
2026 Birmingham City Council election
| Party | Seats | Gains | Losses | Net gain/loss | Seats % | Votes % | Votes | +/− |
|---|---|---|---|---|---|---|---|---|
| Reform | 23 | 23 | 0 | ▲23 | 22.8% | 19.6% | 87,441 | +19.6pp |
| Green | 19 | 17 | 0 | ▲17 | 18.8% | 20.8% | 92,794 | +15.6pp |
| Labour | 17 | 0 | 48 | ▼48 | 16.8% | 20.4% | 91,071 | –31.1pp |
| Conservative | 16 | 2 | 8 | ▼6 | 15.8% | 15.5% | 69,209 | –12.0pp |
| Independent | 13 | 13 | 0 | ▲13 | 12.9% | 9.7% | 43,086 | +9.5pp |
| Liberal Democrats | 12 | 4 | 4 | Steady | 11.9% | 11.1% | 49,694 | –3.7pp |
| Workers Party | 1 | 1 | 0 | ▲1 | 1.0% | 2.0% | 8,783 | +1.8pp |
| Your Party | 0 | 0 | 0 | 0 | 0.0% | 0.8% | 3,543 | New |
| TUSC | 0 | 0 | 0 | Steady | 0.0% | 0.1% | 304 | -0.2pp |
| Total | 101 | | | | | | 445,925 | |

Vote Share
| Party | Seat share |
| Green | 18.8 |
| Labour | 16.8 |
| Reform UK | 22.8 |
| Conservative | 15.8 |
| Liberal Democrats | 11.9 |
| Independent | 12.9 |
| Workers Party | 1.0 |
| Your Party | 0.0 |
| TUSC | 0.0 |

| Before 2026 election | | After 2026 election | |
| Party | Seats | Party | Seats |
|---|---|---|---|
| Reform | 0 | Reform | 23 |
| Green | 2 | Green | 19 |
| Labour | 51 | Labour | 17 |
| Conservative | 21 | Conservative | 16 |
| Liberal Democrats | 13 | Liberal Democrats | 12 |
| Workers Party | 0 | Workers Party | 1 |
| Independent | 12 | Independent | 13 |
| Vacant | 2 | Vacant | 0 |

== Ward results ==
=== Calculation of vote percentages ===
The vote percentage for each candidate is calculated by dividing their number of votes by the total number of valid ballots.

==== 1-seat wards ====
The calculation is straightforward for 1-seat wards since the total number of valid ballots is equal to the total number of votes cast.

==== 2-seat wards ====
In the case of 2-seat wards, the calculation is more complex because the number of valid ballots is not equal to the number of votes cast. Nor is it equal to half the number of votes cast because some valid ballots may have only one vote. Instead, we must determine the number of valid ballots by multiplying the percentage turnout by the eligible electorate of the ward and then subtracting the number of rejected ballots.

Unfortunately, Birmingham City Council has not published the numbers of rejected ballots for this election, so we cannot account for these. This means that the vote percentages for 2-seat wards are slightly understated.

=== Wards beginning A–G ===
==== Acocks Green ====
Acocks Green (2 seats)
| Party | Candidate | Votes | % | ±% |
|---|---|---|---|---|
| Liberal Democrats | Roger Kingdon Harmer | 1,952 | 36.4 | ▼15.2 |
| Liberal Democrats | Penny Wagg | 1,486 | 27.7 | ▼15.3 |
| Reform | Danny Drennan | 1,147 | 21.4 | New |
| Green | A C Baker | 1,106 | 20.6 | ▲14.6 |
| Green | Sadia Mahmood Khan | 1,053 | 19.7 | New |
| Reform | Doctor Sanjeev Mehta | 987 | 18.4 | New |
| Labour | John Anthony O'Shea | 813 | 15.2 | ▼23.7 |
| Labour | Lu O'Shea | 577 | 10.8 | ▼24.7 |
| Workers Party | Sajid Mehmood Bhatti | 239 | 4.5 | New |
| Workers Party | Mohammed Afzal Tahir | 203 | 3.8 | New |
| Conservative | Tristan Thomas Griffiths-Hughes | 192 | 3.6 | ▼3.1 |
| Conservative | Dhiran Patel | 179 | 3.3 | ▼2.2 |
| TUSC | Jae Robinson | 52 | 1.0 | New |
| TUSC | Eamonn Kevin Flynn | 37 | 0.7 | ▼1.2 |
| Majority | | 339 | 6.3 | |
| Turnout | | | 32.8 | |
| Registered electors | | 16,334 | | |
| Liberal Democrats hold | | Swing | | |
| Liberal Democrats hold | | Swing | | |

==== Allens Cross ====
Allens Cross
| Party | Candidate | Votes | % | ±% |
|---|---|---|---|---|
| Reform | Eddie Freeman | 949 | 34.3 | New |
| Independent | Paul Smith | 651 | 23.5 | New |
| Labour | Seb Lovell-Huckle | 451 | 16.3 | ▼29.6 |
| Green | Daniel Rust | 381 | 13.8 | ▲8.2 |
| Conservative | Theo Wicking | 259 | 9.4 | ▼35.8 |
| Liberal Democrats | Emil-Crisan Toescu | 76 | 2.7 | ▼0.4 |
| Majority | | 298 | 10.8 | |
| Turnout | | | 37.65 | |
| Registered electors | | 7,317 | | |
| Reform gain from Labour | | Swing | | |

==== Alum Rock ====
Alum Rock (2 seats)
| Party | Candidate | Votes | % | ±% |
|---|---|---|---|---|
| Independent | Nosheen Khalid | 3,307 | 48.7 | New |
| Independent | Shaukat Mahmood | 3,266 | 48.1 | New |
| Labour | Ansar Ali Khan | 2,424 | 35.7 | ▼42.3 |
| Labour | Mariam Khan | 2,223 | 32.7 | ▼38.8 |
| Green | Hussain Ahamad | 596 | 8.8 | New |
| Green | David Bloxham | 457 | 6.7 | New |
| Liberal Democrats | Asia Hussain | 301 | 4.4 | ▼11.2 |
| Liberal Democrats | Wajid Bashir Malhotra | 227 | 3.3 | ▼7.1 |
| Reform | Thomas Ian McPake | 126 | 1.9 | New |
| Reform | Karen Jayne Strangward | 114 | 1.7 | New |
| Conservative | Monica Catherine Hardie | 92 | 1.4 | ▼2.3 |
| Conservative | Barbara Wood | 65 | 1.0 | ▼2.6 |
| Majority | | 842 | 12.4 | |
| Turnout | | | 41.46 | |
| Registered electors | | 16,380 | | |
| Independent gain from Independent | | Swing | | |
| Independent gain from Labour | | Swing | | |

==== Aston ====
Aston (2 seats)
| Party | Candidate | Votes | % | ±% |
|---|---|---|---|---|
| Independent | Abdul Choudhury Shumon | 2,254 | 36.1 | New |
| Liberal Democrats | Mumtaz Hussain | 2,115 | 33.9 | ▼9.5 |
| Liberal Democrats | Saeed Ahmed | 1,610 | 25.8 | ▼25.6 |
| Labour | Mohammed Hanif | 1,505 | 24.1 | ▼17.9 |
| Labour | Zafar Ali | 1,161 | 18.6 | ▼19.3 |
| Independent | Ziaul Islam | 877 | 14.1 | New |
| Green | Claire Groom | 554 | 8.9 | New |
| Independent | Naib Hussain | 542 | 8.7 | New |
| Green | Carol Guest | 462 | 7.4 | New |
| Independent | Dorothy Elizabeth Gerald | 128 | 2.1 | New |
| Reform | Desmond Hayden Dobson | 111 | 1.8 | New |
| Reform | Adam Fitzgerald | 109 | 1.7 | New |
| Conservative | Damon Scott Shinnie | 98 | 1.6 | ▼2.1 |
| Conservative | Derek Desmond Harold Lambert | 95 | 1.5 | ▼1.5 |
| Majority | | 505 | 8.1 | |
| Turnout | | | 41.77 | |
| Registered electors | | 14,938 | | |
| Independent gain from Independent | | Swing | | |
| Liberal Democrats hold | | Swing | | |

==== Balsall Heath West ====
Balsall Heath West
| Party | Candidate | Votes | % | ±% |
|---|---|---|---|---|
| Green | Duncan Ali | 934 | 34.5 | ▲29.0 |
| Independent | Zhor Malik | 518 | 19.1 | New |
| Labour | Naz Rasheed | 464 | 17.1 | ▼34.7 |
| Independent | Raja Mohammed Amin | 438 | 16.2 | New |
| Reform | Michael Sidear Webb | 142 | 5.2 | New |
| Liberal Democrats | Farah Naz | 131 | 4.8 | ▼2.0 |
| Conservative | Guy Hordern | 80 | 3.0 | ▼29.0 |
| Majority | | 416 | 15.4 | |
| Turnout | | | 35.67 | |
| Registered electors | | 7,593 | | |
| Green gain from Labour | | Swing | | |

==== Bartley Green ====
Bartley Green (2 seats)
| Party | Candidate | Votes | % | ±% |
|---|---|---|---|---|
| Reform | Chris Steele | 1,938 | 36.7 | New |
| Reform | Rajbir Singh | 1,615 | 30.6 | New |
| Conservative | Kerry Brewer | 1,432 | 27.1 | ▼16.7 |
| Conservative | Bruce John Lines | 1,403 | 26.6 | ▼20.9 |
| Labour | Paul Simon Preston | 846 | 16.0 | ▼23.6 |
| Labour | Rachel Marie Preston | 836 | 15.8 | ▼26.7 |
| Green | Phillippa Treharne Jones | 824 | 15.6 | ▲8.8 |
| Green | Sean Lewis Venables | 687 | 13.0 | New |
| Liberal Democrats | Sheila Ann Kelly-Trow | 269 | 5.1 | ▲1.1 |
| Liberal Democrats | Anthony Wilkinson | 171 | 3.2 | ▼0.3 |
| Majority | | 183 | 3.5 | |
| Turnout | | | 33.7 | |
| Registered electors | | 15,672 | | |
| Reform gain from Conservative | | Swing | | |
| Reform gain from Conservative | | Swing | | |

==== Billesley ====
Billesley (2 seats)
| Party | Candidate | Votes | % | ±% |
|---|---|---|---|---|
| Green | Chris Garghan | 2,702 | 43.4 | ▲33.8 |
| Green | Joe Peacock | 2,649 | 42.5 | ▲37.0 |
| Reform | Clair Felton | 1,443 | 23.2 | New |
| Reform | Margaret McGarry | 1,408 | 22.6 | New |
| Labour | Katherine Elizabeth Iroh | 1,064 | 17.1 | ▼32.1 |
| Labour | Jess Roberts | 927 | 14.9 | ▼38.0 |
| Conservative | Sanjida Chishty | 552 | 8.9 | ▼23.3 |
| Conservative | Sulliman Khan | 484 | 7.8 | ▼23.2 |
| Workers Party | Mudassir Aftab | 260 | 4.2 | New |
| Workers Party | Raf Beg | 199 | 3.2 | New |
| Liberal Democrats | Sahibzada Abid Naeem | 167 | 2.7 | ▼4.2 |
| Liberal Democrats | Ian Neal | 164 | 2.6 | ▼1.9 |
| Majority | | 1,206 | 19.4 | |
| Turnout | | | 44 | |
| Registered electors | | 14,150 | | |
| Green gain from Labour | | Swing | | |
| Green gain from Labour | | Swing | | |

==== Birchfield ====
Birchfield
| Party | Candidate | Votes | % | ±% |
|---|---|---|---|---|
| Labour | Arshid Mahmood | 861 | 34.6 | ▼43.7 |
| Independent | Mohammed Yaseen | 790 | 31.8 | New |
| Green | Muhammad Yasir | 411 | 16.5 | New |
| Liberal Democrats | Christopher Anton | 201 | 8.1 | ▼0.9 |
| Reform | Barry Newton | 122 | 4.9 | New |
| Conservative | Glenton Easy | 102 | 4.1 | ▼7.8 |
| Majority | | 71 | 2.9 | |
| Turnout | | | 32 | |
| Registered electors | | 7,706 | | |
| Labour hold | | Swing | | |

==== Bordesley and Highgate ====
Bordesley and Highgate
| Party | Candidate | Votes | % | ±% |
|---|---|---|---|---|
| Green | Ali Akbar Shujja Kazi | 658 | 25.0 | ▲16.8 |
| Labour | Tyrone Reece Fowles | 564 | 21.5 | ▼35.8 |
| Independent | Gerry Moynihan | 294 | 11.2 | New |
| Independent | Mohammed Idrees | 270 | 10.3 | New |
| Reform | Alexander Ross Douglas Slater | 201 | 7.6 | New |
| Liberal Democrats | Waleed Obad | 192 | 7.3 | New |
| Independent | Mohammed Joynal Abedin | 173 | 6.6 | New |
| Conservative | Jamil Tuki | 165 | 6.3 | ▼13.0 |
| Independent | Hakil Ahmed | 112 | 4.3 | New |
| Majority | | 94 | 3.6 | |
| Turnout | | | 26.23 | |
| Registered electors | | 9,951 | | |
| Green gain from Labour | | Swing | | |

==== Bordesley Green ====
Bordesley Green
| Party | Candidate | Votes | % | ±% |
|---|---|---|---|---|
| Independent | Adnan Hussain | 773 | 30.8 | New |
| Labour | Raqeeb Aziz | 628 | 25.0 | ▼42.8 |
| Liberal Democrats | Mohammed Attiq | 375 | 14.9 | ▲0.8 |
| Green | Joe Ballard | 315 | 12.5 | New |
| Workers Party | Wajid Burkey | 295 | 11.7 | New |
| Reform | Paul Gerald Linden | 86 | 3.4 | New |
| Conservative | Charles Robert Jeynes | 40 | 1.6 | ▼16.5 |
| Majority | | 145 | 5.8 | |
| Turnout | | | 32.6 | |
| Registered electors | | 7,617 | | |
| Independent gain from Labour | | Swing | | |

==== Bournbrook and Selly Park ====
Bournbrook and Selly Park (2 seats)
| Party | Candidate | Votes | % | ±% |
|---|---|---|---|---|
| Green | Jane Louisa Baston | 2,584 | 66.0 | ▲47.7 |
| Green | Corinne Fowler | 2,473 | 63.2 | ▲55.3 |
| Labour Co-op | Karen Teresa McCarthy | 773 | 19.7 | ▼45.1 |
| Labour Co-op | Jamie Christopher Scott | 604 | 15.4 | ▼49.7 |
| Reform | Gary John Faulkner | 319 | 8.1 | New |
| Reform | Neetu Vikal | 238 | 6.1 | New |
| Conservative | Neil Johnson | 237 | 6.1 | ▼3.0 |
| Conservative | Musa Nela | 176 | 4.5 | ▼5.6 |
| Liberal Democrats | Martin Mullaney | 170 | 4.3 | ▼3.8 |
| Liberal Democrats | Colin Andrew Ross | 136 | 3.5 | ▼3.3 |
| TUSC | Ben Lees | 46 | 1.2 | ▼3.6 |
| Majority | | 1,700 | 43.4 | |
| Turnout | | | 28.9 | |
| Registered electors | | 13,547 | | |
| Green gain from Labour | | Swing | | |
| Green gain from Labour | | Swing | | |

==== Bournville & Cotteridge ====
Bournville & Cotteridge (2 seats)
| Party | Candidate | Votes | % | ±% |
|---|---|---|---|---|
| Green | Roxanne Green | 2,062 | | |
| Labour | Nicky Brennan | 1,738 | | |
| Green | Richard George Winter | 1,735 | | |
| Labour | Muhammad Ali | 1,559 | | |
| Reform | Chris Lacey | 1,369 | | |
| Reform | Robert Grosvenor | 1,272 | | |
| Independent | Nigel Douglas Dawkins | 943 | | |
| Conservative | Andrew David Hardie | 937 | | |
| Liberal Democrats | David Stephen Radcliffe | 792 | | |
| Conservative | Chloe Octavia Kay Ingram | 698 | | |
| Liberal Democrats | Ilias Vazaios | 526 | | |
| Registered electors | | 14,250 | | |
| Green gain from Labour | | Swing | | |
| Labour hold | | Swing | | |

==== Brandwood and Kings Heath ====
Brandwood and Kings Heath (2 seats)
| Party | Candidate | Votes | % | ±% |
|---|---|---|---|---|
| Green | Jordan Oliver Phillip | 2,940 | 42.1 | ▲30.9 |
| Green | Hamzah Fahd Sheikh | 2,718 | 38.9 | ▲30.0 |
| Labour | Lisa Trickett | 1,826 | 26.1 | ▼22.9 |
| Labour | Ben Lockley | 1,702 | 24.4 | ▼25.8 |
| Reform | Stephen John Williams | 946 | 13.5 | New |
| Liberal Democrats | Emily Cox | 837 | 12.0 | ▼7.8 |
| Reform | Tochi Nwofor | 803 | 11.5 | New |
| Liberal Democrats | Cat Wagg | 599 | 8.6 | ▼5.9 |
| Conservative | Leeford Claude Beresford Allen | 451 | 6.5 | ▼11.0 |
| Independent | Mark Andrew Hudson | 334 | 4.8 | ▼4.0 |
| Conservative | Jamie Babington | 332 | 4.8 | ▼10.6 |
| Workers Party | Muhammad Saleem Malik | 87 | 1.2 | ▼1.0 |
| Majority | | 892 | 12.8 | |
| Turnout | | | 49.7 | |
| Registered electors | | 14,051 | | |
| Green gain from Labour | | Swing | | |
| Green gain from Labour | | Swing | | |

==== Bromford and Hodge Hill ====
Bromford and Hodge Hill (2 seats)
| Party | Candidate | Votes | % | ±% |
|---|---|---|---|---|
| Labour | Majid Mahmood | 1,560 | 31.5 | ▼39.5 |
| Labour | Diane Donaldson | 1,283 | 25.9 | ▼44.2 |
| Workers Party | Tasawar Hussain Shah | 877 | 17.7 | New |
| Reform | Duncan Douglas Riley | 872 | 17.6 | New |
| Reform | Andreas Nektarios Karagiannopoulos | 816 | 16.5 | New |
| Workers Party | Sardar Khan | 794 | 16.1 | New |
| Liberal Democrats | Iftekhar Hussain | 772 | 15.6 | ▲11.1 |
| Green | Zakarya Jonah | 751 | 15.2 | ▲9.1 |
| Liberal Democrats | Arshad Hussain | 701 | 14.2 | ▲9.8 |
| Green | Sylvia Jane McKears | 683 | 13.8 | New |
| Conservative | Robert William Cheshire | 223 | 4.5 | ▼10.5 |
| Conservative | Jack Annett | 175 | 3.5 | ▼7.7 |
| Majority | | 406 | 8.2 | |
| Turnout | | | 34.2 | |
| Registered electors | | 14,461 | | |
| Labour hold | | Swing | | |
| Labour hold | | Swing | | |

==== Castle Vale ====
Castle Vale
| Party | Candidate | Votes | % | ±% |
|---|---|---|---|---|
| Labour | Ray Goodwin | 899 | 44.4 | ▲3.9 |
| Reform | Ross Copeland | 855 | 42.2 | New |
| Green | Margaret Okole | 124 | 6.1 | ▼31.0 |
| Conservative | Roman Chapman | 107 | 5.3 | ▼16.3 |
| Liberal Democrats | Trevor Sword | 30 | 1.5 | New |
| Workers Party | Louise Arabella Scrivens | 11 | 0.5 | New |
| Majority | | 44 | 2.2 | |
| Turnout | | | 29.79 | |
| Registered electors | | 6,765 | | |
| Labour hold | | Swing | | |

==== Druids Heath and Monyhull ====
Druids Heath and Monyhull
| Party | Candidate | Votes | % | ±% |
|---|---|---|---|---|
| Green | Julien Pritchard | 1,907 | 64.3 | ▼10.2 |
| Reform | Aman Singh | 734 | 24.7 | New |
| Conservative | Stephen Brown | 140 | 4.7 | ▼1.7 |
| Labour | Muhammad Ishtiaq | 119 | 4.0 | ▼13.9 |
| Liberal Democrats | Gavin Clement | 54 | 1.8 | ▲0.9 |
| Workers Party | Giri Siva | 14 | 0.5 | New |
| Majority | | 1,173 | 39.5 | |
| Turnout | | | 39.4 | |
| Registered electors | | 7,536 | | |
| Green hold | | Swing | | |

==== Edgbaston ====
Edgbaston (2 seats)
| Party | Candidate | Votes | % | ±% |
|---|---|---|---|---|
| Conservative | Deirdre Caroline Alden | 1,847 | | |
| Conservative | Matt Bennett | 1,761 | | |
| Green | Nathan James Hogg | 1,132 | | |
| Green | Oscar George Prosser | 1,081 | | |
| Labour | Mandy Sanghera | 674 | | |
| Labour | Onkar Shergill | 561 | | |
| Reform | Simon Gibbons | 470 | | |
| Reform | Madhu Vidhani | 366 | | |
| Liberal Democrats | Radley Russell | 294 | | |
| Liberal Democrats | Mike Ward | 251 | | |
| Registered electors | | 11,134 | | |
| Conservative hold | | Swing | | |
| Conservative hold | | Swing | | |

==== Erdington ====
Erdington (2 seats)
| Party | Candidate | Votes | % | ±% |
|---|---|---|---|---|
| Conservative | Robert James Cambray Alden | 2,424 | 44.1 | ▼10.7 |
| Conservative | Gareth Raymond Moore | 1,996 | 36.3 | ▼9.1 |
| Reform | Kenneth Oliver Morris | 1,088 | 19.8 | New |
| Labour | Lauren Walden | 1,019 | 18.5 | ▼18.0 |
| Labour | Mahtab Uddin | 952 | 17.3 | ▼18.7 |
| Green | Alex Karra-Webb | 906 | 16.5 | ▲11.6 |
| Green | Mette Christoffersen | 883 | 16.1 | ▲12.5 |
| Reform | Ali Taranssari | 769 | 14.0 | New |
| Liberal Democrats | Richard Haydn May | 187 | 3.4 | ▲0.8 |
| Liberal Democrats | Shefa Choudhury | 174 | 3.2 | ▲1.3 |
| Workers Party | Paul Jonathan Scrivens | 69 | 1.3 | New |
| TUSC | Corinthia Ward | 64 | 1.2 | ▼0.9 |
| Majority | | 908 | 16.5 | |
| Turnout | | | 36.91 | |
| Registered electors | | 14,903 | | |
| Conservative hold | | Swing | | |
| Conservative hold | | Swing | | |

==== Frankley Great Park ====
Frankley Great Park
| Party | Candidate | Votes | % | ±% |
|---|---|---|---|---|
| Reform | Gemma Louise Guttridge | 1,192 | 38.9 | New |
| Independent | Simon Morrall | 691 | 22.6 | New |
| Green | Peter Beck | 407 | 13.3 | ▲9.4 |
| Labour | Mohamed Saad | 326 | 10.6 | ▼21.4 |
| Conservative | Tilton Tobias Storer | 317 | 10.3 | ▼50.7 |
| Liberal Democrats | Peter Lloyd | 131 | 4.3 | ▲1.1 |
| Majority | | 501 | 16.4 | |
| Turnout | | | 34.5 | |
| Registered electors | | 8,830 | | |
| Reform gain from Conservative | | Swing | | |

==== Garretts Green ====
Garretts Green
| Party | Candidate | Votes | % | ±% |
|---|---|---|---|---|
| Labour | Saddak Miah | 988 | 39.3 | ▼28.2 |
| Reform | Carl Richard Webster | 864 | 34.4 | New |
| Green | Carla Busuttil | 310 | 12.3 | New |
| Liberal Democrats | Benjamin O'Callaghan | 149 | 5.9 | ▼16.7 |
| Conservative | Daphne Claire Hall | 109 | 4.3 | ▼5.6 |
| Workers Party | Peter Higgins | 95 | 3.8 | New |
| Majority | | 124 | 4.9 | |
| Turnout | | | 33.91 | |
| Registered electors | | 7,396 | | |
| Labour hold | | Swing | | |

==== Glebe Farm & Tile Cross ====
Glebe Farm & Tile Cross (2 seats)
| Party | Candidate | Votes | % | ±% |
|---|---|---|---|---|
| Reform | Jess Ankrett | 1,394 | 31.3 | |
| Workers Party | Shehryar Kayani | 1,163 | 26.1 | |
| Reform | Satnam Tank | 1,157 | 26.0 | |
| Workers Party | Amir Shafique | 1,078 | 24.2 | |
| Labour | Marje Bridle | 1,035 | 23.2 | |
| Labour | John Cotton | 896 | 20.1 | |
| Green | Gary Charles | 654 | 14.7 | |
| Green | Gareth Hooper | 569 | 12.8 | |
| Conservative | Chris Fikeis | 252 | 5.7 | |
| Independent | Faisal Mahmood | 251 | 5.6 | |
| Conservative | Fergus David Robinson | 229 | 5.1 | |
| Liberal Democrats | Javed Khan | 139 | 3.1 | |
| Liberal Democrats | Uzman Kiani | 103 | 2.3 | |
| Registered electors | | 15,800 | | |
| Reform gain from Labour | | Swing | | |
| Workers Party gain from Labour | | Swing | | |

==== Gravelly Hill ====
Gravelly Hill
| Party | Candidate | Votes | % | ±% |
|---|---|---|---|---|
| Labour Co-op | Mick Brown | 620 | 29.6 | ▼22.2 |
| Liberal Democrats | Mohammed Amin | 417 | 19.9 | ▲17.7 |
| Green | Imran Ali Khan | 360 | 17.2 | ▼6.1 |
| Reform | Maisie Lou Evelyn Wilton | 344 | 16.4 | New |
| Independent | Wahid Akhtar | 168 | 8.0 | New |
| Conservative | Julia Anne Mackey | 123 | 5.9 | ▼15.2 |
| Independent | Asif Mehmood | 66 | 3.1 | New |
| Majority | | 203 | 9.7 | |
| Turnout | | | 29 | |
| Registered electors | | 7,110 | | |
| Labour hold | | Swing | | |

=== Wards beginning H–R ===
==== Hall Green North ====
Hall Green North (2 seats)
| Party | Candidate | Votes | % | ±% |
|---|---|---|---|---|
| Green | Mansoor Qureshi | 2,833 | 44.1 | ▲35.6 |
| Green | Haroon Salim | 2,429 | 37.8 | New |
| Conservative | Harriet Rose O'Hara | 1,014 | 15.8 | ▼13.3 |
| Labour | Akhlaq Ahmed | 824 | 12.8 | ▼38.6 |
| Conservative | Malik Nasir Iqbal | 802 | 12.5 | ▼13.2 |
| Reform | Jordan Holland | 774 | 12.0 | New |
| Reform | Kyra Nicole Mattison | 716 | 11.1 | New |
| Labour | Saima Suleman | 679 | 10.6 | ▼38.8 |
| Liberal Democrats | Shabina Bano | 674 | 10.5 | ▲0.8 |
| Liberal Democrats | Estelle Dukes-Hogan | 630 | 9.8 | ▲0.4 |
| Independent | Belal Arabi | 457 | 7.1 | New |
| Workers Party | Fahad Ali Hussain | 309 | 4.8 | New |
| Majority | | 1,415 | 22.0 | |
| Turnout | | | 39.34 | |
| Registered electors | | 16,346 | | |
| Green gain from Labour | | Swing | | |
| Green gain from Labour | | Swing | | |

==== Hall Green South ====
Hall Green South
| Party | Candidate | Votes | % | ±% |
|---|---|---|---|---|
| Conservative | Tim Huxtable | 2,117 | 56.6 | ▲5.1 |
| Green | Daniel Thomas Carpenter | 638 | 17.1 | ▲11.8 |
| Reform | Stephen Taylor | 429 | 11.5 | New |
| Labour | Shafaq Ahmed | 326 | 8.7 | ▼29.9 |
| Workers Party | Aminah Shabir | 163 | 4.4 | New |
| Liberal Democrats | David Alan Lickiss | 68 | 1.8 | ▼2.5 |
| Majority | | 1,479 | 39.5 | |
| Turnout | | | 46.6 | |
| Registered electors | | 8,015 | | |
| Conservative hold | | Swing | | |

==== Handsworth ====
Handsworth
| Party | Candidate | Votes | % | ±% |
|---|---|---|---|---|
| Green | Ed Freshwater | 958 | 40.7 | ▲35.1 |
| Labour | Mosese Dakunivosa | 443 | 18.8 | ▼64.1 |
| Independent | Chaman Lal | 288 | 12.2 | New |
| Independent | Abdulaziz Mohamed | 273 | 11.6 | New |
| Conservative | Enam Rahman | 231 | 9.8 | ▲2.9 |
| Reform | Curtis James Brittain | 110 | 4.7 | New |
| Liberal Democrats | Paul Andrew Bishop | 53 | 2.2 | ▼1.8 |
| Majority | | 515 | 21.9 | |
| Turnout | | | 32 | |
| Registered electors | | 7,230 | | |
| Green gain from Labour | | Swing | | |

==== Handsworth Wood ====
Handsworth Wood (2 seats)
| Party | Candidate | Votes | % | ±% |
|---|---|---|---|---|
| Labour | Narinder Kaur Kooner | 1,858 | 38.6 | ▼23.2 |
| Labour | Randeep Kaur Kular | 1,582 | 32.8 | ▼31.3 |
| Independent | Sam Uddin | 744 | 15.4 | New |
| Green | Junaid Hafeez | 703 | 14.6 | New |
| Green | Peter John Sheahan | 673 | 14.0 | New |
| Independent | Umar Hayat Khan | 577 | 12.0 | New |
| Reform | Neil James Brown | 550 | 11.4 | New |
| Conservative | Ravinder Singh Chumber | 549 | 11.4 | ▼8.6 |
| Reform | Michael George Clark | 510 | 10.6 | New |
| Independent | Lalit Kumar Banger | 452 | 9.4 | New |
| Conservative | Devia Surti | 432 | 9.0 | ▼6.2 |
| Liberal Democrats | Stephen Michael Hallam | 194 | 4.0 | ▼6.3 |
| Liberal Democrats | Gerald Watts | 172 | 3.6 | ▼6.4 |
| Independent | Junior Atholi | 75 | 1.6 | New |
| Majority | | 838 | 17.4 | |
| Turnout | | | 34.2 | |
| Registered electors | | 14,082 | | |
| Labour hold | | Swing | | |
| Labour hold | | Swing | | |

==== Harborne ====
Harborne (2 seats)
| Party | Candidate | Votes | % | ±% |
|---|---|---|---|---|
| Independent | Martin John Brooks | 1,723 | 25.2 | New |
| Green | Kevin James Carmody | 1,463 | 21.4 | ▲10.0 |
| Conservative | Hugo George Rasenberg | 1,411 | 20.7 | ▼14.3 |
| Labour | Richard William Moore | 1,344 | 19.7 | ▼33.6 |
| Green | Ben Goodwin | 1,289 | 18.9 | New |
| Labour | Hasnain Qamar Rashid Bhatti Khan | 1,228 | 18.0 | ▼33.3 |
| Conservative | Amaar Shahzada | 1,012 | 14.8 | ▼16.2 |
| Reform | Aniraj Sharma | 987 | 14.5 | New |
| Reform | Jyotsna Singh | 902 | 13.2 | New |
| Independent | James Peter Cross | 846 | 12.4 | New |
| Liberal Democrats | Sarah Marwick | 407 | 6.0 | ▼3.7 |
| Liberal Democrats | Christopher John Bertram | 396 | 5.8 | ▼2.5 |
| Independent | James Victor Burgess | 347 | 5.1 | New |
| Majority | | 52 | 0.8 | |
| Turnout | | | 43.42 | |
| Registered electors | | 15,729 | | |
| Independent hold | | Swing | | |
| Green gain from Labour | | Swing | | |

==== Heartlands ====
Heartlands
| Party | Candidate | Votes | % | ±% |
|---|---|---|---|---|
| Labour | Shafique Shah | 1,023 | 39.0 | ▼40.8 |
| Birmingham Community Independents | Danny Mazhar | 625 | 23.8 | New |
| Green | Mateen Seharai | 359 | 13.7 | New |
| Independent | Sajid Hussain | 224 | 8.5 | New |
| Liberal Democrats | Abid Ali | 180 | 6.9 | ▲0.3 |
| Reform | Sathish Kumar Raman | 154 | 5.9 | New |
| Conservative | Md Ohidul Islam | 56 | 2.1 | ▼11.5 |
| Majority | | 398 | 15.2 | |
| Turnout | | | 34.4 | |
| Registered electors | | 7,601 | | |
| Labour hold | | Swing | | |

==== Highter’s Heath ====
Highter’s Heath
| Party | Candidate | Votes | % | ±% |
|---|---|---|---|---|
| Conservative | Adam Andrew Higgs | 1,342 | 45.3 | ▼9.5 |
| Reform | Jason West | 877 | 29.6 | New |
| Green | Joanne Shemmans | 419 | 14.1 | ▲8.6 |
| Labour | Joe Samuels | 269 | 9.1 | ▼30.6 |
| Liberal Democrats | Iain David Bowen | 56 | 1.9 | New |
| Majority | | 465 | 15.7 | |
| Turnout | | | 38.4 | |
| Registered electors | | 7,618 | | |
| Conservative hold | | Swing | | |

==== Holyhead ====
Holyhead
| Party | Candidate | Votes | % | ±% |
|---|---|---|---|---|
| Independent | Rinkal Shergill | 775 | 34.8 | New |
| Labour | Keshia Hamilton | 751 | 33.8 | ▼42.1 |
| Green | Nigel Clough | 334 | 15.0 | New |
| Conservative | Martin Clarke | 132 | 5.9 | ▼0.3 |
| Reform | Mark Richard Dainty | 93 | 4.2 | New |
| Liberal Democrats | Faizan Tanveer | 64 | 2.9 | ▼1.6 |
| Independent | Alexander Samuel Vivian Jaddoo | 50 | 2.2 | New |
| Independent | Senior Atholi | 26 | 1.2 | New |
| Majority | | 24 | 1.1 | |
| Turnout | | | 31 | |
| Registered electors | | 7,131 | | |
| Independent hold | | Swing | | |

==== King’s Norton North ====
King’s Norton North
| Party | Candidate | Votes | % | ±% |
|---|---|---|---|---|
| Reform | Martin Derek Smith | 1,082 | 33.7 | New |
| Labour | Carmel Gertrude Corrigan | 786 | 24.5 | ▼30.9 |
| Conservative | Daniel Patrick Molloy-Brookes | 755 | 23.5 | ▼15.4 |
| Green | Joe Rooney | 452 | 14.1 | ▲10.3 |
| Liberal Democrats | Alexander Hemming | 138 | 4.3 | ▲2.4 |
| Majority | | 296 | 9.2 | |
| Turnout | | | 41.6 | |
| Registered electors | | 7,704 | | |
| Reform gain from Labour | | Swing | | |

==== King’s Norton South ====
King’s Norton South
| Party | Candidate | Votes | % | ±% |
|---|---|---|---|---|
| Green | Robert Andrew Grant | 1,725 | 60.3 | ▲9.6 |
| Reform | Agata Joanna Malec | 762 | 26.6 | New |
| Labour Co-op | Tony Kennedy | 172 | 6.0 | ▼26.6 |
| Conservative | Joel Samuel Brown | 166 | 5.8 | ▼10.5 |
| Liberal Democrats | Michael Sturt-Joy | 36 | 1.3 | New |
| Majority | | 963 | 33.7 | |
| Turnout | | | 36.5 | |
| Registered electors | | 7,838 | | |
| Green hold | | Swing | | |

==== Kingstanding ====
Kingstanding (2 seats)
| Party | Candidate | Votes | % | ±% |
|---|---|---|---|---|
| Reform | John Edward Lambert | 1,898 | 41.2 | New |
| Reform | Jex Parkin | 1,771 | 38.4 | New |
| Conservative | Alex Lawrence Richards | 1,059 | 23.0 | ▼21.2 |
| Conservative | Clifton Frederick Welch | 967 | 21.0 | ▼22.8 |
| Labour | Paul Lilly | 761 | 16.5 | ▼29.9 |
| Labour | Anita Ward | 681 | 14.8 | ▼27.1 |
| Green | Chris Lee | 606 | 13.2 | ▲8.9 |
| Green | Jerry Orme | 504 | 10.9 | ▲7.5 |
| Independent | Desmond Gustavus Jaddoo | 183 | 4.0 | New |
| Liberal Democrats | Asad Mehmood | 162 | 3.5 | ▼1.4 |
| Liberal Democrats | James Andrew Ayodele Chandler | 134 | 2.9 | New |
| Independent | Des Hughes | 120 | 2.6 | New |
| Majority | | 712 | 15.5 | |
| Turnout | | | 32.96 | |
| Registered electors | | 13,977 | | |
| Reform gain from Labour | | Swing | | |
| Reform gain from Conservative | | Swing | | |

==== Ladywood ====
Ladywood (2 seats)
| Party | Candidate | Votes | % | ±% |
|---|---|---|---|---|
| Green | Siobhan Bridget Harper-Nunes | 1,552 | | |
| Green | Raheem Humphreys | 1,382 | | |
| Labour | Sally Benton | 1,122 | | |
| Labour | Satvir Dosanjh | 928 | | |
| Reform | Jade Marie Cotton | 521 | | |
| Reform | Abhinav Priyadarshi Pandey | 466 | | |
| Conservative | Abigail Margaret Smith | 436 | | |
| Liberal Democrats | Lee Dargue | 433 | | |
| Conservative | Cindy Yip | 342 | | |
| Liberal Democrats | Zoobia Noor | 297 | | |
| Independent | Gary Edwin Cressman | 213 | | |
| Independent | Deborah Moria Maragh | 189 | | |
| Registered electors | | 17,939 | | |
| Green gain from Labour | | Swing | | |
| Green gain from Labour | | Swing | | |

==== Longbridge and West Heath ====
Longbridge and West Heath (2 seats)
| Party | Candidate | Votes | % | ±% |
|---|---|---|---|---|
| Reform | Charlie Latchford | 2,325 | 38.8 | New |
| Reform | Anthony Leslie Ward | 2,168 | 36.2 | New |
| Conservative | Jack Dixon | 1,769 | 29.5 | ▼22.7 |
| Conservative | Ron Storer | 1,700 | 28.4 | ▼17.4 |
| Green | Hannah Jones | 958 | 16.0 | ▲8.8 |
| Green | Matthew John Neville | 794 | 13.3 | ▲6.2 |
| Labour | Matthew Josef Lloyd | 674 | 11.2 | ▼22.2 |
| Labour | Femi Sanusi | 581 | 9.7 | ▼23.0 |
| Liberal Democrats | Francine Asonibare | 256 | 4.3 | ▼0.1 |
| Liberal Democrats | Tony Brett Young | 256 | 4.3 | ▲0.4 |
| Majority | | 399 | 6.7 | |
| Turnout | | | 38.4 | |
| Registered electors | | 15,603 | | |
| Reform gain from Conservative | | Swing | | |
| Reform gain from Conservative | | Swing | | |

==== Lozells ====
Lozells
| Party | Candidate | Votes | % | ±% |
|---|---|---|---|---|
| Independent | Taj Uddin | 1,406 | 38.4 | New |
| Labour | Samarah Zaffar | 1,014 | 27.7 | ▼43.0 |
| Independent | Raja Asim Khan | 551 | 15.1 | New |
| Green | Qiam Ud Din | 229 | 6.3 | ▲2.0 |
| Independent | Rafael Costa | 184 | 5.0 | New |
| Independent | Nufayej Rayean | 124 | 3.4 | New |
| Reform | Peter Charles John Hinton | 66 | 1.8 | New |
| Liberal Democrats | Andy King | 45 | 1.2 | New |
| Conservative | Dean Sisman | 40 | 1.1 | ▼23.9 |
| Majority | | 392 | 10.7 | |
| Turnout | | | 46 | |
| Registered electors | | 7,741 | | |
| Independent gain from Labour | | Swing | | |

==== Moseley ====
Moseley (2 seats)
| Party | Candidate | Votes | % | ±% |
|---|---|---|---|---|
| Liberal Democrats | Izzy Knowles | 3,724 | 54.5 | ▲2.3 |
| Liberal Democrats | Philip Mills | 2,139 | 31.3 | ▼0.9 |
| Green | Oliver Ashton | 1,785 | 26.1 | ▲16.6 |
| Green | Ayyub Ali | 1,718 | 25.2 | New |
| Labour | Stephen Pihlaja | 1,020 | 14.9 | ▼28.2 |
| Labour | Gwaza Mabhena | 823 | 12.1 | ▼24.6 |
| Reform | Joshua Bentley | 515 | 7.5 | New |
| Reform | Cheryl Ann Cuthel | 484 | 7.1 | New |
| Conservative | Margaret Goby | 291 | 4.3 | ▼2.7 |
| Conservative | Nayaz Qazi | 239 | 3.5 | ▼2.8 |
| Independent | Mukhtarim Shah | 189 | 2.8 | New |
| Majority | | 354 | 5.2 | |
| Turnout | | | 43.14 | |
| Registered electors | | 15,830 | | |
| Liberal Democrats hold | | Swing | | |
| Liberal Democrats hold | | Swing | | |

==== Nechells ====
Nechells
| Party | Candidate | Votes | % | ±% |
|---|---|---|---|---|
| Independent | Mansuur Ahmed | 977 | 44.9 | New |
| Labour | Marcelo Reka | 541 | 24.9 | ▼63.2 |
| Green | Md Abu Sufian | 287 | 13.2 | New |
| Reform | Sophie Juda Elizabeth | 212 | 9.7 | New |
| Liberal Democrats | Guled Farah | 81 | 3.7 | New |
| Conservative | Devinchi Warmington | 67 | 3.1 | ▼8.0 |
| TUSC | Conor O'Donovan | 12 | 0.6 | New |
| Majority | | 436 | 20.0 | |
| Turnout | | | 30.97 | |
| Registered electors | | 6,835 | | |
| Independent gain from Labour | | Swing | | |

==== Newtown ====
Newtown
| Party | Candidate | Votes | % | ±% |
|---|---|---|---|---|
| Labour | Rasheda Begum | 886 | 41.8 | ▼16.3 |
| Liberal Democrats | Rashia Khatun | 370 | 17.4 | ▲2.4 |
| Green | Hannah Mohammed | 348 | 16.4 | New |
| Independent | Amjad Hussain | 205 | 9.7 | New |
| Reform | Keith Alexander Rowe | 107 | 5.0 | New |
| Conservative | Burhan Miah | 105 | 4.9 | ▼10.1 |
| Independent | Sonya Anderson | 101 | 4.8 | New |
| Majority | | 516 | 24.3 | |
| Turnout | | | 27.7 | |
| Registered electors | | 7,586 | | |
| Labour hold | | Swing | | |

==== North Edgbaston ====
North Edgbaston (2 seats)
| Party | Candidate | Votes | % | ±% |
|---|---|---|---|---|
| Labour | Marcus Bernasconi | 1,996 | 42.0 | ▼23.7 |
| Labour | Sarina Younas | 1,662 | 35.0 | ▼25.8 |
| Green | Hanooshi Hassan | 1,206 | 25.4 | New |
| Green | Ralph Anthony Wallin | 995 | 20.9 | New |
| Independent | Amer Khan | 692 | 14.6 | New |
| Reform | Neil Jones | 453 | 9.5 | New |
| Reform | Joshua Pattison | 418 | 8.8 | New |
| Conservative | Kofi Agyei Tabiri Anarfi | 403 | 8.5 | ▼20.6 |
| Independent | Francois Xavier | 397 | 8.4 | New |
| Conservative | Shamsul Arifeen | 374 | 7.9 | ▼20.1 |
| Liberal Democrats | Alistair Dow | 213 | 4.5 | ▼3.1 |
| Liberal Democrats | Robert Ian Wright | 190 | 4.0 | ▼1.8 |
| Majority | | 456 | 9.6 | |
| Turnout | | | 31.33 | |
| Registered electors | | 15,168 | | |
| Labour hold | | Swing | | |
| Labour hold | | Swing | | |

==== Northfield ====
Northfield
| Party | Candidate | Votes | % | ±% |
|---|---|---|---|---|
| Reform | George Hall | 1,317 | 35.7 | New |
| Labour | Esther Rai | 964 | 26.1 | ▼30.5 |
| Conservative | Graham Knight | 702 | 19.0 | ▼15.7 |
| Green | Alfie Neumann | 499 | 13.5 | ▲9.0 |
| Liberal Democrats | Andy Moles | 211 | 5.7 | ▲1.5 |
| Majority | | 353 | 9.6 | |
| Turnout | | | 45.07 | |
| Registered electors | | 8,165 | | |
| Reform gain from Labour | | Swing | | |

==== Oscott ====
Oscott (2 seats)
| Party | Candidate | Votes | % | ±% |
|---|---|---|---|---|
| Reform | Graham Geoffrey Green | 1,945 | 39.4 | New |
| Reform | Martin James McAuley | 1,803 | 36.5 | New |
| Conservative | Alex Hall | 1,319 | 26.7 | ▼17.7 |
| Conservative | Charlotte Whitehouse | 1,132 | 22.9 | ▼22.4 |
| Labour | Francis Liam Barnett | 703 | 14.2 | ▼31.0 |
| Labour | Eleanor Louise Douglas | 670 | 13.6 | ▼22.6 |
| Green | Ian Knight | 623 | 12.6 | New |
| Green | Andrew Stevenson | 515 | 10.4 | New |
| Independent | Barbara Dring | 210 | 4.3 | New |
| Liberal Democrats | Joshua-John Bunting | 193 | 3.9 | ▼5.5 |
| Liberal Democrats | Nora Warnaby | 153 | 3.1 | ▼3.6 |
| Independent | Jack Matthew Brookes | 126 | 2.6 | New |
| Independent | Sajida Khan | 103 | 2.1 | New |
| Majority | | 484 | 9.8 | |
| Turnout | | | 34.4 | |
| Registered electors | | 14,343 | | |
| Reform gain from Conservative | | Swing | | |
| Reform gain from Labour | | Swing | | |

==== Perry Barr ====
Perry Barr (2 seats)
| Party | Candidate | Votes | % | ±% |
|---|---|---|---|---|
| Liberal Democrats | Morriam Jan | 1,720 | 33.9 | ▼9.9 |
| Liberal Democrats | James Hinton | 1,643 | 32.4 | ▼21.9 |
| Reform | David Allen | 1,070 | 21.1 | New |
| Reform | Barry Paul Wood | 848 | 16.7 | New |
| Green | Jonathan Hammond | 732 | 14.4 | New |
| Independent | Safiqul Islam | 657 | 13.0 | New |
| Independent | Hayyan Mohammed | 639 | 12.6 | New |
| Labour | Mehran Khuhro | 596 | 11.7 | ▼28.1 |
| Labour | Zarine Shaikh | 569 | 11.2 | ▼20.3 |
| Green | Edward Porteous | 563 | 11.1 | New |
| Conservative | Janet Coffey | 352 | 6.9 | ▼1.4 |
| Conservative | Elizabeth Ann Hall | 310 | 6.1 | ▼0.8 |
| TUSC | Joe Foster | 44 | 0.9 | New |
| Majority | | 573 | 11.3 | |
| Turnout | | | 34.94 | |
| Registered electors | | 14,520 | | |
| Liberal Democrats hold | | Swing | | |
| Liberal Democrats hold | | Swing | | |

==== Perry Common ====
Perry Common
| Party | Candidate | Votes | % | ±% |
|---|---|---|---|---|
| Reform | Sue Willetts | 1,020 | 42.3 | New |
| Labour | Jilly Bermingham | 487 | 20.2 | ▼32.5 |
| Green | Stephanie Boyle | 327 | 13.6 | ▲10.9 |
| Conservative | Husham Khan | 261 | 10.8 | ▼29.6 |
| Independent | Ahmed Ghulam | 213 | 8.8 | New |
| Liberal Democrats | Colin Edward Hill | 105 | 4.4 | ▲1.3 |
| Majority | | 533 | 22.1 | |
| Turnout | | | 31 | |
| Registered electors | | 7,763 | | |
| Reform gain from Labour | | Swing | | |

==== Pype Hayes ====
Pype Hayes
| Party | Candidate | Votes | % | ±% |
|---|---|---|---|---|
| Reform | Danny Brian Carter | 1,073 | 43.8 | New |
| Labour | Fayaz Khuhro | 513 | 21.0 | ▼26.7 |
| Conservative | Athena Christina Tsouvallaris | 331 | 13.5 | ▼29.4 |
| Green | Julian Skidmore | 309 | 12.6 | ▲7.1 |
| Liberal Democrats | Stephen Richard Allsop | 157 | 6.4 | ▲4.0 |
| Independent | Umar Ul-Haq | 64 | 2.6 | New |
| Majority | | 560 | 22.9 | |
| Turnout | | | 32.46 | |
| Registered electors | | 7,517 | | |
| Reform gain from Labour | | Swing | | |

==== Quinton ====
Quinton (2 seats)
| Party | Candidate | Votes | % | ±% |
|---|---|---|---|---|
| Independent | Sam Forsyth | 1,736 | 28.6 | New |
| Reform | Nagu Penakacherla | 1,416 | 23.3 | New |
| Reform | Sanjay Kumar Vikal | 1,305 | 21.5 | New |
| Labour | Narinder Kaur | 1,202 | 19.8 | ▼26.1 |
| Green | James Liam Pennington Bolton | 1,066 | 17.6 | ▲11.6 |
| Labour | Sohail Hussain | 1,005 | 16.6 | ▼27.6 |
| Green | James Robertson | 956 | 15.8 | New |
| Conservative | Asif Khan | 909 | 15.0 | ▼28.6 |
| Conservative | Nikhil Khadabadi | 783 | 12.9 | ▼29.2 |
| Liberal Democrats | Sue Anderson | 438 | 7.2 | ▲2.7 |
| Liberal Democrats | Gareth Hardy | 288 | 4.7 | ▲0.8 |
| Majority | | 111 | 1.8 | |
| Turnout | | | 40.57 | |
| Registered electors | | 14,954 | | |
| Independent hold | | Swing | | |
| Reform gain from Labour | | Swing | | |

==== Rubery and Rednal ====
Rubery and Rednal
| Party | Candidate | Votes | % | ±% |
|---|---|---|---|---|
| Reform | Rebecca Michelle Waters | 943 | 36.9 | New |
| Conservative | Adrian Joseph Delaney | 892 | 34.9 | ▼14.4 |
| Green | Billy John Wassell | 333 | 13.0 | ▲6.7 |
| Labour | Steve Haynes | 271 | 10.6 | ▼31.1 |
| Liberal Democrats | Paul Alton | 119 | 4.7 | ▲2.0 |
| Majority | | 51 | 2.0 | |
| Turnout | | | 35.8 | |
| Registered electors | | 7,165 | | |
| Reform gain from Conservative | | Swing | | |

=== Wards beginning S–Y ===
==== Shard End ====
Shard End
| Party | Candidate | Votes | % | ±% |
|---|---|---|---|---|
| Reform | Alan James Feeney | 1,262 | 51.3 | New |
| Labour | Fiona Williams | 488 | 19.8 | ▼40.6 |
| Green | Harry Ballard | 321 | 13.0 | ▲5.9 |
| Conservative | Tony Briggs | 155 | 6.3 | ▼19.9 |
| Independent | Ginge Smyth | 132 | 5.4 | New |
| Liberal Democrats | Christopher Francis Barber | 103 | 4.2 | ▼1.5 |
| Majority | | 774 | 31.5 | |
| Turnout | | | 29.04 | |
| Registered electors | | 8,496 | | |
| Reform gain from Labour | | Swing | | |

==== Sheldon ====
Sheldon (2 seats)
| Party | Candidate | Votes | % | ±% |
|---|---|---|---|---|
| Reform | Darren Colling | 2,102 | 39.0 | New |
| Reform | Rachel Ann Conaghan | 2,006 | 37.2 | New |
| Liberal Democrats | Paul Calvin Tilsley | 1,719 | 31.9 | ▼24.1 |
| Liberal Democrats | Colin Francis Green | 1,595 | 29.6 | ▼19.4 |
| Green | Mark Richard Meatcher | 492 | 9.1 | ▲2.1 |
| Green | Melanie Jane Smith | 482 | 9.0 | New |
| Labour | Gerald David Dickson | 414 | 7.7 | ▼19.0 |
| Labour | Meenatchi Gopal | 321 | 6.0 | ▼17.7 |
| Conservative | Mark Stewart Ackroyd | 313 | 5.8 | ▼12.2 |
| Conservative | Sara Jane Ackroyd | 296 | 5.5 | ▼10.9 |
| Workers Party | Haroon Ahmed Khattak | 235 | 4.4 | New |
| Workers Party | Sikander Aslam | 228 | 4.2 | New |
| Majority | | 287 | 5.3 | |
| Turnout | | | 37.1 | |
| Registered electors | | 14,516 | | |
| Reform gain from Liberal Democrats | | Swing | | |
| Reform gain from Liberal Democrats | | Swing | | |

==== Small Heath ====
Small Heath (2 seats)
| Party | Candidate | Votes | % | ±% |
|---|---|---|---|---|
| Liberal Democrats | Shaukat Ali Khan | 1,545 | 31.1 | ▲4.3 |
| Liberal Democrats | Mohammed Saeed | 1,305 | 26.2 | ▼3.0 |
| Your Party | Shafaq Hussain | 1,274 | 25.6 | New |
| Labour | Shanaz Ahmed | 1,047 | 21.1 | ▼23.4 |
| Your Party | Obaydul Kabir | 1,047 | 21.1 | New |
| Labour | Amaan Hader Ali | 882 | 17.7 | ▼24.0 |
| Green | Hayaan Bin Sultan Choudhury | 604 | 12.1 | New |
| Green | Kash Hanif | 551 | 11.1 | New |
| Workers Party | Ahmed Al-Athwari | 372 | 7.5 | New |
| Workers Party | Rehab Talukdar | 330 | 6.6 | New |
| Independent | Altaf Hussain | 254 | 5.1 | New |
| Reform | Sally Jane Cope | 135 | 2.7 | New |
| Reform | Amelia Vocari | 95 | 1.9 | New |
| Conservative | Amit Khanna | 63 | 1.3 | ▼21.2 |
| Conservative | Makham Singh Dhalivaal | 59 | 1.2 | ▼15.4 |
| Majority | | 31 | 0.6 | |
| Turnout | | | 36.4 | |
| Registered electors | | 13,658 | | |
| Liberal Democrats hold | | Swing | | |
| Liberal Democrats gain from Labour | | Swing | | |

==== Soho and Jewellery Quarter ====
Soho and Jewellery Quarter (2 seats)
| Party | Candidate | Votes | % | ±% |
|---|---|---|---|---|
| Labour | Shuranjeet Singh | 1,652 | 35.5 | ▼33.9 |
| Labour | Su Brooks | 1,548 | 33.3 | ▼28.8 |
| Green | Abbas Bhatti | 1,430 | 30.7 | ▲17.0 |
| Green | John Dell Macefield | 1,341 | 28.8 | New |
| Workers Party | Omar Yousaf | 579 | 12.4 | New |
| Reform | Nigel Frederick Barker | 473 | 10.2 | New |
| Workers Party | Katt Cremer | 437 | 9.4 | New |
| Reform | Nicola Kedeisha Walker-Rhoden | 389 | 8.4 | New |
| Conservative | Patricia Beverley Panton | 322 | 6.9 | ▼4.4 |
| Conservative | Sunil Poshakwale | 268 | 5.8 | ▼3.0 |
| Liberal Democrats | Violaine Mendez | 239 | 5.1 | ▼3.6 |
| Liberal Democrats | James Perrott | 220 | 4.7 | ▼2.3 |
| Majority | | 118 | 2.5 | |
| Turnout | | | 28.18 | |
| Registered electors | | 16,520 | | |
| Labour hold | | Swing | | |
| Labour hold | | Swing | | |

==== South Yardley ====
South Yardley
| Party | Candidate | Votes | % | ±% |
|---|---|---|---|---|
| Liberal Democrats | Zaker Choudhry | 1,382 | 49.0 | ▼6.3 |
| Reform | Aysan Al-Haq | 769 | 27.3 | New |
| Green | Martin John Guest | 329 | 11.7 | ▲7.0 |
| Labour | Gordon Lyew | 192 | 6.8 | ▼20.0 |
| Conservative | Anya Khan | 95 | 3.4 | ▼8.1 |
| Workers Party | Aheesha Zahir | 53 | 1.9 | New |
| Majority | | 613 | 21.7 | |
| Turnout | | | 37.8 | |
| Registered electors | | 7,473 | | |
| Liberal Democrats hold | | Swing | | |

==== Sparkbrook and Balsall Heath East ====
Sparkbrook and Balsall Heath East (2 seats)
| Party | Candidate | Votes | % | ±% |
|---|---|---|---|---|
| Independent | Jamil Khan | 1,945 | 36.6 | New |
| Independent | Raihaan Abbas | 1,622 | 30.5 | New |
| Green | Jo Hindley | 1,180 | 22.2 | ▲17.5 |
| Labour | Saima Ahmed | 1,040 | 19.6 | ▼49.2 |
| Green | Faizan Rind | 1,040 | 19.6 | New |
| Labour | Khalid Hanif | 900 | 16.9 | ▼44.5 |
| Your Party | Nowshed Abu | 643 | 12.1 | New |
| Liberal Democrats | Jerry Evans | 509 | 9.6 | ▲5.2 |
| Your Party | Shahid Hashmi | 469 | 8.8 | New |
| Liberal Democrats | Parwez Hussain | 345 | 6.5 | ▲3.2 |
| Reform | Gloria Sant'Agostino | 150 | 2.8 | New |
| Reform | Ryan Kevin Louis Willetts | 120 | 2.3 | New |
| Conservative | Nathaneal James Peters | 105 | 2.0 | ▼21.8 |
| Conservative | Nigel Paul Waldron | 64 | 1.2 | ▼18.5 |
| Majority | | 442 | 8.3 | |
| Turnout | | | 33.3 | |
| Registered electors | | 15,947 | | |
| Independent gain from Labour | | Swing | | |
| Independent gain from Labour | | Swing | | |

==== Sparkhill ====
Sparkhill (2 seats)
| Party | Candidate | Votes | % | ±% |
|---|---|---|---|---|
| Labour | Rashad Mahmood | 1,865 | 41.4 | ▼32.8 |
| Labour | Bushra Bi | 1,480 | 32.9 | ▼38.1 |
| Green | Safina Parveen Aftab | 1,164 | 25.9 | New |
| Green | Sal Naseem | 975 | 21.7 | New |
| Liberal Democrats | Tanveer Choudhry | 867 | 19.3 | ▲12.9 |
| Liberal Democrats | Tassawar Hussain | 679 | 15.1 | ▲11.0 |
| Independent | Shahid Butt | 453 | 10.1 | New |
| Independent | Adam Mirza | 325 | 7.2 | New |
| Independent | Hiyam Abdulhaq | 224 | 5.0 | New |
| Reform | Andrew Smith | 134 | 3.0 | New |
| Reform | Michael Lee O'Shea | 129 | 2.9 | New |
| Conservative | Jennifer Walcott-Merry-Rose | 114 | 2.5 | ▼15.7 |
| Conservative | Degigha Walcott | 107 | 2.4 | ▼10.8 |
| Majority | | 316 | 7.0 | |
| Turnout | | | 33.31 | |
| Registered electors | | 13,515 | | |
| Labour hold | | Swing | | |
| Labour hold | | Swing | | |

==== Stirchley ====
Stirchley
| Party | Candidate | Votes | % | ±% |
|---|---|---|---|---|
| Green | Kamel Hawwash | 1,444 | 39.4 | ▲30.6 |
| Labour Co-op | Mary Locke | 1,274 | 34.7 | ▼38.0 |
| Reform | Ian William Derek Bishop | 600 | 16.4 | New |
| Conservative | James William Edward Dooley | 193 | 5.3 | ▼8.5 |
| Liberal Democrats | Philip Andrew Banting | 157 | 4.3 | ▼0.5 |
| Majority | | 170 | 4.6 | |
| Turnout | | | 49.29 | |
| Registered electors | | 7,401 | | |
| Green gain from Labour Co-op | | Swing | | |

==== Stockland Green ====
Stockland Green (2 seats)
| Party | Candidate | Votes | % | ±% |
|---|---|---|---|---|
| Independent | Amar Khan | 1,226 | 26.3 | New |
| Reform | Manni Butt | 1,023 | 21.9 | New |
| Labour | Derek Douglas | 1,022 | 21.9 | ▼39.5 |
| Reform | Pete Perryman | 989 | 21.2 | New |
| Labour | Shabrana Hussain | 945 | 20.3 | ▼36.1 |
| Independent | Jane Esther Jones | 906 | 19.4 | New |
| Green | Bryn Lee Roberts | 728 | 15.6 | ▲10.1 |
| Green | Alastair David Webster | 556 | 11.9 | ▲6.6 |
| Conservative | Stella Murphy | 337 | 7.2 | ▼15.6 |
| Conservative | Gareth Francis Thomas Compton | 334 | 7.2 | ▼15.5 |
| Independent | Sam Richards | 202 | 4.3 | New |
| Liberal Democrats | Steven Enahoro | 185 | 4.0 | ▼0.8 |
| Liberal Democrats | Richard James Hemus | 155 | 3.3 | ▲0.9 |
| TUSC | Ted Woodley | 49 | 1.1 | ▼2.2 |
| Majority | | 1 | 0.0 | |
| Turnout | | | 30.33 | |
| Registered electors | | 15,374 | | |
| Independent gain from Labour | | Swing | | |
| Reform gain from Labour | | Swing | | |

==== Sutton Four Oaks ====
Sutton Four Oaks
| Party | Candidate | Votes | % | ±% |
|---|---|---|---|---|
| Conservative | Raaj Shamji | 2,193 | 58.2 | ▼7.4 |
| Reform | Kay Kaur | 827 | 21.9 | New |
| Green | Alex Graham | 325 | 8.6 | ▲2.6 |
| Labour | Jan Dewsbery | 260 | 6.9 | ▼11.0 |
| Liberal Democrats | David Michael Willett | 166 | 4.4 | ▼5.3 |
| Majority | | 1,366 | 36.2 | |
| Registered electors | | 7,518 | | |
| Conservative hold | | Swing | | |

==== Sutton Mere Green ====
Sutton Mere Green
| Party | Candidate | Votes | % | ±% |
|---|---|---|---|---|
| Conservative | Meirion Jenkins | 1,809 | 46.0 | ▼18.0 |
| Reform | Sarah Elizabeth Myers | 1,068 | 27.2 | New |
| Green | Colin Leslie Fredric Marriott | 410 | 10.4 | ▲4.8 |
| Liberal Democrats | Kerry Frater | 406 | 10.3 | ▲1.3 |
| Labour | Simon McDonald | 238 | 6.1 | ▼15.3 |
| Majority | | 741 | 18.9 | |
| Turnout | | | 49.32 | |
| Registered electors | | 7,941 | | |
| Conservative hold | | Swing | | |

==== Sutton Reddicap ====
Sutton Reddicap
| Party | Candidate | Votes | % | ±% |
|---|---|---|---|---|
| Conservative | Richard Frederick Jex Parkin | 1,618 | 52.8 | ▼8.2 |
| Reform | James Kelly | 798 | 26.1 | New |
| Green | Richard Painter | 279 | 9.1 | ▼0.9 |
| Labour | Jane Lane | 231 | 7.5 | ▼21.5 |
| Liberal Democrats | Benjamin Godwin | 136 | 4.4 | New |
| Majority | | 820 | 26.8 | |
| Turnout | | | 41.57 | |
| Registered electors | | 7,340 | | |
| Conservative hold | | Swing | | |

==== Sutton Roughley ====
Sutton Roughley
| Party | Candidate | Votes | % | ±% |
|---|---|---|---|---|
| Conservative | Harry Parmar | 1,657 | 40.4 | ▼21.5 |
| Reform | Michael Hunt | 1,361 | 33.2 | New |
| Labour | Roger Barley | 446 | 10.9 | ▼17.2 |
| Green | Esther Caroline Passingham | 418 | 10.2 | New |
| Liberal Democrats | Timothy James Cotterill | 222 | 5.4 | ▼3.7 |
| Majority | | 296 | 7.2 | |
| Turnout | | | 48.46 | |
| Registered electors | | 8,422 | | |
| Conservative hold | | Swing | | |

==== Sutton Trinity ====
Sutton Trinity
| Party | Candidate | Votes | % | ±% |
|---|---|---|---|---|
| Conservative | David Christopher Pears | 1,357 | 36.6 | ▼11.4 |
| Green | Ben Auton | 1,102 | 29.7 | ▲18.6 |
| Reform | Paul Maxwell Gardiner | 856 | 23.1 | New |
| Labour | Joe Blenkinsop | 291 | 7.8 | ▼24.4 |
| Liberal Democrats | Regine Wilber | 106 | 2.9 | ▼5.8 |
| Majority | | 255 | 6.9 | |
| Turnout | | | 48.7 | |
| Registered electors | | 7,607 | | |
| Conservative hold | | Swing | | |

==== Sutton Vesey ====
Sutton Vesey (2 seats)
| Party | Candidate | Votes | % | ±% |
|---|---|---|---|---|
| Conservative | John Cooper | 2,414 | 32.0 | ▼4.0 |
| Conservative | Anja Pawson | 2,394 | 31.7 | ▲2.6 |
| Labour | Rob Pocock | 2,224 | 29.5 | ▼34.3 |
| Reform | Gary Hall | 1,974 | 26.2 | New |
| Reform | Kirsty Holden | 1,945 | 25.8 | New |
| Labour | Charlotte Julia Fieldhouse | 1,753 | 23.2 | ▼29.4 |
| Green | Liron Alethea Thomas Morgner | 756 | 10.0 | New |
| Green | Ross Douglas Stephens | 751 | 10.0 | New |
| Liberal Democrats | Jenny Wilkinson | 272 | 3.6 | ▼2.7 |
| Liberal Democrats | Steven Wilber | 201 | 2.7 | ▼2.0 |
| Majority | | 170 | 2.3 | |
| Turnout | | | 50.1 | |
| Registered electors | | 15,052 | | |
| Conservative gain from Labour | | Swing | | |
| Conservative gain from Labour | | Swing | | |

==== Sutton Walmley and Minworth ====
Sutton Walmley and Minworth (2 seats)
| Party | Candidate | Votes | % | ±% |
|---|---|---|---|---|
| Conservative | John Perks | 2,540 | 43.0 | ▼19.2 |
| Conservative | Ken Wood | 2,246 | 38.1 | ▼14.0 |
| Reform | Claire Holton | 2,175 | 36.9 | New |
| Reform | James Edward White | 1,981 | 33.6 | New |
| Green | Jacqueline Patricia Spargo | 533 | 9.0 | ▼1.7 |
| Green | Adam Haycock | 532 | 9.0 | New |
| Labour | Manish Kumar Puri | 407 | 6.9 | ▼14.6 |
| Labour | Ehsan Ibrahim | 362 | 6.1 | ▼12.2 |
| Liberal Democrats | David Cooke | 335 | 5.7 | ▼5.9 |
| Liberal Democrats | Mark Andrew Lewis | 245 | 4.2 | ▼6.5 |
| Majority | | 71 | 1.2 | |
| Turnout | | | 47.07 | |
| Registered electors | | 12,539 | | |
| Conservative hold | | Swing | | |
| Conservative hold | | Swing | | |

==== Sutton Wylde Green ====
Sutton Wylde Green
| Party | Candidate | Votes | % | ±% |
|---|---|---|---|---|
| Conservative | Alex Yip | 1,981 | 52.4 | ▼4.8 |
| Reform | Jon Chapman | 771 | 20.4 | New |
| Green | Zoe Rachel Challenor | 452 | 12.0 | ▲5.4 |
| Labour | Adeen Irfan | 397 | 10.5 | ▼13.7 |
| Liberal Democrats | Malcolm Spencer | 181 | 4.8 | ▼6.6 |
| Majority | | 1,210 | 32.0 | |
| Turnout | | | 52.78 | |
| Registered electors | | 7,178 | | |
| Conservative hold | | Swing | | |

==== Tyseley & Hay Mills ====
Tyseley & Hay Mills
| Party | Candidate | Votes | % | ±% |
|---|---|---|---|---|
| Green | Atikur Rahman | 550 | 20.5 | ▲13.9 |
| Liberal Democrats | Ian Anthony George Garrett | 463 | 17.3 | ▲7.0 |
| Labour | Yvette Roselyn John | 463 | 17.3 | ▼57.2 |
| Reform | John Martin Howard | 432 | 16.1 | New |
| Workers Party | Mohammad Nadeem | 383 | 14.3 | New |
| Conservative | Zafar Iqbal | 303 | 11.3 | ▲2.6 |
| Your Party | Dawud Mustifa | 90 | 3.4 | New |
| Majority | | 87 | 3.2 | |
| Turnout | | | 32.6 | |
| Registered electors | | 8,214 | | |
| Green gain from Labour | | Swing | | |

==== Ward End ====
Ward End
| Party | Candidate | Votes | % | ±% |
|---|---|---|---|---|
| Independent | Harris Khaliq | 2,078 | 61.2 | New |
| Labour | Mohammed Aikhlaq | 525 | 15.5 | ▼28.2 |
| Liberal Democrats | Naz Ali | 328 | 9.7 | ▼24.8 |
| Green | Catherine Turner | 225 | 6.6 | ▲1.6 |
| Reform | Maria Anna Green | 165 | 4.9 | New |
| Workers Party | Julian Nistor | 31 | 0.9 | New |
| Conservative | Aashima Mehta | 28 | 0.8 | ▼16.0 |
| Independent | Mahreen Tasleem | 18 | 0.5 | New |
| Majority | | 1,553 | 45.7 | |
| Turnout | | | 39.62 | |
| Registered electors | | 8,563 | | |
| Independent gain from Labour | | Swing | | |

==== Weoley and Selly Oak ====
Weoley and Selly Oak (2 seats)
| Party | Candidate | Votes | % | ±% |
|---|---|---|---|---|
| Reform | Glyn Marston | 1,645 | 27.2 | New |
| Reform | Cherie Louise Waddingham | 1,525 | 25.2 | New |
| Conservative | George Louis Webb | 1,502 | 24.8 | ▼11.1 |
| Conservative | Jigar Bhagalia | 1,461 | 24.2 | ▼10.0 |
| Green | Eleanor Cotton | 1,284 | 21.2 | ▲14.0 |
| Labour | Kiran Gulia | 1,221 | 20.2 | ▼33.4 |
| Labour | Stewart David Holroyd | 1,150 | 19.0 | ▼30.8 |
| Green | Rob Fitt | 1,123 | 18.6 | ▲11.4 |
| Liberal Democrats | Elly Stanton | 373 | 6.2 | ▼0.2 |
| Liberal Democrats | Paolo Said Gianluca | 279 | 4.6 | ▼0.8 |
| Independent | Marie Buchan | 94 | 1.6 | New |
| Majority | | 23 | 0.4 | |
| Turnout | | | 38.69 | |
| Registered electors | | 15,636 | | |
| Reform gain from Labour | | Swing | | |
| Reform gain from Labour | | Swing | | |

==== Yardley East ====
Yardley East
| Party | Candidate | Votes | % | ±% |
|---|---|---|---|---|
| Liberal Democrats | Deborah Harries | 979 | 34.6 | ▼24.1 |
| Reform | Vaishali Sathish Kumar Raman | 762 | 26.9 | New |
| Green | Claire Marie Hammond | 419 | 14.8 | New |
| Labour | Rofique Miah | 387 | 13.7 | ▼18.8 |
| Workers Party | Naushaba Yaqoob | 153 | 5.4 | New |
| Conservative | Thomas Huxley | 132 | 4.7 | ▼3.7 |
| Majority | | 217 | 7.7 | |
| Turnout | | | 35.61 | |
| Registered electors | | 7,948 | | |
| Liberal Democrats hold | | Swing | | |

==== Yardley West and Stechford ====
Yardley West and Stechford
| Party | Candidate | Votes | % | ±% |
|---|---|---|---|---|
| Liberal Democrats | Baber Baz | 1,911 | 60.8 | ▼9.9 |
| Reform | Malcolm Preston | 405 | 12.9 | New |
| Green | Mohammed Imran Ameer | 368 | 11.7 | New |
| Labour | Liaqat Ali | 278 | 8.8 | ▼16.6 |
| Workers Party | Naila Iqbal | 126 | 4.0 | New |
| Conservative | Leo Hardcastle | 57 | 1.8 | ▼1.7 |
| Majority | | 1,506 | 47.9 | |
| Turnout | | | 39.2 | |
| Registered electors | | 7,976 | | |
| Liberal Democrats hold | | Swing | | |

== Opinion polls and projections ==
=== Projection ===
| Date(s) conducted | Provider | Area | Lab | Con | LD | Grn | Ref | Others |
|---|---|---|---|---|---|---|---|---|
| 5 May 2022 | 2026 local elections | – | 17 | 16 | 12 | 19 | 23 | 14 |
| March-April 2026 | ITV News Central/More in Common | Birmingham | 32 | 25 | 10 | 7 | 26 | 22 |
| 5 May 2022 | 2022 local elections | – | 65 | 22 | 12 | 2 | 0 | 0 |

- Ongoing polls suggested a large increase in the election of independent candidates, particularly in areas with a high density of ethnic minority voters.
- Labour was expected to lose their majority, resulting in a No Overall Control council, which did occur.

== Changes between 2026 and 2030 ==
- In June 2026, Majid Mahmood and Diane Donaldson (both Bromford and Hodge Hill) resigned from the Labour group.
- In July 2026, Rebecca Waters (Rubery and Rednal) was suspended from the Reform UK group after voting against the party on the council leadership.
- In August 2026, Siobhan Harper-Nunes (Ladywood) was suspended from the Green Party group over charges she assaulted three police officers, a member of police staff and a member of the public.
- In September 2026, Bushra Bi (Sparkhill) left the Labour Party and joined the Green Party.
- In October 2026, Alan Feeney (Shard End) resigned following revelations he made racist and sexist comments during the local election campaign.

=== By-elections ===
==== Shard End ====
Shard End by-election: 26 November 2026
| Party | Candidate | Votes | % | ±% |
|---|---|---|---|---|
| Green | Shaun Allen-Dooley | | | |
| Restore | Jack Brookes | | | |
| Labour | Gerald Dickson | | | |
| Workers Party | Farhad Hussain | | | |
| Reform | Sarah Myers | | | |
| Independent | Duncan Riley | | | |
| Conservative | Clifton Welch | | | |
| Majority | | | | |
| Turnout | | | | |
| | | Swing | | |
