= 2012 Birmingham City Council election =

English election

- 3 May 2012

One third (40) seats to Birmingham City Council 61 seats needed for a majority

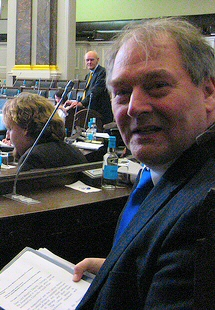

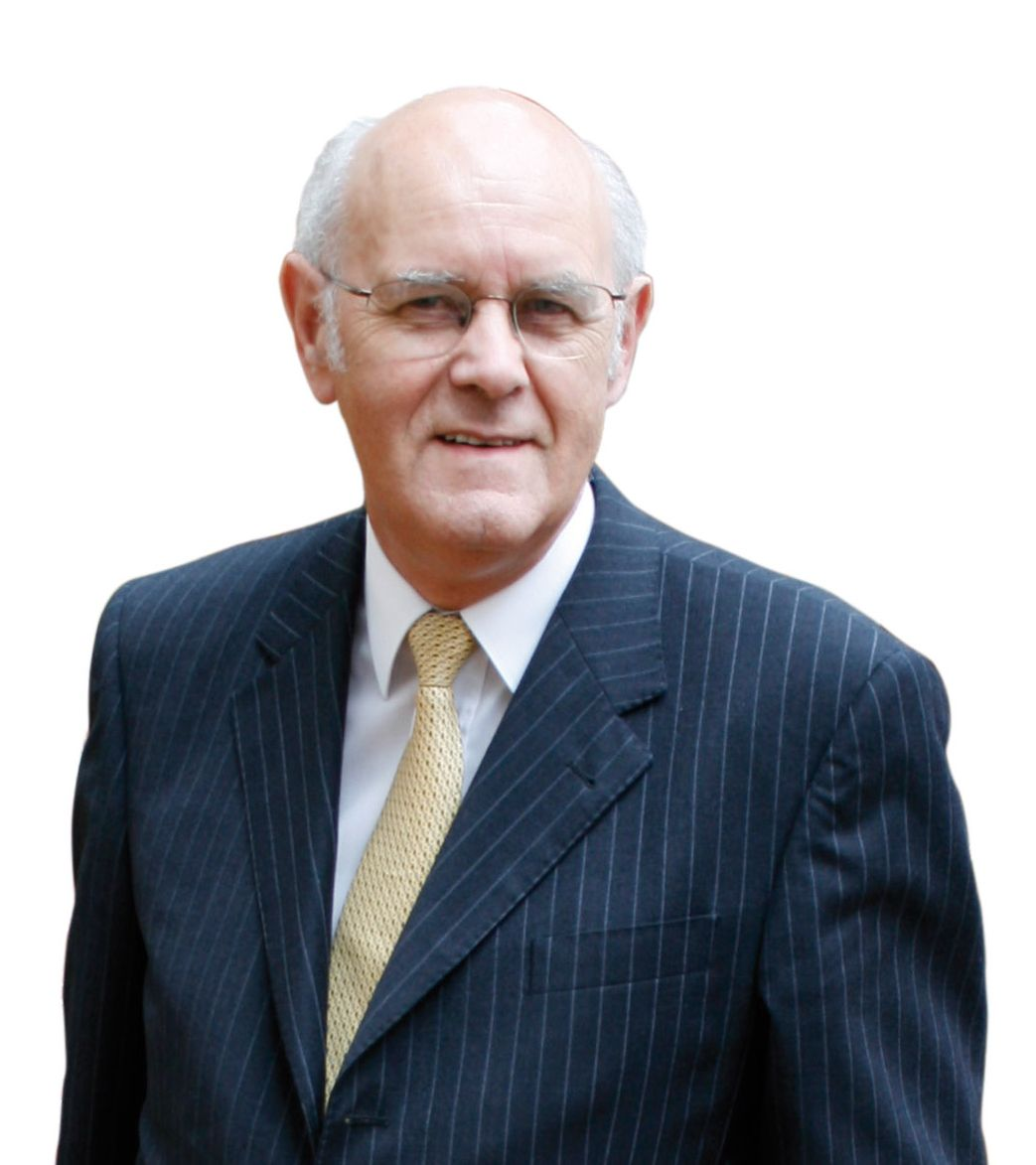
	First party	Second party	Third party
Leader	Albert Bore	Mike Whitby	Paul Tilsley
Party	Labour	Conservative	Liberal Democrats
Leader's seat	Ladywood	Harborne	Sheldon
Seats won	77	28	15
Seat change	▲20	▼11	▼9
Popular vote	109,841	51,490	34,707
Percentage	51%	24%	14%
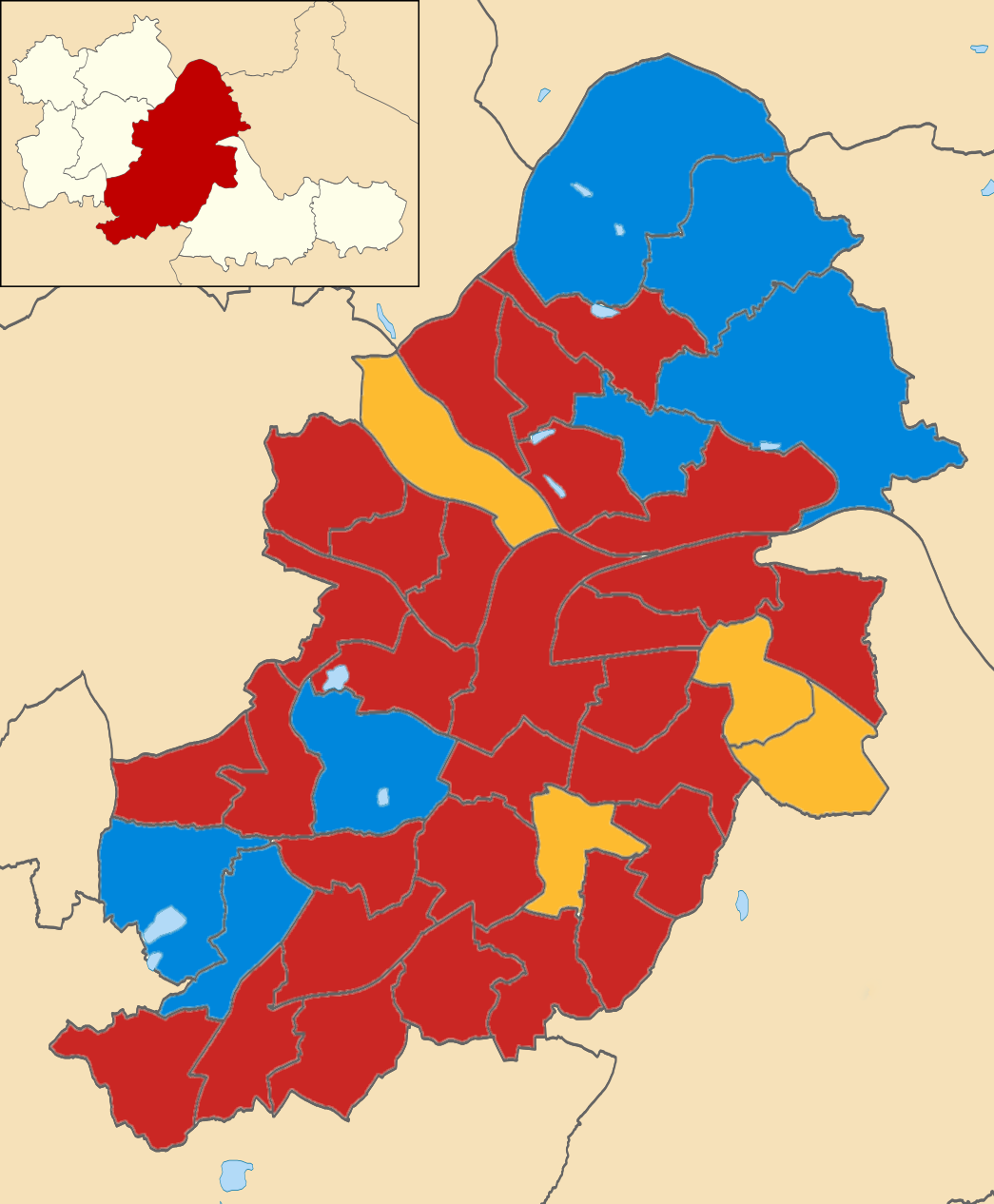
- 2012 local election results in Birmingham.
Council control before election
Mike Whitby
No Overall Control
Council control after election
Albert Bore
Labour

Elections to Birmingham City Council in England were held on 3 May 2012 on the same day as other 2012 United Kingdom local elections. One third of the council was up for election and the Labour Party gained overall control of the council from No Overall Control.

These election results are directly comparable with the corresponding elections held in 2008.

== Election summary ==
Birmingham local election result 2012
Party	Seats	Gains	Losses	Net gain/loss	Seats %	Votes %	Votes	+/−
Labour	77			▲20		51	109,841	
Conservative	28			▼11		24	51,490	
Liberal Democrats	15			▼9		14	34,707	
Green	0			0	0.0	4.5	9,703	
UKIP	0			0	0.0	2.3	4,915	
BNP	0			0	0.0	1.5	3,306	
Socialist Labour	0			0	0.0		429	
Communities Against the Cuts	0			0	0.0		385	
English Democrat	0			0	0.0		226	
National Front	0			0	0.0		143	
Social Democratic Party (UK, 1990 – present)	0			0	0.0		64	
TUSC	0			0	0.0		58	
Independent	0			0	0.0		withdrawn	

== Resulting Political Composition ==
Party	Seats			Council Composition 3 May 2012
Party	2010	2011	2012	Council Composition 3 May 2012
Labour	41	57	77	
Conservative	45	39	28	
Liberal Democrats	31	24	15	

== Ward results ==
Acocks Green ward
Party	Candidate	Votes	%	±%
Labour	John O'Shea	2,170	42.7%	
Liberal Democrats	Roger Harmer	1,993	39.2%	
UKIP	Chris Whitehouse	269	5.3%	
Conservative	Joe Edginton	247	4.9%	
Green	Amanda Baker	168	3.3%	
BNP	Stella Taylor	166	3.3%	
TUSC	Ben Rubery	58	1.1%	
Social Democratic Party (UK, 1990 – present)	Alan Ware	15	0.3%	
Majority				
Turnout				

Aston ward
Party	Candidate	Votes	%	±%
Labour	Nagina Kauser	3,567	50.5%	
Liberal Democrats	Ayoub Khan	3,123	44.2%	
Independent	Abdusalam bin Smith	145	2.1%	
Conservative	Ian Colpman	138	2.0%	
Green	Ankaret Harmer	94	1.3%	
Majority				
Turnout				

Bartley Green ward
Party	Candidate	Votes	%	±%
Conservative	Vivienne Barton	2,716	56.2%	
Labour	Nora Young	1,639	33.9%	
BNP	John Grainger	235	4.9%	
Green	Adam Round	155	3.2%	
Liberal Democrats	Julia Garrett	87	1.8%	
Majority				
Turnout				

Billesley ward
Party	Candidate	Votes	%	±%
Labour	Phil Davies	2,586	49.7%	
Conservative	Len Gregory	1,749	33.6%	
UKIP	Adrian Duffen	287	5.5%	
BNP	Paul Hickman	237	4.6%	
Green	Anna Masters	191	3.7%	
Liberal Democrats	Simone Rudge-Beattie	156	3.0%	
Majority				
Turnout				

Bordesley Green ward
Party	Candidate	Votes	%	±%
Labour	Uzma Ahmed	5,042	61.2%	
Liberal Democrats	Shaukat Ali Khan	2,701	32.8%	
Green	Huw Davies	180	2.3%	
Conservative	Andrew Hardie	176	2.1%	
UKIP	Dale Wynde	144	1.7%	
Majority				
Turnout				

Bournville ward
Party	Candidate	Votes	%	±%
Labour	Phil Walking	3,185	44.3%	
Conservative	Nigel Dawkins	2,878	40.0%	
Green	Joe Rooney	417	5.8%	
Liberal Democrats	Tim Stimpson	272	3.8%	
Communities Against the Cuts	Lynne Habermacher	256	3.6%	
BNP	Darren Allen	188	2.6%	
Majority				
Turnout				
		Swing		

Brandwood ward
Party	Candidate	Votes	%	±%
Labour	Eva Phillips	3,360	54.3%	
Conservative	Neville Summerfield	1,978	31.9%	
UKIP	James Wood	335	5.4%	
Green	Jane Bradshaw	317	5.1%	
Liberal Democrats	Chris Burgess	202	3.3%	
Independent	Karen Osborne	withdrawn		
Majority				
Turnout				

Edgbaston ward
Party	Candidate	Votes	%	±%
Conservative	Deirdre Alden	2,240	46.2%	
Labour	Dennis Minnis	1,999	41.3%	
Green	Bill van Marle	279	5.8%	
Liberal Democrats	Colin Green	196	4.0%	
UKIP	David Bridges	131	2.7%	
Majority				
Turnout				

Erdington ward
Party	Candidate	Votes	%	±%
Conservative	Bob Beauchamp	2,300	50.3	
Labour	Elaine Jackson	1,854	40.6	
Liberal Democrats	Philip Mills	114	2.5	
BNP	Morris Vincent	142	3.1	
Green	David Williams	161	3.5	
Majority		446	9.7	
Turnout				

Hall Green ward
Party	Candidate	Votes	%	±%
Labour	Barry Bowles	2,613	41.2	
Conservative	Bob Harvey	2,127	33.6	
Liberal Democrats	Paul Smith	1,302	20.6	
Green	Charles Alldrick	294	4.6	
Majority				
Turnout				

Handsworth Wood ward
Party	Candidate	Votes	%	±%
Labour	Gurdial Atwal	3,779	65.5	
Conservative	Amrik Singh Sahota	1,199	20.8	
Socialist Labour	John Tyrrell	350	6.0	
Green	Hugh Williams	300	5.2	
Liberal Democrats	Malti Dhiman	142	2.5	
Majority		1,780	44.7	
Turnout				

Harborne ward
Party	Candidate	Votes	%	±%
Labour	Elaine Williams	3,264	50.2	
Conservative	John Alden	2,441	37.5	
Green	Phil Simpson	394	6.1	
UKIP	Keith Rowe	233	3.6	
Liberal Democrats	Alaine Christian	178	2.6	
Majority		823	17.7	
Turnout				

Hodge Hill ward
Party	Candidate	Votes	%	±%
Labour Co-op	Anita Ward	3,345	65.7	
Liberal Democrats	Gwyn Neilly	836	16.4	
Conservative	Derek Johnson	384	7.5	
UKIP	John Butler	270	5.3	
BNP	David Campion	139	2.7	
Green	Anne Margaret Okole	102	2.0	
Social Democratic Party (UK, 1990 – present)	Peter Johnson	14	0.3	
Majority		2,509	49.3	
Turnout				

Kings Norton ward
Party	Candidate	Votes	%	±%
Labour	Valerie Seabright	2,047	43.7	
Conservative	Barbara Wood	1,764	37.7	
UKIP	Peter Hughes	297	6.3	
Liberal Democrats	Claire Berwick	170	3.6	
BNP	Frances Waldron	145	3.1	
Green	Ged Hickman	131	2.8	
Communities Against the Cuts	Christopher Hughes	129	2.7	
Majority		283	6.0	
Turnout				

Kingstanding ward
Party	Candidate	Votes	%	±%
Labour	Catharine Grundy	2,014	49.6	
Conservative	Gary Sambrook	1,609	39.7	
BNP	Lynette Orton	213	5.3	
Green	Tony O'Sullivan	106	2.6	
Liberal Democrats	Graham Lippiatt	80	2.0	
National Front	Terry Williams	34	0.8	
Majority		405	9.9	
Turnout				

Ladywood ward
Party	Candidate	Votes	%	±%
Labour	Kath Hartley	2,174		
Conservative	Parveen Hassan	474		
Green	Hazel Clawley	268		
UKIP	Matthew Roach	215		
Liberal Democrats	Cabdulqaadir Ruumi	185		
Majority				
Turnout				

Longbridge ward
Party	Candidate	Votes	%	±%
Labour	Jess Phillips	2,069	46.9%	
Conservative	Ken Wood	1,536	34.8%	
UKIP	Graeme Carruthers	305	6.9%	
Green	Susan Pearce	168	3.8%	
BNP	Christopher Pritchard	173	3.9%	
Liberal Democrats	Andy Thompson	163	3.7%	
Majority		533	12.1%	
Turnout				

Lozells And East Handsworth ward
Party	Candidate	Votes	%	±%
Labour	Mahmood Hussain	4,889		
Conservative	Ravi Chumber	400		
Green	Emma Round	275		
Liberal Democrats	Sharon Trench	187		
Majority				
Turnout				

Moseley And Kings Heath ward
Party	Candidate	Votes	%	±%
Labour	Lisa Trickett	3,432		
Liberal Democrats	Martin Mullaney	2,137		
Green	William Lilley	594		
Conservative	John Turner	472		
UKIP	Alan Blumenthal	199		
Majority				
Turnout				

Nechells ward
Party	Candidate	Votes	%	±%
Labour	Tahir Ali	2,831		
Liberal Democrats	Shazad Iqbal	483		
Conservative	Aaron Powell	282		
Green	Janet Assheton	265		
Majority				
Turnout				

Northfield ward
Party	Candidate	Votes	%	±%
Labour	Brett O'Reilly	2,238		
Conservative	Les Lawrence	2,177		
UKIP	John Borthwick	353		
Liberal Democrats	Andy Moles	201		
BNP	Howard Hamilton	201		
Green	Kirsty Axe	179		
Majority				
Turnout				

Oscott ward
Party	Candidate	Votes	%	±%
Labour	Tristan Chatfield	2,353		
Conservative	Graham Green	1,456		
English Democrat	Chris Newey	226		
BNP	Michael Jones	225		
Green	Harry Eyles	153		
Liberal Democrats	Nick Jolliffe	132		
Majority				
Turnout		5,280	29.2	

Perry Barr ward
Party	Candidate	Votes	%	±%
Liberal Democrats	Raymond Hassall	2,587		
Labour	Sarfraiz Hussain	2,054		
Conservative	Sukhwinder Singh Sungu	309		
Green	Colin Marriott	262		
Majority				
Turnout				

Quinton ward
Party	Candidate	Votes	%	±%
Labour	Caroline Badley	3,362		
Conservative	Peter Smallbone	2,226		
Green	Peter Beck	255		
BNP	James Harvey	200		
Liberal Democrats	Ian Garrett	141		
Majority				
Turnout				

Selly Oak ward
Party	Candidate	Votes	%	±%
Labour Co-op	Karen McCarthy	1,833		
Liberal Democrats	Alistair Dow	1,332		
Conservative	Monica Hardle	509		
Green	David Toke	271		
UKIP	Robin Norton	179		
Majority				
Turnout				

Shard End ward
Party	Candidate	Votes	%	±%
Labour	Marjorie Bridle	2,038		
UKIP	Iain Roden	609		
Conservative	Jessie Holland	396		
BNP	Kevin McHugh	222		
Green	Tracie Hammond	124		
National Front	Mark Neary	38		
Majority				
Turnout				

Sheldon ward
Party	Candidate	Votes	%	±%
Liberal Democrats	Sue Anderson	2,737		
Labour	Christopher Dalton	957		
UKIP	Richard Allen	274		
BNP	Ian Starks	191		
Conservative	Amil Khan	168		
Green	Alan Clawley	77		
National Front	Paul Morris	28		
Social Democratic Party (UK, 1990 – present)	Joylan Ware	17		
Majority				
Turnout				

Soho ward
Party	Candidate	Votes	%	±%
Labour	Chaman Lal	3,828		
Liberal Democrats	Mohammed Usman	507		
Conservative	Manjeet Kumari-Lal	375		
Green	Steve Austin	243		
Socialist Labour	Shangara Singh Bhatoe	79		
Majority				
Turnout				

South Yardley ward
Party	Candidate	Votes	%	±%
Labour	Zafar Iqbal	2,938		
Liberal Democrats	Daphne Gaved	2,315		
UKIP	Albert Duffen	237		
BNP	Timothy Glover	161		
Green	Rianne Ten Veen	152		
Conservative	Afzal Shah	152		
National Front	Adrian Davidson	43		
Majority				
Turnout				

Sparkbrook ward
Party	Candidate	Votes	%	±%
Labour	Mohammed Azim	5,164		
Green	Peter Tinsley	326		
Conservative	Hussein Hussein	298		
Liberal Democrats	Blair Kesseler	221		
Majority				
Turnout				

Springfield ward
Party	Candidate	Votes	%	±%
Liberal Democrats	Jerry Evans	3,278		
Labour	Nabila Bano	3,183		
Conservative	Abdul Rashid	519		
Green	Ian Jamieson	232		
Majority				
Turnout				

Stechford And Yardley North ward
Party	Candidate	Votes	%	±%
Liberal Democrats	Neil Eustace	2,584		
Labour	Lorraine Owen	1,690		
UKIP	Graham Duffen	393		
Conservative	Robert Clark	218		
BNP	Dean Edwards	197		
Green	Eric Fairclough	89		
Social Democratic Party (UK, 1990 – present)	Joyce Ware	18		
Majority				
Turnout				

Stockland Green ward
Party	Candidate	Votes	%	±%
Labour	Josh Jones	2,457		
Conservative	Matt Bennett	1,527		
Green	Elly Stanton	234		
Liberal Democrats	Franklyn Aaron	170		
Majority				
Turnout				

Sutton Four Oaks ward
Party	Candidate	Votes	%	±%
Conservative	Meirion Jenkins	3,699		
Labour	Manish Puri	869		
Green	David Ratcliff	638		
Liberal Democrats	Hubert Duffy	427		
Majority				
Turnout				

Sutton New Hall ward
Party	Candidate	Votes	%	±%
Conservative	Guy Roberts	2,524		
Labour	Ian Brindley	1,599		
Green	Samantha Winsper	336		
Liberal Democrats	Lynn Williams	249		
Majority				
Turnout				

Sutton Trinity ward
Party	Candidate	Votes	%	±%
Conservative	Philip Parkin	2,639		
Labour	Roger Barley	1,541		
Green	Ulla Grant	421		
Liberal Democrats	Sally Lippiatt	415		
Majority				
Turnout				

Sutton Vesey ward
Party	Candidate	Votes	%	±%
Labour	Robert Pocock	3,231		
Conservative	Malcolm Cornish	2,426		
Green	James Orford	285		
Liberal Democrats	Gareth Hardy	241		
Majority				
Turnout				

Tyburn ward
Party	Candidate	Votes	%	±%
Labour Co-op	Mick Brown	1,924		
Liberal Democrats	Ann Holtom	982		
Conservative	Doug Pullen	467		
BNP	Peter Hickman	248		
Green	Lee Moore	144		
Majority				
Turnout				

Washwood Heath ward
Party	Candidate	Votes	%	±%
Labour	Mariam Khan	6,608		
Liberal Democrats	Mohammad Azam	1,049		
UKIP	Arthur Davis	185		
Green	John Bentley	184		
Conservative	Allister du Plessis	178		
Majority				
Turnout				

Weoley ward
Party	Candidate	Votes	%	±%
Conservative	Eddie Freeman	2,117		
Labour	Steve Booton	2,115		
Green	Ross Axe	239		
Liberal Democrats	Steven Haynes	216		
BNP	Leslie Orton	213		
Majority				
Turnout				
