= 2010 Birmingham City Council election =

2010 UK local government election

- 6 May 2010

One third (40) seats to Birmingham City Council 61 seats needed for a majority
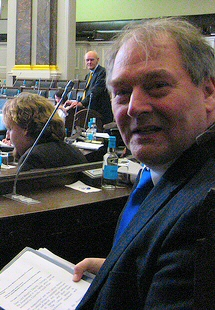

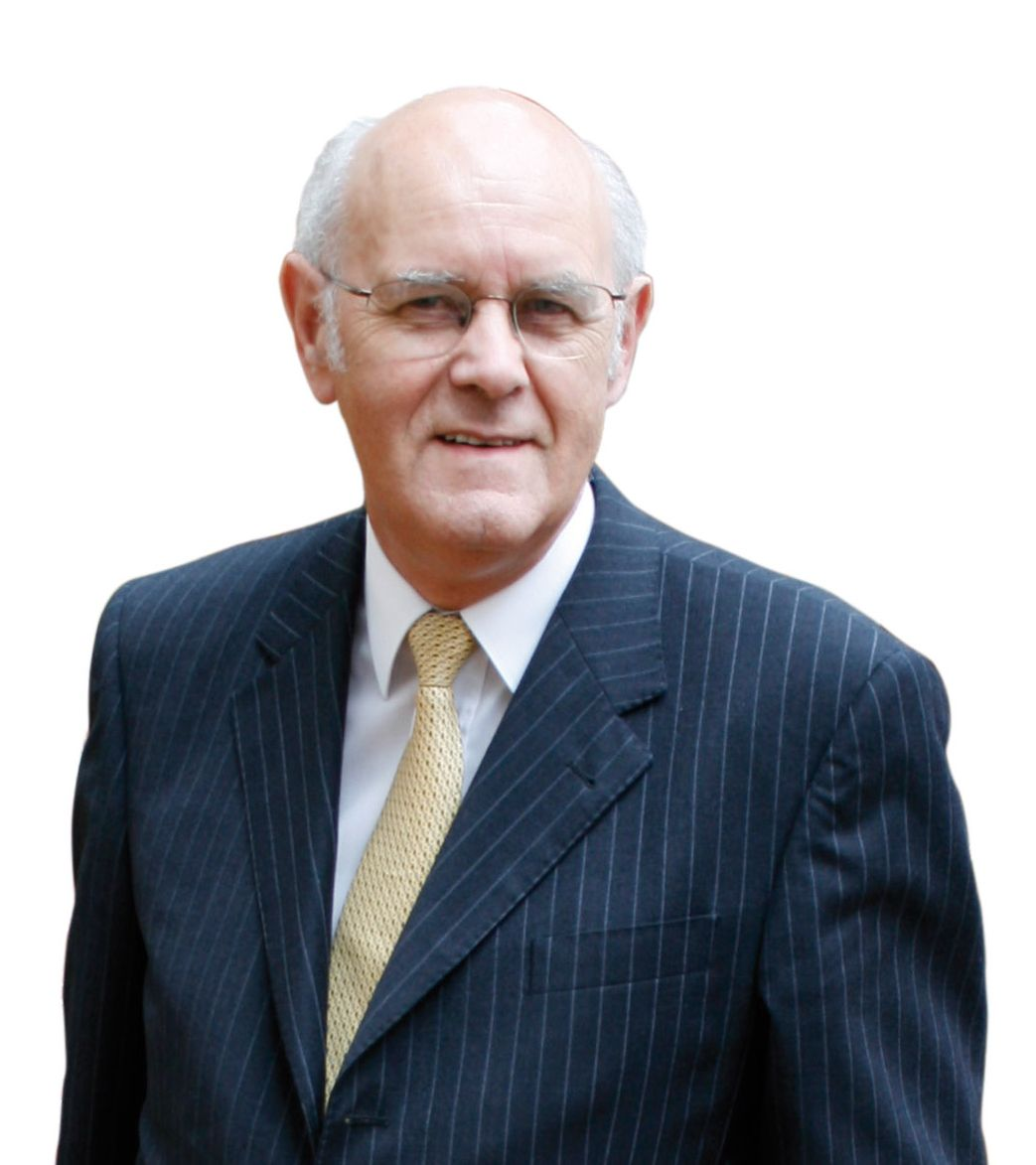
	First party	Second party	Third party
Leader	Mike Whitby	Albert Bore	Paul Tilsley
Party	Conservative	Labour	Liberal Democrats
Leader's seat	Harborne	Ladywood	Sheldon
Seats won	45	41	31
Seat change	▼4	▲5	▼1
Popular vote	115,742	156,951	104,902
Percentage	27.1%	36.8%	24.6%
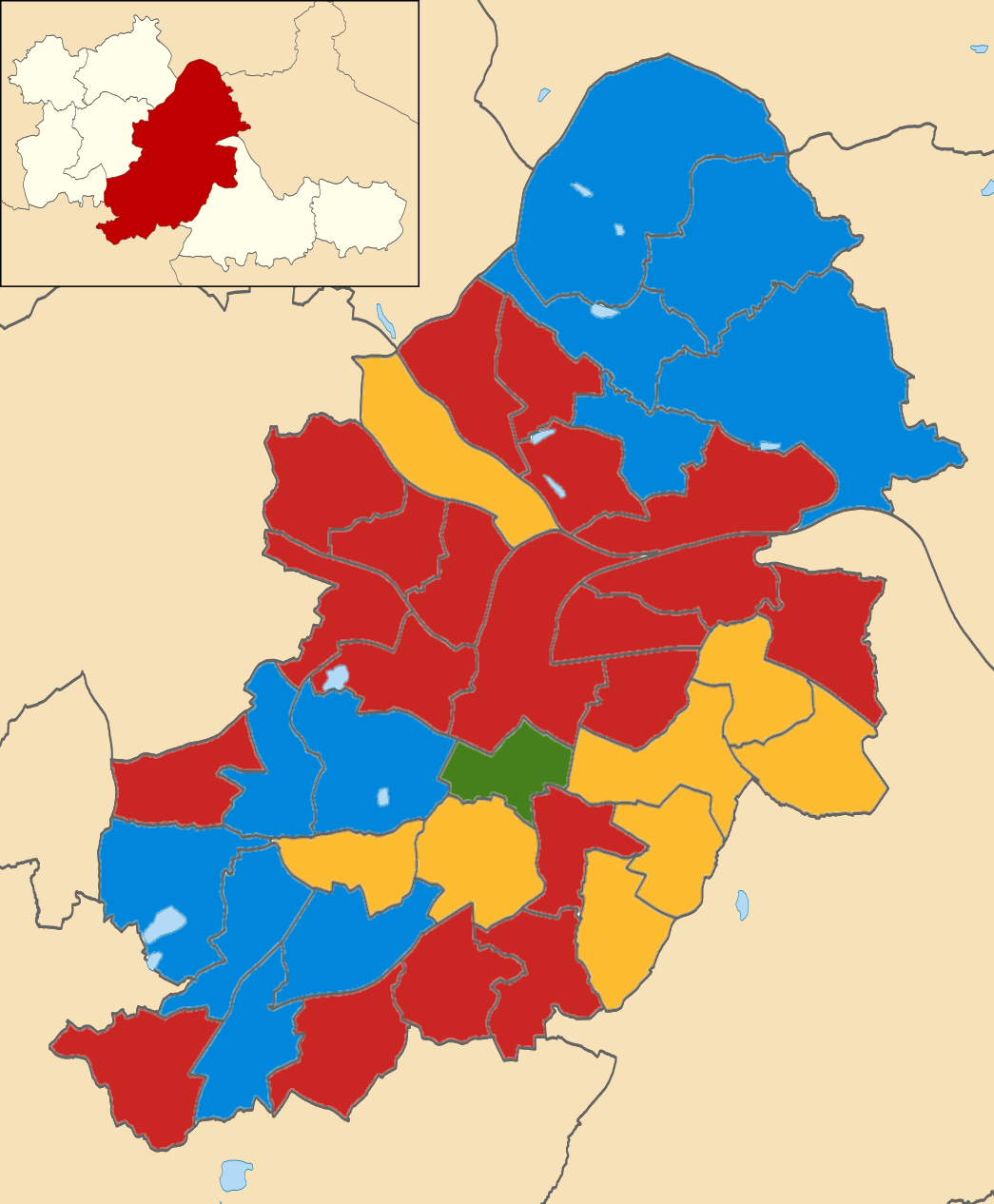
- 2010 local election results in Birmingham.
Council control before election
No Overall Control
Council control after election
No Overall Control

The 2010 Birmingham City Council Election took place on 6 May 2010 to elect members of Birmingham City Council in the West Midlands, England. One third of the council was up for election, one seat in each of the city's 40 council wards, with the election taking place at the same time as the general election.

== Campaign ==
Before the election the council was under no overall control with the composition of the council being Conservative 49, Labour 36, Liberal Democrat 32 and Respect 3. The Conservatives and Liberal Democrats ran the council in coalition, while Labour formed the main opposition. 40 seats were up for election with 16 Conservative, 15 Labour, 9 Liberal Democrat and 1 Respect seats being defended.

== Election results ==
Birmingham local election result 2010
Party	Seats	Gains	Losses	Net gain/loss	Seats %	Votes %	Votes	+/−
Conservative	45	0	▼4	▼4	37.5	27.1	115,742	
Labour	41	▲5	0	▲5	34.2	36.8	156,951	
Liberal Democrats	31	0	▼1	▼1	25.8	24.6	104,902	
Respect	3	0	0	0	2.5	2.5	10,646	
BNP	0	Steady	Steady	Steady	0	4.8	20,578	
Green	0	Steady	Steady	Steady	0	2.5	10,651	
UKIP	0	Steady	Steady	Steady	0	0.7	3,136	
Independent	0	Steady	Steady	Steady	0	0.5	2,199	
National Front	0	Steady	Steady	Steady	0	0.17	727	
Christian Peoples Alliance	0	Steady	Steady	Steady	0	0.08	321	
SDP	0	Steady	Steady	Steady	0	0.07	294	
English Democrat	0	Steady	Steady	Steady	0	0.06	272	

== Ward results ==
Birmingham Council election, 2010: Acocks Green Electorate 19,721 Turnout 53.0%,
Party	Candidate	Votes	%	±%
Liberal Democrats	Iain David Bowen	4,374	41.9	▼9.6
Labour	Stewart Charles Stacey	3,400	32.5	▲11.4
Conservative	Joe Edginton	1,416	13.6	▲2.4
BNP	Carl Brisker	686	6.6	−5.0
Green	Amanda Baker	280	2.7	▼1.7
UKIP	John Butler	233	2.2	▲2.2
SDP	Alan Ware	21	0.2	+0.2
Majority		974	9.4	−21.0
Liberal Democrats hold		Swing		

Birmingham Council election, 2010: Aston Electorate 19,877
Party	Candidate	Votes	%	±%
Labour	Ziaul Islam	5,683	54.8	▲21.1
Liberal Democrats	Sham Uddin	3,360	32.4	▼6.2
Conservative	Gareth Moore	564	5.4	▲2.5
Independent	Abdusalam Smith	321	3.1	▲3.1
Green	Alan Bale	242	2.3	▲0.6
Majority		2,323	22.4	
Turnout			53.1	
Labour hold		Swing		

Birmingham Council election, 2010: Bartley Green
Party	Candidate	Votes	%	±%
Conservative	Bruce Lines	4,508	45.0	
Labour	Caroline Badley	3,290	32.9	
Liberal Democrats	Julia Garrett	1,267	12.8	
BNP	Trevor Sidney Lloyd	807	8.0	
Green	Alan Clawley	180	1.4	
Majority				
Turnout		10,052	56.9	

Birmingham Council election, 2010: Billesley
Party	Candidate	Votes	%	±%
Labour	Alexander Buchanan	4,043		
Conservative	Susan Axford	3,832		
Liberal Democrats	Philip Banting	1,692		
BNP	Howard Hamilton	1,235		
Green	John Bentley	229		
Independent	Lol Stait	149		
Majority				
Turnout			58.8	

Birmingham Council election, 2010: Bordesley Green
Party	Candidate	Votes	%	±%
Labour	Mohammed Aikhlaq	5,486		
Liberal Democrats	Zaker Choudhry	4,358		
Conservative	Aqil Zada	896		
Green	Hazel Clawley	376		
UKIP	Elaine Duffen	299		
Majority				
Turnout				

Birmingham Council election, 2010: Bournville
Party	Candidate	Votes	%	±%
Conservative	Rob Sealey	4,781		
Labour Co-op	Nathan Matthew	4,077		
Liberal Democrats	Tim Stimpson	2,844		
Green	Charlene Bale	752		
BNP	Paul Oakley	670		
Majority				
Turnout			67.9	

Birmingham Council election, 2010: Brandwood
Party	Candidate	Votes	%	±%
Labour	Mike Leddy	4,706		
Conservative	Derek Johnson	3,772		
Liberal Democrats	Brian Peace	1,929		
BNP	Lynette Orton	731		
Green	Steven Austin	347		
CPA	Morag Marinoni	108		
Majority				
Turnout			62.9	

Birmingham Council election, 2010: Edgbaston
Party	Candidate	Votes	%	±%
Conservative	Fergus David Robinson	3,832	40.4	
Labour	Niki Constantinou	3,036	32.0	
Liberal Democrats	Rob Hunter	2,053	21.7	
Green	Ed Moss	378		
BNP	Elizabeth Wainwright	181		
Majority				
Turnout			51.8	

Birmingham Council election, 2010: Erdington
Party	Candidate	Votes	%	±%
Conservative	Robert Alden	4,539		
Labour	Mark McKenzie	2,990		
Liberal Democrats	Philip Mills	1,265		
BNP	Amanda Offord	512		
CPA	Michael Warom	133		
Majority				
Turnout			57.3	

Birmingham Council election, 2010: Hall Green
Party	Candidate	Votes	%	±%
Liberal Democrats	Paula Smith	4,691		
Conservative	Bob Harvey	3,336		
Labour	Rod Dungate	2,882		
Respect	Rana Nazir	1,136		
BNP	Brian Frank Maund	538		
Green	Johnny Rafter	225		
Majority				
Turnout				

Birmingham Council election, 2010: Handsworth Wood
Party	Candidate	Votes	%	±%
Labour	Narinder Kooner	6,741		
Liberal Democrats	Baljinder Kaur	2,080		
Conservative	Mahinderpal Singh	1,953		
Green	Elizabeth Sharman	504		
Majority				
Turnout				

Birmingham Council election, 2010: Harborne
Party	Candidate	Votes	%	±%
Conservative	Michael John Whitby	4,640	42.0	
Labour	James McKay	3,766	34.1	
Liberal Democrats	Mohammed Sagier	1,609	14.6	
Green	Phil Simpson	744		
BNP	Roy Bevington	289		
Majority				
Turnout				

Birmingham Council election, 2010: Hodge Hill
Party	Candidate	Votes	%	±%
Labour	Tim Evans	4,336		
Liberal Democrats	Hakil Ahmed	2,830		
Conservative	Arshed Zaman	1,598		
BNP	David Campion	875		
UKIP	Waheed Rafiq	214		
SDP	Peter Johnson	192		
Green	Anna Masters	154		
Majority				
Turnout				

Birmingham Council election, 2010: Kings Norton
Party	Candidate	Votes	%	±%
Labour Co-op	Steve Bedser	3,710		
Conservative	Jacquie Fear	3,531		
Liberal Democrats	Nicholas Roberts	1,548		
BNP	Malcolm Doughty	541		
Green	Ged Hickman	302		
Majority				
Turnout				

Birmingham Council election, 2010: Kingstanding
Party	Candidate	Votes	%	±%
Labour	Des Hughes	3,372		
Conservative	Gary Sambrook	2,792		
BNP	Kevin McHugh	891		
Liberal Democrats	Hubert Duffy	866		
National Front	Terry Williams	160		
Green	Lee Moore	103		
Majority				
Turnout				

Birmingham Council election, 2010: Ladywood
Party	Candidate	Votes	%	±%
Labour	Carl Rice	3,504		
Liberal Democrats	David Nikel	2,338		
Conservative	Sharon Pennant	1,684		
Green	James Robertson	378		
Majority				
Turnout				

Birmingham Council election, 2010: Longbridge
Party	Candidate	Votes	%	±%
Labour	Ian Cruise	3,769		
Conservative	Sue Barton	3,652		
Liberal Democrats	Kevin Hannon	1,601		
BNP	Michael Bell	906		
Green	Joel Large	175		
English Democrat	Vincent Schittone	174		
Majority				
Turnout				

Birmingham Council election, 2010: Lozells and East Handsworth
Party	Candidate	Votes	%	±%
Labour	Hendrina Quinnen	6,362		
Liberal Democrats	Mehnaz Khan	1,704		
Conservative	Raja Khan	1,646		
Independent	Abdul Azad	308		
Green	Kirsty Tedstone	301		
Majority				
Turnout				

Birmingham Council election, 2010: Moseley and Kings Heath
Party	Candidate	Votes	%	±%
Liberal Democrats	Ernie Hendricks	4,300		
Labour	Martin Welds	4,061		
Conservative	Maura Judges	1,888		
Respect	Tahir Rehman	1,420		
Green	William Lilley	697		
BNP	Brian Haynes	256		
Majority				
Turnout				

Birmingham Council election, 2010: Nechells
Party	Candidate	Votes	%	±%
Labour	Chauhdry Abdul Rashid	4,402		
Conservative	Mohammed Shahban	1,203		
Liberal Democrats	Shazad Iqbal	1,197		
Independent	Mohamed Sharif	534		
Green	Janet Assheton	478		
Majority				
Turnout				

Birmingham Council election, 2010: Northfield
Party	Candidate	Votes	%	±%
Conservative	Randal Brew	4,344		
Labour Co-op	Andrew Coulson	3,631		
Liberal Democrats	Andrew Moles	1,872		
BNP	Leslie Orton	993		
UKIP	John Borthwick	526		
Green	Tracie Hammond	215		
Majority				
Turnout				

Birmingham Council election, 2010: Oscott
Party	Candidate	Votes	%	±%
Labour	Barbara Dring	4,048		
Conservative	Maria Green	3,457		
Liberal Democrats	Nick Jolliffe	1,501		
BNP	Richard Morris	992		
National Front	Keith Axon	241		
Green	Harry Eyles	194		
Majority				
Turnout				

Birmingham Council election, 2010: Perry Barr
Party	Candidate	Votes	%	±%
Liberal Democrats	Karen Hamilton	4,163		
Labour	Brian Rhoden	3,307		
Conservative	Paul Burke	1,660		
BNP	Susan Morris	620		
Green	Karl MacNaughton	199		
Majority				
Turnout				

Birmingham Council election, 2010: Quinton
Party	Candidate	Votes	%	±%
Labour	Matthew Gregson	4,298	39.6	
Conservative	Jennifer James	4,142	38.2	
Liberal Democrats	Ian Garrett	1,413		
BNP	Stuart Bates	647		
Green	Peter Beck	354		
Majority				
Turnout				

Birmingham Council election, 2010: Selly Oak
Party	Candidate	Votes	%	±%
Liberal Democrats	David Radcliffe	4,536		
Labour	Brigid Jones	3,142		
Conservative	Andrew Hardie	2,214		
Green	James Burn	453		
BNP	Zane Patchell	230		
CPA	David Booth	80		
Majority				
Turnout				

Birmingham Council election, 2010: Shard End
Party	Candidate	Votes	%	±%
Labour	John Cotton	3,824		
Conservative	Jessie Holland	1,980		
BNP	Richard Lumby	1,177		
Liberal Democrats	Christopher Barber	1,110		
UKIP	Iain Roden	308		
National Front	Mark Neary	98		
English Democrat	Frank Parker	98		
Green	Colette Tedstone	70		
SDP	Joyce Ware	35		
Majority				
Turnout				

Birmingham Council election, 2010: Sheldon
Party	Candidate	Votes	%	±%
Liberal Democrats	Mike Ward	4,860		
Labour	Keith Culliford	1,920		
Conservative	Amil Khan	1,261		
BNP	Mark Wilson	831		
UKIP	Richard Allen	376		
National Front	Paul Morris	101		
Green	Samantha Winsper	79		
SDP	Joylan Ware	46		
Majority				
Turnout				

Birmingham Council election, 2010: Soho
Party	Candidate	Votes	%	±%
Labour	Dorothy Hargreaves	5,762		
Liberal Democrats	Mohammed Yaseen	2,641		
Conservative	Robert Higginson	957		
Green	Huw Davies	262		
Majority				
Turnout				

Birmingham Council election, 2010: South Yardley
Party	Candidate	Votes	%	±%
Liberal Democrats	David Willis	5,298		
Labour	Nawaz Ali	3,212		
Conservative	Pervez Akhtar	1,155		
BNP	Tanya Lumby	681		
UKIP	Albert Duffen	341		
Green	Helen Sauntson	187		
National Front	Adrian Davidson	127		
Majority				
Turnout				

Birmingham Council election, 2010: Sparkbrook
Party	Candidate	Votes	%	±%
Respect	Salma Yaqoob	5,119		
Labour	Mohammed Azim	3,878		
Conservative	Abdul Kadir	1,027		
Liberal Democrats	Naeem Qureshi	973		
Green	Charles Alldrick	349		
Majority				
Turnout				

Birmingham Council election, 2010: Springfield
Party	Candidate	Votes	%	±%
Labour	Mohammed Fazal	4,225		
Liberal Democrats	Mohammed Fiaz	3,362		
Respect	Saleem Younis	2,971		
Conservative	Tim Hasker	924		
BNP	Darren Allen	328		
Green	David Ratcliff	282		
Majority				
Turnout				

Birmingham Council election, 2010: Stechford and Yardley North
Party	Candidate	Votes	%	±%
Liberal Democrats	Carol Jones	4,834		
Labour	Gill Beddows	2,470		
Conservative	Robert Clark	1,353		
BNP	Ben Lumby	911		
UKIP	Graham Duffen	350		
Majority				
Turnout				

Birmingham Council election, 2010: Stockland Green
Party	Candidate	Votes	%	±%
Labour	Penny Holbrook	4,513		
Conservative	Simon Phillips	2,753		
Liberal Democrats	Franklyn Aaron	1,335		
BNP	Robert Offord	514		
Green	Elly Stanton	210		
Majority				
Turnout				

Birmingham Council election, 2010: Sutton Four Oaks
Party	Candidate	Votes	%	±%
Conservative	Anne Underwood	8,168		
Liberal Democrats	Richard Pearson	2,396		
Labour	Manish Puri	1,616		
BNP	Robert Grierson	652		
Green	Ben Bradley	430		
Majority				
Turnout				

Birmingham Council election, 2010: Sutton New Hall
Party	Candidate	Votes	%	±%
Conservative	James Bird	6,058		
Labour	Richard Costello	2,179		
Liberal Democrats	Robert Hardware	1,792		
Independent	Maureen Murphy	887		
BNP	Roger Turner	667		
Green	Jim Orford	184		
Majority				
Turnout				

Birmingham Council election, 2010: Sutton Trinity
Party	Candidate	Votes	%	±%
Conservative	Alberta Waddington	6,468		
Labour	Roger Barley	2,580		
Liberal Democrats	Maureen Parker	2,518		
BNP	Michael Jones	656		
Green	Joe Rooney	313		
Majority				
Turnout				

Birmingham Council election, 2010: Sutton Vesey
Party	Candidate	Votes	%	±%
Conservative	Alan Rudge	6,346		
Labour	Robert Pocock	3,798		
Liberal Democrats	Sidney Woods	2,526		
Majority				
Turnout				

Birmingham Council election, 2010: Tyburn
Party	Candidate	Votes	%	±%
Labour	Lynda Clinton	3,846		
Conservative	Tim Wilson	2,217		
Liberal Democrats	Trevor Holtom	1,911		
BNP	Graham Jones	688		
Majority				
Turnout				

Birmingham Council election, 2010: Washwood Heath
Party	Candidate	Votes	%	±%
Labour	Mohammed Idrees	7,511		
Liberal Democrats	Saleem Malik	3,057		
Conservative	Asifa Khan	998		
UKIP	Adrian David Duffen	489		
Majority				
Turnout				

Birmingham Council election, 2010: Weoley
Party	Candidate	Votes	%	±%
Conservative	Peter Osborn	3,639		
Labour	Christopher Hillcox	3,575		
Liberal Democrats	Trevor Sword	1,694		
BNP	Trevor Shearer	873		
Green	David Toke	277		
Majority				
Turnout				
