= 2008 Birmingham City Council election =

2008 UK local government election

- 1 May 2008

One third (40) seats to Birmingham City Council 61 seats needed for a majority
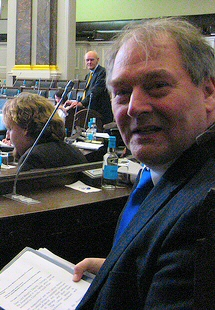

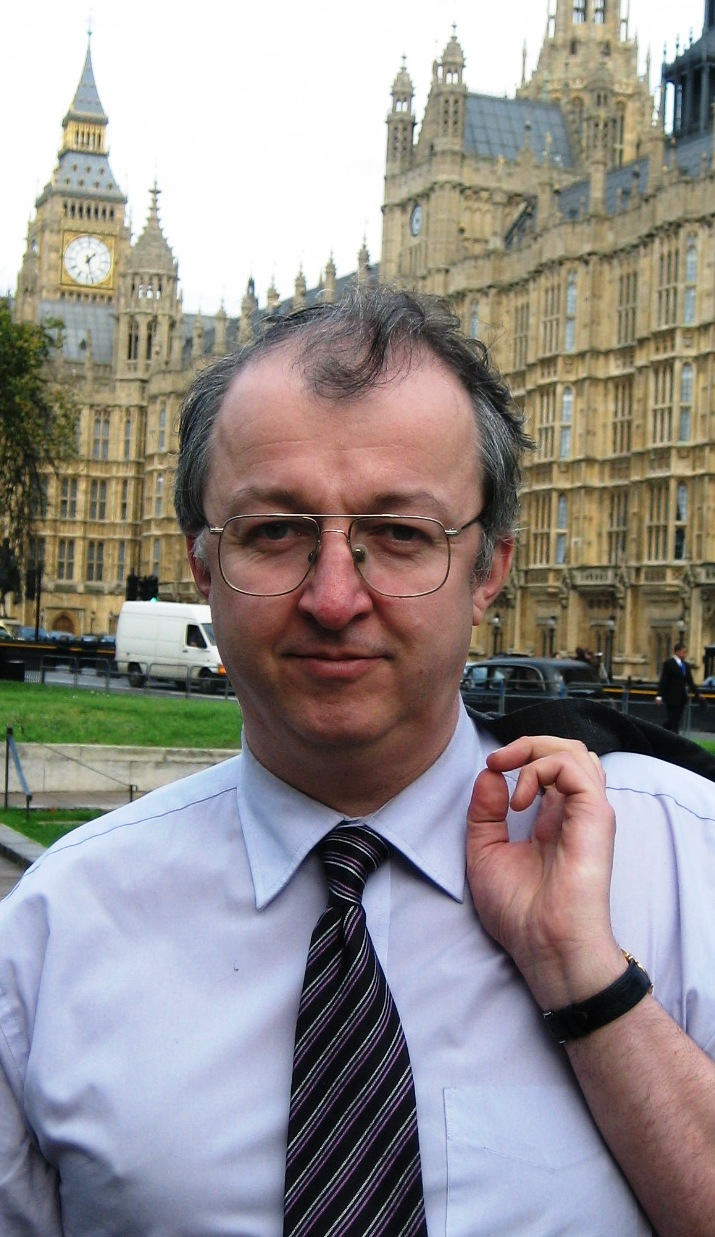
	First party	Second party	Third party
Leader	Mike Whitby	Albert Bore	John Hemming (did not seek re-election)
Party	Conservative	Labour	Liberal Democrats
Leader's seat	Harborne	Ladywood	South Yardley
Seats won	49	36	32
Seat change	▲6	▼6	Steady
Popular vote	68,190	67,922	52,454
Percentage	30.1%	30.0%	23.2%
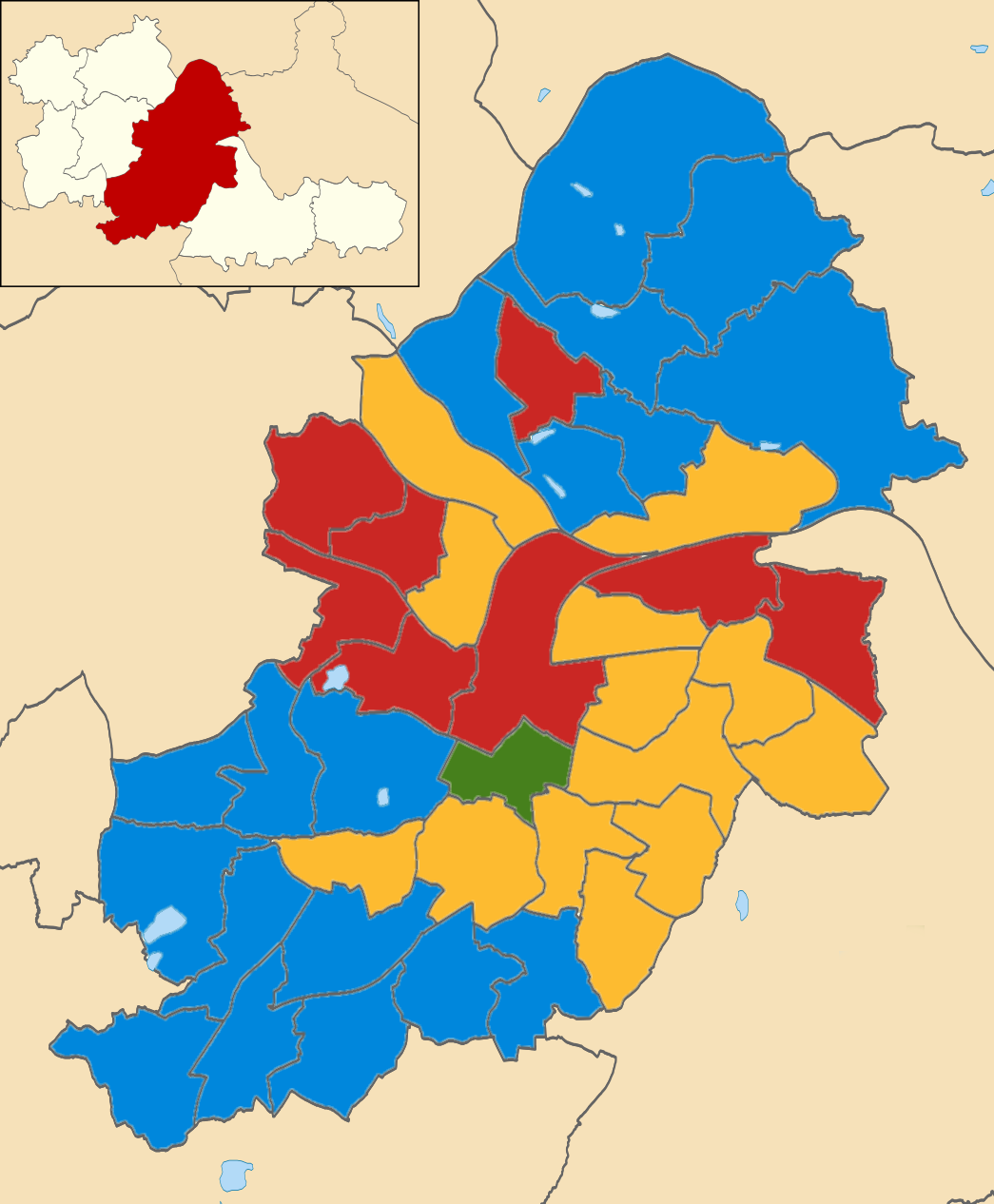
- 2008 local election results in Birmingham.
Council control before election
No Overall Control
Council control after election
No Overall Control

Elections to Birmingham City Council in England were held on 1 May 2008. One third of the council was up for election and the council stayed under no overall control as it had been since 2003.

230 candidates stood in the election for the 40 seats that were contested. Five parties contested every ward in Birmingham, the Conservatives, Labour, Liberal Democrats, British National Party and the Greens. Overall turnout across the city was 31.2%

The results saw the Conservative Party gain significantly, winning 6 seats from the Labour Party and Respect gain an independent seat. The Liberal Democrats were pleased to hold all their seats. As a result, the Conservative and Liberal Democrat ruling coalition increased their majority to hold 75% of the seats on the council. Both Conservatives and Liberal Democrats attributed their success to below inflation council tax rises and the national unpopularity of the Labour government.

== Election result ==
Birmingham local election result 2008
Party	Seats	Gains	Losses	Net gain/loss	Seats %	Votes %	Votes	+/−
Conservative	49	▲6	Steady	▲6	45.0	30.1	68,190	
Labour	36	Steady	▼6	▼6	20.0	30.0	67,922	
Liberal Democrats	32	Steady	Steady	Steady	32.5	23.2	52,454	
Respect	1	▲1	Steady	▲1	2.5	3.3	7,466	
BNP	0	Steady	Steady	Steady	0.0	7.4	16,806	
Green	0	Steady	Steady	Steady	0.0	4.1	9,251	
UKIP	0	Steady	Steady	Steady	0.0	0.7	1,688	
Community Independent	0	Steady	Steady	Steady	0.0	0.4	905	
Independent	0	Steady	▼1	▼1	0.0	0.4	852	
Socialist Labour	0	Steady	Steady	Steady	0.0	0.3	781	
National Front	0	Steady	Steady	Steady	0.0	0.1	265	

== Ward results ==
Acocks Green ward
Party	Candidate	Votes	%	±%
Liberal Democrats	Roger Harmer	2,743	51.5	
Labour	John O'Shea	1,125	21.1	
BNP	Tanya Whitehead	617	11.6	
Conservative	Emma Mahay	598	11.2	
Green	Amanda Baker	234	4.4	
Majority		1,618	30.4	
Turnout		5,317	27.4	
Liberal Democrats hold		Swing		

Aston ward
Party	Candidate	Votes	%	±%
Liberal Democrats	Ayoub Khan	2,769	38.6	
Labour	Amjad Hussain	2,417	33.7	
Respect	Abdul Aziz	1,406	19.6	
Conservative	Olam Nyeko	206	2.9	
Green	David Goley	118	1.7	
UKIP	Abdul Azad	113	1.6	
BNP	Alan Chamberlain	105	1.5	
Majority		352	4.9	
Turnout		7,134	38.0	
Liberal Democrats hold		Swing		

Bartley Green ward
Party	Candidate	Votes	%	±%
Conservative	Vivienne Barton	3,422	64.4	
Labour	Tom Guise	1,004	18.9	
BNP	Terrence Larkin	436	8.2	
Liberal Democrats	Julia Garrett	262	4.9	
Green	James Robertson	180	3.4	
Majority		2,418	45.5	
Turnout		5,304	30.1	
Conservative hold		Swing		

Billesley ward
Party	Candidate	Votes	%	±%
Conservative	Leonard Gregory	2,832	49.0	
Labour	Martin Welds	1,633	28.2	
BNP	Michael Bell	663	11.5	
Liberal Democrats	Robert Wagg	414	7.2	
Green	Catherine Manhood	236	4.1	
Majority		1,199	20.8	
Turnout		5,778	30.9	
Conservative hold		Swing		

Bordesley Green ward
Party	Candidate	Votes	%	±%
Liberal Democrats	Shaukat Khan	3,558	44.8	
Labour	Zafar Dad	3,427	43.1	
Conservative	Mary Storer	415	5.2	
BNP	Graham Jones	264	3.3	
Green	Hazel Clawley	248	3.1	
Majority		131	1.7	
Turnout		7,912	40.3	
Liberal Democrats hold		Swing		

Bournville ward
Party	Candidate	Votes	%	±%
Conservative	Nigel Dawkins	3,701	51.2	
Labour	Nathan Matthew	1,395	19.3	
Green	Joe Rooney	1,155	16.0	
Liberal Democrats	Victoria Marsom	592	8.2	
BNP	Steven Thomas	365	5.1	
Majority		2,306	31.9	
Turnout		7,208	37.5	
Conservative hold		Swing		

Brandwood ward
Party	Candidate	Votes	%	±%
Conservative	Neville Summerfield	2,864	46.0	
Labour	Susan Burfoot	1,937	31.1	
BNP	Lynette Orton	531	8.5	
Liberal Democrats	Brian Peace	472	7.6	
Green	Anna Masters	307	4.9	
Independent	Frank Chance	110	1.8	
Majority		927	14.9	
Turnout		6,221	34.8	
Conservative hold		Swing		

Edgbaston ward
Party	Candidate	Votes	%	±%
Conservative	Deirdre Alden	2,429	58.8	
Labour	Rod Dungate	912	22.1	
Liberal Democrats	Stuart Ritchie	372	9.0	
Green	Becki Cox	234	5.7	
BNP	Stuart Bates	90	2.2	
UKIP	Frank Jones	55	1.3	
Independent	Abhay Patekar	31	0.8	
Majority		1,517	36.7	
Turnout		4,123	26.1	
Conservative hold		Swing		

Erdington ward
Party	Candidate	Votes	%	±%
Conservative	Bob Beauchamp	2,678	56.0	
Labour	Christopher Hillcox	1,187	24.8	
Liberal Democrats	Philip Mills	330	6.9	
BNP	Simon Briscoe	317	6.6	
Green	Mark Oley	185	3.9	
UKIP	Umar Malik	82	1.7	
Majority		1,491	31.2	
Turnout		4,779	29.2	
Conservative gain from Labour		Swing		

Hall Green ward
Party	Candidate	Votes	%	±%
Liberal Democrats	Francis Wilkes	3,027	43.0	
Conservative	Bob Harvey	2,290	32.5	
Labour	Samuel Burden	1,123	15.9	
BNP	Wendy Lawrie	345	4.9	
Green	Sarah Minchin	164	2.3	
UKIP	John Ison	75	1.1	
Majority		737	10.5	
Turnout		7,024	37.6	
Liberal Democrats hold		Swing		

Handsworth Wood ward
Party	Candidate	Votes	%	±%
Labour	Gurdial Atwal	2,591	47.8	
Conservative	Mahindarpal Singh	1,129	20.8	
Socialist Labour	John Tyrrell	671	12.4	
Liberal Democrats	Nick Jolliffe	570	10.5	
Green	Eric Fairclough	231	4.3	
BNP	Paul Billingham	217	4.0	
Majority		1,462	27.0	
Turnout		5,409	28.3	
Labour hold		Swing		

Harborne ward
Party	Candidate	Votes	%	±%
Conservative	John Alden	2,717	49.5	
Labour	John Priest	1,389	25.3	
Green	Phil Simpson	691	12.6	
Liberal Democrats	Mohammed Sagier	405	7.4	
BNP	Howard Hamilton	193	3.5	
UKIP	Edward Siddall-Jones	80	1.5	
Majority		1,328	24.2	
Turnout		5,475	33.4	
Conservative hold		Swing		

Hodge Hill ward
Party	Candidate	Votes	%	±%
Labour Co-op	Anita Ward	2,375	40.7	
Liberal Democrats	Maureen Barnsley	1,852	31.7	
Conservative	Wilf Holland	757	13.0	
BNP	Denis Adams	526	9.0	
UKIP	Peter Johnson	176	3.0	
Green	Lydia Bradshaw	149	2.6	
Majority		523	9.0	
Turnout		5,835	33.7	
Labour hold		Swing		

Kings Norton ward
Party	Candidate	Votes	%	±%
Conservative	Geoffrey Sutton	2,345	47.3	
Labour	Amy Watson	1,492	30.1	
BNP	Malcolm Doughty	534	10.8	
Liberal Democrats	Neil Taylor	341	6.9	
Green	Steven Heywood	235	4.7	
Majority		853	17.2	
Turnout		4,947	29.6	
Conservative hold		Swing		

Kingstanding ward
Party	Candidate	Votes	%	±%
Labour	Catharine Grundy	1,376	36.7	
Conservative	Gary Sambrook	1,296	34.6	
BNP	David Campion	648	17.3	
Liberal Democrats	Hubert Duffy	254	6.8	
Green	Geoff Tapalu	105	2.8	
National Front	Terry Williams	54	1.4	
Majority		80	2.1	
Turnout		3,733	21.9	
Labour hold		Swing		

Ladywood ward
Party	Candidate	Votes	%	±%
Labour	Kathleen Hartley	1,467	50.1	
Conservative	Ransford Clarkson	719	24.6	
Liberal Democrats	Kenneth Jeffers	368	12.6	
Green	Damien Duff	196	6.7	
BNP	Lee Saunders	122	4.2	
UKIP	Mark Nattrass	44	1.5	
Majority		748	25.5	
Turnout		2,916	16.7	
Labour hold		Swing		

Longbridge ward
Party	Candidate	Votes	%	±%
Conservative	Ken Wood	1,977	39.4	
Labour	Steve Bedser	1,720	33.9	
BNP	Elizabeth Wainwright	716	14.1	
Liberal Democrats	Kevin Hannon	464	9.1	
Green	Bill Van Marle	168	3.3	
Majority		277	5.5	
Turnout		5,065	27.8	
Conservative gain from Labour		Swing		

Lozells And East Handsworth ward
Party	Candidate	Votes	%	±%
Labour	Don Brown	2,689	42.7	
Liberal Democrats	Sabirul Islam	1,725	27.4	
Independent	Ahsan Raghib	711	11.3	
Community Independent	Raja Khan	637	10.1	
Conservative	Zaweed Khan	284	4.5	
Green	Ankaret Harmer	159	2.5	
BNP	Zane Patchell	61	1.0	
Majority		964	15.3	
Turnout		6,266	33.9	
Labour hold		Swing		

Moseley And Kings Heath ward
Party	Candidate	Votes	%	±%
Liberal Democrats	Martin Mullaney	2,476	37.2	
Labour	Jane Howell	2,181	32.8	
Conservative	Maura Judges	963	14.5	
Green	Alan Clawley	433	6.5	
Respect	Ray Gaston	327	4.9	
BNP	Peter Lawrie	156	2.3	
UKIP	Alan Blumenthal	88	1.3	
Majority		295	4.4	
Turnout		6,624	35.8	
Liberal Democrats hold		Swing		

Nechells ward
Party	Candidate	Votes	%	±%
Labour	Tahir Ali	1,713	41.8	
Respect	Mushtaq Hussain	781	19.1	
Liberal Democrats	Nazir Hussain	710	17.3	
Conservative	Fitzroy Stevenson	429	10.5	
BNP	Darren Potter	211	5.2	
Green	Janet Assheton	191	4.7	
UKIP	Afshar Nazemi	39	1.0	
Majority		932	22.7	
Turnout		4,074	22.6	
Labour hold		Swing		

Northfield ward
Party	Candidate	Votes	%	±%
Conservative	Les Lawrence	2,804	47.1	
Labour	Andrew Coulson	1,496	25.1	
BNP	Leslie Orton	1,003	16.9	
Liberal Democrats	Andrew Moles	406	6.8	
Green	Susan Pearce	231	3.9	
Majority		1,308	22.0	
Turnout		5,940	31.7	
Conservative hold		Swing		

Oscott ward
Party	Candidate	Votes	%	±%
Conservative	Graham Green	2,196	41.6	
Labour	John Cotton	1,939	36.7	
BNP	Wilfred Palmer	690	13.1	
Liberal Democrats	James Hamilton	304	5.8	
Green	Harry Eyles	151	2.9	
Majority		257	4.9	
Turnout		5,280	29.2	
Conservative gain from Labour		Swing		

Perry Barr ward
Party	Candidate	Votes	%	±%
Liberal Democrats	Raymond Hassall	2,268	46.2	
Labour	Samuel Allen	1,190	24.2	
Conservative	Mark Haddon	843	17.2	
BNP	Susan Morris	443	9.0	
Green	Lester Mundy	160	3.3	
Majority		1,078	22.0	
Turnout		4,904	28.9	
Liberal Democrats hold		Swing		

Quinton ward
Party	Candidate	Votes	%	±%
Conservative	Peter Smallbone	2,903	44.8	
Labour	Caroline Badley	2,527	39.0	
BNP	Josephine Larkin	409	6.3	
Liberal Democrats	Ian Garrett	355	5.5	
Green	Peter Beck	275	4.2	
Majority		376	5.8	
Turnout		6,469	37.5	
Conservative gain from Labour		Swing		

Selly Oak ward
Party	Candidate	Votes	%	±%
Liberal Democrats	Alistair Dow	1,948	42.2	
Labour	David Williams	1,274	27.6	
Conservative	Andrew Hardie	889	19.3	
Green	Peter Tinsley	319	6.9	
BNP	Trevor Shearer	176	3.8	
Majority		674	24.6	
Turnout		4,606	25.0	
Liberal Democrats hold		Swing		

Shard End ward
Party	Candidate	Votes	%	±%
Labour	Marjorie Bridle	1,752	41.4	
Conservative	Jessie Holland	1,011	23.9	
BNP	Richard Lumby	999	23.6	
Liberal Democrats	Chris Barber	323	7.6	
Green	John Read	93	2.2	
National Front	Mark Neary	43	1.0	
Majority		741	17.5	
Turnout		4,221	23.3	
Labour hold		Swing		

Sheldon ward
Party	Candidate	Votes	%	±%
Liberal Democrats	Sue Anderson	3,224	60.5	
BNP	Robert Devenport	789	14.8	
Conservative	Hannah Axford	586	11.0	
Labour	Karen McCarthy	555	10.4	
Green	Elinor Stanton	92	1.7	
National Front	Paul Morris	75	1.4	
Majority		2,435	45.7	
Turnout		5,321	33.5	
Liberal Democrats hold		Swing		

Soho ward
Party	Candidate	Votes	%	±%
Labour	Chaman Lal	2,599	52.2	
Liberal Democrats	Morriam Jan	1.647	33.1	
Conservative	David Williams-Masinda	351	7.1	
Green	Huw Davies	147	3.0	
Socialist Labour	Sheera Johal	110	2.2	
BNP	Darren Allen	108	2.2	
Majority		952	19.1	
Turnout		4,962	29.1	
Labour hold		Swing		

South Yardley ward
Party	Candidate	Votes	%	±%
Liberal Democrats	Daphne Gaved	3,179	54.3	
Labour	Brendan O'Brien	1,221	20.9	
BNP	John Pugh	649	11.1	
Conservative	Ken Axford	526	9.0	
Green	Rianne Ten Veen	177	3.0	
National Front	Adrian Davidson	93	1.6	
Majority		1,958	33.4	
Turnout		5,845	30.0	
Liberal Democrats hold		Swing		

Sparkbrook ward
Party	Candidate	Votes	%	±%
Respect	Nahim Khan	3,032	42.6	
Labour	Mohammed Azim	2,600	36.6	
Liberal Democrats	Farah Naz	466	6.6	
Conservative	Guy Hordern	370	5.2	
Community Independent	Talib Hussain	268	3.8	
Green	Charles Alldrick	237	3.3	
BNP	Arthur Botterill	106	1.5	
Majority		432	6.0	
Turnout		7,079	36.8	
Respect gain from Independent		Swing		

Springfield ward
Party	Candidate	Votes	%	±%
Liberal Democrats	Jerry Evans	2,559	33.1	
Labour	Akhlaq Ahmed	2,443	31.6	
Respect	Salma Iqbal	1,920	24.8	
Conservative	Sam Pearce	475	6.1	
BNP	Michael Jones	162	2.1	
Green	Sandra Taylor	149	1.9	
Majority		116	1.5	
Turnout		7,708	39.8	
Liberal Democrats hold		Swing		

Stechford And Yardley North ward
Party	Candidate	Votes	%	±%
Liberal Democrats	Neil Eustace	3,098	58.3	
Labour	John Bliss	848	16.0	
Conservative	Robert Clark	572	10.8	
BNP	Richard Morris	546	10.3	
UKIP	Graham Duffen	154	2.9	
Green	Edith Roberts	85	1.6	
Majority		2,250	42.3	
Turnout		5,303	29.3	
Liberal Democrats hold		Swing		

Stockland Green ward
Party	Candidate	Votes	%	±%
Conservative	Matt Bennett	1,946	41.1	
Labour	Penny Holbrook	1,874	39.6	
Liberal Democrats	Franklyn Aaron	379	8.0	
BNP	Carl Brisker	339	7.2	
Green	John Bentley	182	3.8	
Majority		72	1.5	
Turnout		4,720	27.8	
Conservative gain from Labour		Swing		

Sutton Four Oaks ward
Party	Candidate	Votes	%	±%
Conservative	Peter Howard	4,418	69.3	
Liberal Democrats	Richard Pearson	616	9.7	
Labour	Manish Puri	403	6.3	
UKIP	Brendan Padmore	380	6.0	
BNP	Maureen Davies	341	5.4	
Green	Karl Macnaughton	212	3.3	
Majority		3,802	59.6	
Turnout		6,370	33.7	
Conservative hold		Swing		

Sutton New Hall ward
Party	Candidate	Votes	%	±%
Conservative	Dennis Birbeck	3,722	67.1	
Labour	Elizabeth Dowd	691	12.5	
Liberal Democrats	Jean Woods	479	8.6	
BNP	Karl Benton	458	8.3	
Green	Jim Orford	193	3.5	
Majority		3,031	54.6	
Turnout		5,543	31.6	
Conservative hold		Swing		

Sutton Trinity ward
Party	Candidate	Votes	%	±%
Conservative	Philip Parkin	3,394	61.2	
Labour	Roger Barley	818	14.8	
Liberal Democrats	Maureen Parker	545	9.8	
BNP	Karen Lawrie	353	6.4	
Green	Ulla Grant	234	4.2	
UKIP	Ray Skett	191	3.5	
Majority		2,576	46.4	
Turnout		5,535	28.7	
Conservative hold		Swing		

Sutton Vesey ward
Party	Candidate	Votes	%	±%
Conservative	Malcolm Cornish	3,291	54.4	
Labour	Robert Pocock	1,443	23.9	
Liberal Democrats	Sidney Woods	507	8.4	
BNP	Gemma Orton	369	6.1	
Green	Annabel Smith	215	3.6	
UKIP	Stephen Shorrock	211	3.5	
Majority		1,848	30.5	
Turnout		6,036	32.9	
Conservative hold		Swing		

Tyburn ward
Party	Candidate	Votes	%	±%
Liberal Democrats	Ann Holtom	1,652	36.1	
Labour	Des Hughes	1,144	25.0	
Conservative	Derek Johnson	1,125	24.6	
BNP	Ben Lumby	395	8.6	
Independent	Sallyann Rose	129	2.8	
Green	Tamara Bolger	121	2.6	
Majority		508	11.1	
Turnout		4,566	26.9	
Liberal Democrats hold		Swing		

Washwood Heath ward
Party	Candidate	Votes	%	±%
Liberal Democrats	Tariq Khan	4,342	47.2	
Labour	Mohammed Rasib	4,161	45.2	
Conservative	Ron Storer	328	3.6	
BNP	James Gibson	170	1.9	
Green	Steven Austin	161	1.8	
Majority		181	2.0	
Turnout		9,162	47.3	
Liberal Democrats hold		Swing		

Weoley ward
Party	Candidate	Votes	%	±%
Conservative	Eddie Freeman	2,389	45.5	
Labour Co-op	Jan Drinkwater	1,791	34.1	
Liberal Democrats	Gary Davies	453	8.6	
BNP	Roy Orton	406	7.7	
Green	Mina Coalter	198	3.8	
Majority		598	11.4	
Turnout		5,237	30.0	
Conservative gain from Labour		Swing		
