= 2014 Birmingham City Council election =

2014 UK local government election

- 22 May 2014

One third (40) seats to Birmingham City Council 61 seats needed for a majority

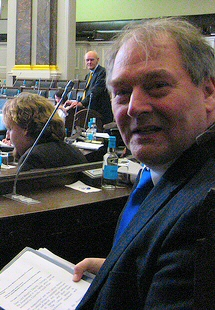

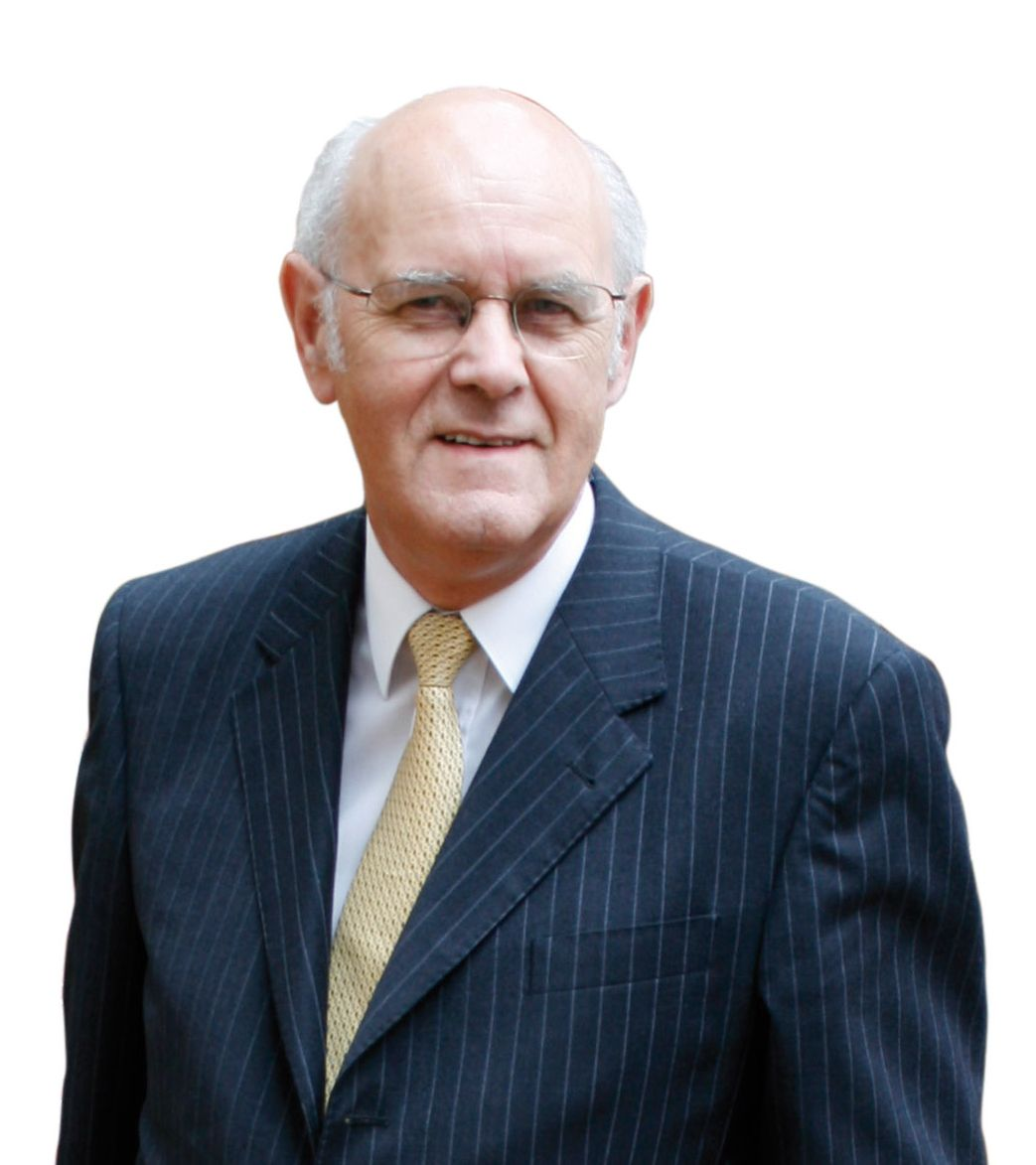
	First party	Second party	Third party
Leader	Albert Bore	Mike Whitby (did not seek re-election)	Paul Tilsley
Party	Labour	Conservative	Liberal Democrats
Leader's seat	Ladywood	Harborne	Sheldon
Seats won	77	31	12
Seat change	▲2	▲2	▼3
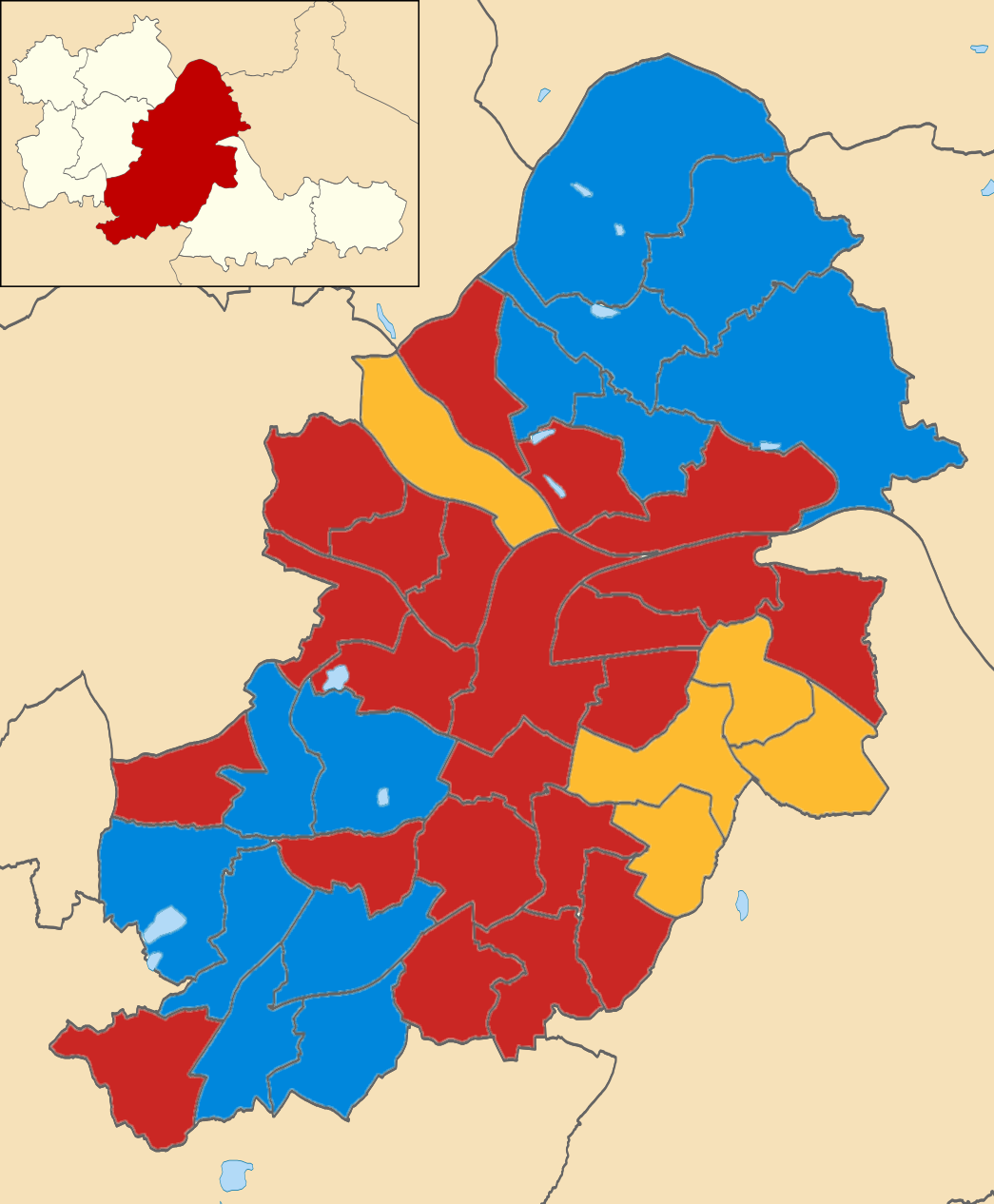
- 2014 local election results in Birmingham.
Council control before election
Labour
Council control after election
Labour

The 2014 Birmingham City Council election took place on 22 May 2014 to elect members of Birmingham City Council in England. This was on the same day as other local elections.

All results are compared to 2010 as that is the term which expired in 2014.

== Result ==
Birmingham City Council Election Result 2014
Party	Seats	Gains	Losses	Net gain/loss	Seats %	Votes %	Votes	+/−
Labour	77	▲2	0	▲2				
Conservative	31	▲2	0	▲2				
Liberal Democrats	12	0	▼3	▼3				
UKIP	0	Steady	Steady	0	0.0			
Green	0	Steady	Steady	0	0.0			
Respect	0	Steady	▼1	▼1	0.0			
Socialist Labour	0	Steady	Steady	0	0.0			
TUSC	0	Steady	Steady	0	0.0			
SDP	0	Steady	Steady	0	0.0			
Communities Against the Cuts	0	Steady	Steady	0	0.0			
BNP	0	Steady	Steady	0	0.0			

== Results by ward ==
=== Acocks Green ===
Acocks Green 2014
Party	Candidate	Votes	%	±%
Liberal Democrats	Roger Harmer	2,679	45.7	▲3.8
Labour	Rachel Seabright	2041	34.8	▲2.3
Green	Amanda Baker	422	7.2	▲4.5
Conservative	Charlotte Hodivala	372	6.3	▼7.3
TUSC	Eamonn Flynn	254	4.3	N/A
SDP	Peter Johnson	98	1.7	▲1.5
Majority		638	10.9	▲1.5
Turnout		5866		
Liberal Democrats hold		Swing		

=== Aston ===
Aston 2014
Party	Candidate	Votes	%	±%
Labour	Ziaul Islam	4,175	68.7	▲13.9
Liberal Democrats	Sham Uddin	1341	22.1	▼10.3
Conservative	Thomas Fraser Pike	452	7.4	▲2.0
Independent	Abdusalam Smith	108	1.8	▼1.3
Majority		2834	46.6	▲24.2
Turnout		6076		
Labour hold		Swing		

=== Bartley Green ===
Bartley Green 2014
Party	Candidate	Votes	%	±%
Conservative	Bruce Lines	2,637	49.5	▲4.5
UKIP	Clair Felton	1308	24.6	N/A
Labour	Mike Zamorski	1108	20.8	▼12.1
Green	Minnie Rahman	167	3.1	▲1.7
Liberal Democrats	Julia Garrett	106	2.0	▼10.8
Majority		1329	25.0	▲12.9
Turnout		5326		
Conservative hold		Swing		

=== Billesley ===
Billesley 2014
Party	Candidate	Votes	%	±%
Labour	Alex Buchanan	2,525	44.1	▲8.1
UKIP	James Dalton	1499	26.2	N/A
Conservative	Andy Rudge	1480	25.9	▼8.6
Liberal Democrats	Christopher Burgess	218	3.8	▼11.3
Majority		1026	17.9	▲18.0
Turnout		5722		
Labour hold		Swing		

=== Bordesley Green ===
Bordesley Green 2014
Party	Candidate	Votes	%	±%
Labour	Mohammed Aikhlaq	3,857	55.5	▲7.5
Liberal Democrats	Mohammed Saeed	2310	33.2	▼5.0
UKIP	Arthur Davis	386	5.6	▲3.0
Green	Alan Clawley	193	2.8	▼0.5
Conservative	William Hordern	171	2.5	▼5.3
TUSC	Theo Sharieff	35	0.5	N/A
Majority		1547	22.3	▲12.4
Turnout		6952		
Labour hold		Swing		

=== Bournville ===
Bournville 2014
Party	Candidate	Votes	%	±%
Conservative	Rob Sealey	3,220	41.4	▲5.0
Labour	Dee Smyth	2466	31.7	▲0.6
UKIP	Ash Mondair	883	11.4	N/A
Green	Cheryl Buxton-Sait	703	9.0	▲3.3
Liberal Democrats	Steve Haynes	295	3.8	▼17.9
Communities Against the Cuts	Robert Nickson	203	2.6	N/A
Majority		754	9.7	▲4.3
Turnout		7770		
Conservative hold		Swing		

=== Edgbaston ===
Edgbaston 2014
Party	Candidate	Votes	%	±%
Conservative	Fergus Robinson	2,235	44.0	▼2.2
Labour	Robbie Lea-Trengrouse	2,061	40.6	▼0.7
UKIP	Keith Rowe	470	9.3	▲6.6
Liberal Democrats	Kaneyalal Chudasama	313	6.2	▲2.2
Majority		174	3.4	▼1.5
Turnout				

=== Erdington ===
Erdington 2014
Party	Candidate	Votes	%	±%
Conservative	Robert Alden	2,743		
Labour Co-op	Keith Heron	1,699		
UKIP	Mel Ward	703		
Liberal Democrats	Philip Mills	115		
TUSC	Joe Foster	79		
BNP	Frances Waldron	66		
Majority		1,044		
Turnout				

=== Hall Green ===
Hall Green 2014
Party	Candidate	Votes	%	±%
Labour	Kerry Jenkins	2,317		
Liberal Democrats	Paula Smith	1,822		
Conservative	Steve Mee	1,046		
Independent	Bob Harvey	972		
UKIP	Vic East	814		
Majority		495		
Turnout				

=== Handsworth Wood ===
Handsworth Wood 2014
Party	Candidate	Votes	%	±%
Labour	Narinder Kooner	4,009		
Conservative	Sukhwinder Sungu	862		
Green	Eric Fairclough	438		
Socialist Labour	John Tyrrell	392		
Liberal Democrats	Paramjit Singh	200		
Majority		3,147		
Turnout				

=== Harborne ===
Harborne 2014
Party	Candidate	Votes	%	±%
Conservative	John Alden	2,816	41.4	
Labour	Nabila Zulfiqar	2,518	37.0	
Green	Phil Simpson	637		
UKIP	Charles Brecknell	574		
Liberal Democrats	Philip Banting	258		
Majority		298		
Turnout				
Conservative hold		Swing		

=== Hodge Hill ===
Hodge Hill 2014
Party	Candidate	Votes	%	±%
Labour	Fiona Williams	2,848		
UKIP	Adrian Duffen	1,246		
Liberal Democrats	Mohammad Azam	1,057		
Conservative	Cyrus Hodivala	495		
Majority		1,602		
Turnout				

=== Kings Norton ===
Kings Norton 2014
Party	Candidate	Votes	%	±%
Conservative	Simon Jevon	1,837		
Labour Co-op	Steve Bedser	1,722		
UKIP	Timothy Plumbe	1,222		
Liberal Democrats	Peter Lloyd	213		
Communities Against the Cuts	Christopher Hughes	207		
Majority		115		
Turnout				

=== Kingstanding ===
Kingstanding 2014
Party	Candidate	Votes	%	±%
Conservative	Ron Storer	1,578		
Labour	Desmond Hughes	1,546		
UKIP	Jan Higgins	1,128		
BNP	Frances Burke	92		
Liberal Democrats	Graham Lippiatt	77		
Majority		32		
Turnout				

=== Ladywood ===
Ladywood 2014
Party	Candidate	Votes	%	±%
Labour	Carl Rice	2,308		
Conservative	Tim Skidmore	655		
UKIP	John Hine	396		
Green	Hazel Clawley	371		
Liberal Democrats	Khondaker Alam	221		
Majority		1,653		
Turnout				

=== Longbridge ===
Longbridge 2014
Party	Candidate	Votes	%	±%
Labour Co-op	Ian Cruise	1,669		
Conservative	Derek Johnson	1,598		
UKIP	Steven Brookes	1,544		
Green	Aysha Turner	238		
Liberal Democrats	Kevin Hannon	157		
TUSC	Clive Walder	55		
Majority		71		
Turnout				

N.B. Cruise left the Labour Party in August 2015 and now sits as an Independent.

=== Lozells and East Handsworth ===
Lozells and East Handsworth 2014
Party	Candidate	Votes	%	±%
Labour	Hendrina Quinnen	4,179		
Liberal Democrats	Talukder Hussain	953		
Conservative	Ravi Chumber	478		
TUSC	Alistair Wingate	307		
Majority		3,226		
Turnout				

=== Moseley and Kings Heath ===
Moseley and Kings Heath 2014
Party	Candidate	Votes	%	±%
Labour Co-op	Claire Spencer	3,099		
Liberal Democrats	Ernie Hendricks	1,963		
Green	Elly Stanton	768		
Conservative	Alistair Wingate	623		
UKIP	Alan Blumenthal	494		
TUSC	Michael Friel	494		
Majority		3,226		
Turnout				

=== Nechells ===
Nechells 2014
Party	Candidate	Votes	%	±%
Labour	Chauhdry Rashid	3,156		
Conservative	Abdi Elmi	574		
Green	Janet Assheton	556		
Liberal Democrats	Shazad Iqbal	307		
Majority		2,582		
Turnout				

=== Northfield ===
Northfield 2014
Party	Candidate	Votes	%	±%
Conservative	Randal Brew	2,697		
Labour Co-op	Carole Griffiths	1,768		
UKIP	Barrie Clews	1,366		
Green	Susan Pearce	308		
Liberal Democrats	Andrew Moles	145		
Communities Against the Cuts	Katherine Dunn	86		
Majority		929		
Turnout				

=== Oscott ===
Oscott 2014
Party	Candidate	Votes	%	±%
Labour	Barbara Dring	1,962		
UKIP	Roger Tempest	1,623		
Conservative	Graham Green	1,364		
Green	Harry Eyles	188		
Liberal Democrats	Nicholas Joliffe	117		
Majority		339		
Turnout				

=== Perry Barr ===
Perry Barr 2014
Party	Candidate	Votes	%	±%
Liberal Democrats	Karen Hamilton	2,437		
Labour Co-op	Sarfraiz Hussain	2,278		
UKIP	Charles Douglas	908		
Conservative	Georgina Chandler	392		
Majority		159		
Turnout				

=== Quinton ===
Quinton 2014
Party	Candidate	Votes	%	±%
Labour	Matthew Gregson	2,612	42.3	
Conservative	Ian Colpman	1,922	31.2	
UKIP	Laura Howard	1,096		
Green	Peter Beck	329		
Liberal Democrats	Ian Garrett	175		
TUSC	Nick Hart	34		
Majority		690		
Turnout				

=== Selly Oak ===
Selly Oak 2014
Party	Candidate	Votes	%	±%
Labour	Changese Khan	1,684	32	▼12
Liberal Democrats	David Radcliffe	1,609	31	▼1
Green	Joe Rooney	711	14	▲7
Conservative	Monica Hardie	687	13	▲1
UKIP	Peter Hughes	498	10	▲6
Majority		75		
Turnout		5189		
Labour gain from Liberal Democrats		Swing		

=== Shard End ===
Shard End 2014
Party	Candidate	Votes	%	±%
Labour	John Cotton	1,791		
UKIP	Iain Roden	1,754		
Conservative	Roger King	446		
Green	Stephen Parker	301		
BNP	Kevin McHugh	134		
Liberal Democrats	Christopher Barber	132		
TUSC	Ken Marks	48		
Majority		37		
Turnout				

=== Sheldon ===
Sheldon 2014
Party	Candidate	Votes	%	±%
Liberal Democrats	Mike Ward	2,750	52.1	
UKIP	David Bridges	1,262	23.9	
Labour	Bob Collins	850	16.1	
Conservative	Keely Huxtable	338	6.4	
TUSC	Mark Andrews	80	1.5	
Majority		1,488		
Turnout				

=== Soho ===
Soho 2014
Party	Candidate	Votes	%	±%
Labour Co-op	Sharon Thompson	4,026		
Conservative	Robert Higginson	557		
Liberal Democrats	Cabdul Ruumi	353		
Green	Margaret Okole	310		
Majority		3,469		
Turnout				

=== South Yardley ===
South Yardley 2014
Party	Candidate	Votes	%	±%
Liberal Democrats	Zaker Choudhry	2,614		
Labour Co-op	Kate Booth	2,448		
UKIP	Albert Duffen	1,060		
Conservative	Julia Mackey	279		
Independent	Dave Willis	86		
TUSC	Siobhan Friel	38		
Majority		3,469		
Turnout				

=== Sparkbrook ===
Sparkbrook 2014
Party	Candidate	Votes	%	±%
Labour	Victoria Quinn	5,382		
Liberal Democrats	Asad Mehmood	750		
Conservative	John Turner	341		
Majority		4,632		
Turnout				

=== Springfield ===
Springfield 2014
Party	Candidate	Votes	%	±%
Labour	Mohammed Fazal	3,845		
Liberal Democrats	Tanveer Choudhry	2,641		
UKIP	Martin Barrett	395		
Conservative	David Agar	384		
Majority		1,204		
Turnout				

=== Stechford and Yardley North ===
Stechford and Yardley North 2014
Party	Candidate	Votes	%	±%
Liberal Democrats	Carol Jones	2,685		
Labour	Diane Donaldson	1,523		
UKIP	Graham Duffen	1,128		
Conservative	Robert Clark	271		
Green	Grant Bishop	164		
Majority		1,162		
Turnout				

=== Stockland Green ===
Stockland Green 2014
Party	Candidate	Votes	%	±%
Labour	Penny Holbrook	3,451		
Conservative	Daniel Caldicott	494		
TUSC	Ted Woodley	347		
Liberal Democrats	Franklyn Aaron	294		
Majority		2,957		
Turnout				

=== Sutton Four Oaks ===
Sutton Four Oaks 2014
Party	Candidate	Votes	%	±%
Conservative	Anne Underwood	3,628		
UKIP	Brendan Padmore	1,370		
Labour	Nick Preston	884		
Green	David Ratcliff	343		
Liberal Democrats	Hubert Duffy	302		
Majority		2,258		
Turnout				

=== Sutton New Hall ===
Sutton New Hall 2014
Party	Candidate	Votes	%	±%
Conservative	Ken Wood	2,659		
UKIP	Stewart Cotterill	1,429		
Labour	Ian Brindley	1,129		
Liberal Democrats	Trevor Holtom	296		
Majority		1,230		
Turnout				

=== Sutton Trinity ===
Sutton Trinity 2014 (2)
Party	Candidate	Votes	%	±%
Conservative	Ewan Mackey	2,985		
Conservative	Margaret Waddington	2,916		
UKIP	Marcus Brown	1,617		
Labour	Roger Barley	1,514		
Labour	Philip Innamorati	1,154		
Liberal Democrats	Sally Lippiatt	571		
Majority				
Turnout				

=== Sutton Vesey ===
Sutton Vesey 2014
Party	Candidate	Votes	%	±%
Conservative	Andrew Hardie	2,564		
Labour	Manish Puri	2,314		
UKIP	Albert Meehan	1,229		
Liberal Democrats	Lynn Williams	332		
Majority		250		
Turnout				

=== Tyburn ===
Tyburn 2014
Party	Candidate	Votes	%	±%
Labour	Lynda Clinton	2,171		
Conservative	Clifton Welch	864		
Liberal Democrats	Ann Holtom	647		
TUSC	James Redfern	379		
Majority		1,307		
Turnout				

=== Washwood Heath ===
Washwood Heath 2014
Party	Candidate	Votes	%	±%
Labour	Mohammed Idrees	6,598		
Liberal Democrats	Waheed Rafiq	537		
Conservative	Alexander Hall	352		
Green	John Bentley	374		
Majority		6,061		
Turnout				

=== Weoley ===
Weoley 2014
Party	Candidate	Votes	%	±%
Conservative	Peter Douglas	2,287		
Labour	Stephen Booton	1,780		
UKIP	Kevin Morris	1,205		
Green	Anna Masters	305		
Liberal Democrats	Sally Haynes-Preece	223		
Majority		507		
Turnout				
