= Weoley (ward) =

Coordinates: 52.4376°N 1.9702°W

- Ward
- Population: 25,925 (2011)
- Metropolitan borough: Birmingham
- District: City of Birmingham
- Metropolitan county: West Midlands
- Region: West Midlands
- Country: England
- Sovereign state: United Kingdom
- Post town: BIRMINGHAM
- Postcode district: B
- Dialling code: 0121
- UK Parliament: Birmingham Northfield
- Councillors: Peter Douglas Osborn (Conservative Party); Julie Johnson JP (Labour Party); Steve Booton (Labour Party)

The Weoley local council ward is one of the 40 electoral wards for the City of Birmingham, England. It is also one of the four wards that make up the local council constituency of Birmingham Northfield, the other three being the wards of Northfield, Longbridge and King's Norton.

== Ward Description ==
The ward covers an area of west Birmingham. It is predominantly based upon the Weoley Castle area of Birmingham. Other communities within Weoley are Allens Cross, Weoley Hill, Middle Park Farm and Spicelands Road.

== Ward Demographics (from the census of 2011) ==
The 2011 Population Census recorded that there were 25,925 people living in the ward. Eighty per cent (20,744) of the ward's population are of white ethnicity, compared with 57.9% for Birmingham.

== Ward history ==
The Ward was created in May 1950 as a result of the boundary changes of that year. The boundaries have been changed on a number of occasions since then.

== Parliamentary Representation ==
The ward has been part of Birmingham Northfield constituency since 1950, which has been represented by Gary Sambrook of the (Conservative Party (United Kingdom)) since he was elected on 12 December 2019.

== Politics ==
As of 2017, the Ward is served by three councillors on Birmingham City Council: Conservative Peter Douglas Osborn, and two Labour Party councillors: Steve Booton and Julie Johnson.

== Election results ==
=== Elections in the 2010s ===
2016 Birmingham City Council election, Weoley
Party	Candidate	Votes	%	±%
Labour	Julie Johnson	2,125	40.7	
Conservative	Eddie Freeman	1,943	37.2	
UKIP	Steven Brookes	739	14.2	
Liberal Democrats	Steve Haynes	213	4.1	
Green	Ben Kerr-Morgan	200	3.8	
Majority		182	3.5	
Turnout		5,220	30.1	
Registered electors		17,330		
Labour gain from Conservative		Swing		

2015 Birmingham City Council election, Weoley
Party	Candidate	Votes	%	±%
Labour	Steve Booton	4,118	40.4	
Conservative	Jayne Freeman	3,519	34.6	
UKIP	Tony Hayes	1,641	16.1	
Green	Anna Lucille Masters	494	4.9	
Liberal Democrats	Steven Alan Haynes	412	4.1	
Majority		599	5.9	
Turnout		10,184	58	
Registered electors		17,542		
Labour gain from Conservative		Swing		

2014 Birmingham City Council election, Weoley
Party	Candidate	Votes	%	±%
Conservative	Peter Osborn	2,287	39.4	
Labour	Steve Booton	1,780	30.7	
UKIP	Kevin Morris	1,205	20.8	
Green	Anna Masters	305	5.3	
Liberal Democrats	Sally Haynes-Preece	223	3.8	
Majority		507	8.7	
Turnout		5,800	33	
Conservative hold		Swing		

2012 Birmingham City Council election, Weoley
Party	Candidate	Votes	%	±%
Conservative	Eddie Freeman	2,117	43.2	
Labour	Steve Booton	2,115	43.2	
Green	Ross Kendall Axe	239	4.9	
Liberal Democrats	Steven Alan Haynes	216	4.4	
BNP	Leslie John Orton	213	4.4	
Majority		2	0.0	
Turnout		4,900	27.2	
Registered electors		18,027		
Conservative hold		Swing		

2011 Birmingham City Council election, Weoley
Party	Candidate	Votes	%	±%
Conservative	Adrian Delaney	2,599	41.7	
Labour Co-op	Chris Hillcox	2,587	41.5	
Liberal Democrats	Trevor Sword	402	6.4	
Green	David Williams	312	5.0	
BNP	John Grainger	305	4.9	
Majority		12	0.2	
Turnout		6,239	35.3	
Registered electors		17,655		
Conservative hold		Swing		

2010 Birmingham City Council election, Weoley
Party	Candidate	Votes	%	±%
Conservative	Peter Osborn	3,639	36.1	
Labour	Christopher Hillcox	3,575	35.4	
Liberal Democrats	Trevor Sword	1,694	16.8	
BNP	Trevor Shearer	873	8.7	
Green	David Toke	277	2.7	
Majority		64	0.6	
Turnout		10,094	57.82	
Registered electors		17,457		
Conservative hold		Swing		

=== Elections in the 2000s ===
2008 Birmingham City Council election, Weoley
Party	Candidate	Votes	%	±%
Conservative	Eddie Freeman	2,389	45.5	
Labour Co-op	Jan Drinkwater	1,791	34.1	
Liberal Democrats	Gary Davies	453	8.6	
BNP	Roy Orton	406	7.7	
Green	Mina Coalter	198	3.8	
Majority		598	11.4	
Turnout		5,249	30.0	
Registered electors		17,526		
Conservative gain from Labour		Swing		

2007 Birmingham City Council election, Weoley
Party	Candidate	Votes	%	±%
Conservative	Adrian Delaney	2,187	37.0	
Labour Co-op	Mike Drinkwater	1,860	31.5	
BNP	Norman Ashton	548	9.3	
Liberal Democrats	Trevor Sword	534	9.0	
Independent	Mark Jastrzebski	264	4.5	
Green	Stuart Masters	237	4.0	
Common Good	Dick Rodgers	198	3.3	
UKIP	David Collin	83	1.4	
Majority			%	
Turnout				
Conservative hold		Swing		

2006 Birmingham City Council election, Weoley
Party	Candidate	Votes	%	±%
Conservative	Peter Osborn	2,207	35.9	
Labour	Michael Drinkwater	1,873	30.5	
BNP	Julie Ashton	1,004	16.3	
Liberal Democrats	Trevor Sword	758	12.3	
Green	David Toke	307	5.0	
Majority			%	
Turnout				
Conservative hold		Swing		

2004 Birmingham City Council election, Weoley (3 seats)
Party	Candidate	Votes	%	±%
Labour	Jan Drinkwater	2,001	25.8	
Conservative	Adrian Delaney	1,971	25.4	
Conservative	Peter Osborn	1,971	25.4	
Conservative	Edwin Freeman	1,957	25.4	
Labour	Peter Mayer	1,849		
Labour	Fiona Williams	1,645		
Liberal	Raymond Holtom	1,057	13.6	
Liberal	Marjorie Morrison	976		
BNP	Lee Windridge	947	12.2	
Liberal	John Axe	900		
UKIP	David Collin	986	11.5	
Green	David Toke	622	8	
Independent	Mark Jastrzebski	275	3.5	
Majority				
Turnout				
Labour hold		Swing		
Conservative gain from Labour		Swing		
Conservative gain from Labour		Swing		

2003 Birmingham City Council election, Weoley
Party	Candidate	Votes	%	±%
Labour	Ray Holtom	1,713	37.2	
Conservative	Adrian Delaney	1,595	34.6	
BNP	Lee Windridge	709	15.4	
Liberal Democrats	Steven Tomlin	593	12.9	
Majority			2.6	
Turnout			30.6	
Registered electors		15,110		
Labour hold		Swing		

2002 Birmingham City Council election, Weoley
Party	Candidate	Votes	%	±%
Labour	Fiona Williams	1,716	35.8	
Conservative	Adrian Delaney	1,634	34.1	
Independent	Peter Spybey	573	11.9	
Liberal Democrats	Steven Tomlin	523	10.9	
BNP	Lee Windridge	351	7.3	
Majority			1.7	
Turnout			31.7	
Registered electors		15,309		
Labour hold		Swing		

=== Elections in the 1950s ===
1955 Birmingham City Council election, Weoley
Party	Candidate	Votes	%	±%
Labour	William Henry Milner	5,225	61.3	
Conservative	Ernest Frank Scadding	2,875	33.7	
Liberal	Kenneth Arnold Day	261	3.1	
Communist	Albert Charles Norton	163	1.91	
Majority		2,350	27.6	
Turnout			39.6	
Registered electors		21,518		
Labour hold		Swing	5.7	

1954 Birmingham City Council election, Weoley
Party	Candidate	Votes	%	±%
Labour	Edmund John Haynes	5,702	68.6	
Conservative	Amy Whitehouse	2,471	29.7	
Communist	Albert Norton	136	1.6	
Majority		3,231	38.9	
Turnout			40.8	
Registered electors		20,357		
Labour hold		Swing	3.4	

1953 Birmingham City Council election, Weoley
Party	Candidate	Votes	%	±%
Labour	Bertha Briggs	5,119	66.0	
Conservative	Lillian Budd	2,634	34.0	
Majority		2,565	32.1	
Turnout			40.3	
Registered electors		19,246		
Labour hold		Swing	7.0	

1952 Birmingham City Council election, Weoley
Party	Candidate	Votes	%	±%
Labour	William Milner	6,618	73.0	
Conservative	Dudley Scandrett	2,449	27.0	
Majority		4,169	46..0	
Turnout			51.6	
Registered electors		17,584		
Labour hold		Swing	▲13.6	

1951 Birmingham City Council election, Weoley
Party	Candidate	Votes	%	±%
Labour	Edmund Haynes	4,352	59.4	
Conservative	Dudley Scandrett	2,975	40.6	
Majority		1,377	18.8	
Turnout			43.2	
Registered electors		16,958		
Labour hold		Swing	5.5	

1950 Birmingham City Council election, Weoley, (3 New Seats)
Party	Candidate	Votes	%	±%
Labour	Bertha Briggs	4,815	63.5	
Labour	William Milner	4,623		
Labour	Edmund Haynes	4,611		
Conservative	John Gopsill	2,550	33.6	
Conservative	William Rathbone	2,533		
Conservative	Dudley Scandrett	2,496		
Communist	John Elder	222	2.9	
Communist	Daisy Vaughan	210		
Majority		2,265	29.9	
Majority		2,073		
Majority		2,061		
Turnout		7,644	45.6	
Registered electors		16,765		
Labour win (new seat)				
Labour win (new seat)				
Labour win (new seat)				

== See also ==
- Birmingham City Council elections
