= Selly Oak (ward) =

- Ward
- Population: 25,885 (2011.Ward)
- District: City of Birmingham
- Metropolitan county: West Midlands
- Region: West Midlands
- Country: England
- Sovereign state: United Kingdom
- UK Parliament: Birmingham Selly Oak
- Councillors: Changese Khan (Labour); Brigid Jones (Labour); Karen McCarthy (Labour)

The Selly Oak local council ward was one of the 40 electoral wards for the City of Birmingham, England prior to 2018. It was also one of the four wards that make up the local council constituency of Selly Oak, the other three being the wards of Billesley, Bournville and Brandwood.

== Description ==
The Selly Oak ward covered an area of south Birmingham, and includes not only the suburb of Selly Oak but also the adjoining districts of Bournbrook, Selly Park and Ten Acres, together with a small part of the Stirchley area. It was replaced by Weoley and Selly Oak ward and Bournbrook and Selly Park ward both created in 2018.

== Demographics (from the census of 2001) ==
The 2001 Population Census recorded that 25,792 people were living in the Selly Oak ward, with a population density of 4,236 people per km^{2} compared with 3,649 people per km^{2} for Birmingham. The ward has a below-average percentage of ethnic minorities, with only 15.9% of the population consisting of ethnic minorities compared with 29.6% for Birmingham in general.

== History ==
The Ward came into existence in 1911 when the boundaries of the City of Birmingham were extended as a result of the Greater Birmingham Act, and when the number of electoral wards in the city was extended from 18 to 30. At that stage, three councillors were elected for the Ward, whereas in subsequent years there have been single elections. The area had previously been part of the Parish of Northfield, and originally in north Worcestershire. It was created by the union of two former electoral wards of the King's Norton and Northfield urban district, namely the Selly Oak (East) Ward, covering the districts of Bournbrook, Selly Park and Ten Acres, and the Selly Oak (West) Ward, covering Selly Oak itself and part of the district of Bournville).

== Parliamentary representation ==
Under the Representation of the People Act 1918 the wards of Selly Oak and Northfield, together with that "part of King's Norton Ward which is not included in the Moseley Division" were to form the Parliamentary constituency of King's Norton. Selly Oak ward remained within the King's Norton constituency until boundary alterations were provided in the 1948 Representation of the People Act, and the Northfield ward was placed in the newly constituted Parliamentary constituency of Northfield in 1950. Further boundary changes led to the creation of a distinct Selly Oak Parliamentary constituency in 1955, in which the ward of Selly Oak has since remained.

Birmingham electoral wards were changed in 2018, when the existing Selly Oak ward was divided between new Bournbrook and Selly Park, Bournville, and Selly Oak and Weoley wards.

== Politics ==
The elected Birmingham City Council members prior to the wards dissolution were: Karen McCarthy, Brigid Jones and Changese Khan of the Labour Party. At the time Brigid Jones was also Birmingham City Council's Cabinet Member for Children and Family Services.

== Election results ==
=== 2010s ===
2016 Birmingham City Council election Selly Oak
| Party | Candidate | Votes | % | ±% |
|---|---|---|---|---|
| Labour | Karen McCarthy | 2,141 | 51.8 | ▲9.3 |
| Conservative | Monica Hardie | 779 | 18.9 | ▼3.9 |
| Liberal Democrats | Colin Green | 763 | 18.5 | ▲3.3 |
| Green | Daniel Wilshire | 381 | 9.2 | ▼2.9 |
| TUSC | Theo Sharieff | 67 | 1.6 | ▲0.4 |
| Turnout | | 4131 | | |
| Labour hold | | Swing | | |

2015 Birmingham City Council election Selly Oak
| Party | Candidate | Votes | % | ±% |
|---|---|---|---|---|
| Labour | Brigid Jones | 4,160 | 42.5 | |
| Conservative | Monica Catherine Hardie | 2225 | 22.7 | |
| Liberal Democrats | Colin Green | 1484 | 15.2 | |
| Green | Joe Rooney | 1189 | 12.2 | |
| UKIP | Sylvia Tempest-Jones | 602 | 6.2 | |
| TUSC | Keturah Prendergast | 122 | 1.2 | |
| Turnout | | 9782 | | |
| Labour hold | | Swing | | |

2014 Birmingham City Council election Selly Oak Electorate
| Party | Candidate | Votes | % | ±% |
|---|---|---|---|---|
| Labour | Changese Khan | 1,684 | 32 | −▼12 |
| Liberal Democrats | David Radcliffe | 1609 | 31 | ▼1 |
| Green | Joe Rooney | 711 | 14 | ▲7 |
| Conservative | Monica Hardie | 687 | 13 | ▲1 |
| UKIP | Peter Hughes | 498 | 10 | ▲6 |
| Turnout | | 5189 | | |
| Labour gain from Liberal Democrats | | Swing | | |

2012 Birmingham City Council election Selly Oak Electorate
| Party | Candidate | Votes | % | ±% |
|---|---|---|---|---|
| Labour Co-op | Karen McCathy | 1,833 | 44 | Steady |
| Liberal Democrats | Alistair Dow | 1,332 | 32 | ▲7 |
| Conservative | Monica Hardie | 509 | 12 | ▼6 |
| Green | David Toke | 271 | 7 | ▼3 |
| UKIP | Robin Norton | 179 | 4 | ▼1 |
| Turnout | | 4,144 | | |
| Labour gain from Liberal Democrats | | Swing | | |

2011 Birmingham City Council election Selly Oak Electorate 19,167
| Party | Candidate | Votes | % | ±% |
|---|---|---|---|---|
| Labour | Brigid Jones | 2,855 | 44 | ▲1 |
| Liberal Democrats | Robert Wright | 1,633 | 25 | ▼4 |
| Conservative | Owen Williams | 1,170 | 18 | ▼3 |
| Green | Charlene Bale | 597 | 9 | ▲5 |
| UKIP | Peter Hughes | 230 | 3.4 | |
| Turnout | | 6,566 | 34.2 | |
| Labour gain from Liberal Democrats | | Swing | | |

2010 Birmingham City Council election Selly Oak Electorate 19,037
| Party | Candidate | Votes | % | ±% |
|---|---|---|---|---|
| Liberal Democrats | David Radcliffe | 4,536 | 43 | Steady |
| Labour | Brigid Jones | 3,142 | 29 | ▲2 |
| Conservative | Andrew Hardie | 2,214 | 21 | ▲1 |
| Green | James Burn | 453 | 4 | ▼3 |
| BNP | Zane Patchell | 230 | 2 | ▼2 |
| CPA | David Booth | 80 | 1 | |
| Majority | | | | |
| Turnout | | | | |
| Liberal Democrats hold | | Swing | | |

=== 2000s ===
2008 Birmingham City Council election Selly Oak Electorate 18,470
| Party | Candidate | Votes | % | ±% |
|---|---|---|---|---|
| Liberal Democrats | Alistair Dow | 1,948 | 42.2 | |
| Labour | David Williams | 1,274 | 27.6 | |
| Conservative | Andrew Hardie | 889 | 19.3 | |
| Green | Peter Tinsley | 319 | 6.9 | |
| BNP | Trevor Shearer | 176 | 3.8 | |
| Majority | | 674 | 24.6 | |
| Turnout | | 4,626 | 25.0 | |
| Liberal Democrats hold | | Swing | | |

2007 Birmingham City Council election Selly Oak
| Party | Candidate | Votes | % | ±% |
|---|---|---|---|---|
| Liberal Democrats | Robert Wright | 2,081 | | |
| Labour | David Williams | 1,620 | | |
| Conservative | Andrew Hardie | 956 | | |
| Green | Peter Tinsley | 546 | | |
| BNP | Jeffrey Cahill | 230 | | |
| Majority | | | | |
| Turnout | | | | |
| Liberal Democrats hold | | Swing | | |

2005 Birmingham City Council election Selly Oak
| Party | Candidate | Votes | % | ±% |
|---|---|---|---|---|
| Liberal Democrats | David Radcliffe | 2,503 | 41.4 | |
| Labour | D Williams | 1616 | 26.7 | |
| Conservative | B Wood | 1042 | 17.2 | |
| Green | P Tinsley | 554 | 9.2 | |
| BNP | P Billingham | 328 | 5.4 | |
| Majority | | | | |
| Liberal Democrats gain from Labour | | Swing | | |
| Conservative hold | | Swing | | |

2004 Birmingham City Council election Selly Oak
| Party | Candidate | Votes | % | ±% |
|---|---|---|---|---|
| Liberal Democrats | C Dow | 2,556 | 37.7 | |
| Liberal Democrats | Robert Wright | 2277 | | |
| Liberal Democrats | David Radcliffe | 2245 | | |
| Labour | A Coulson | 2093 | | |
| Labour | D Williams | 1975 | | |
| Labour | A Burnett | 1847 | | |
| Conservative | D Green | 1179 | 17.4 | |
| Conservative | B Wood | 1030 | | |
| Green | P Tinsley | 945 | 14.0 | |
| Conservative | I Hussain | 926 | | |
| Majority | | | | |
| Liberal Democrats gain from Labour | | Swing | | |

2003 Birmingham City Council election Selly Oak Electorate 21,876
| Party | Candidate | Votes | % | ±% |
|---|---|---|---|---|
| Liberal Democrats | C. Dow | 2,459 | 40.6 | |
| Labour | D. Williams | 2,232 | 36.9 | |
| Conservative | I. Hussain | 922 | 15.2 | |
| Green | B. Smith | 443 | 7.3 | |
| Majority | | | 3.7 | |
| Turnout | | | 27.8 | |
| Liberal Democrats gain from Labour | | Swing | | |

2002 Birmingham City Council election Selly Oak Electorate 21,967
| Party | Candidate | Votes | % | ±% |
|---|---|---|---|---|
| Labour | A. Coulson | 2,690 | 40.8 | |
| Liberal Democrats | C. Dow | 2,308 | 35.0 | |
| Conservative | P. Hawtin | 1,201 | 18.2 | |
| Green | B. Smith | 395 | 6.0 | |
| Majority | | | 5.8 | |
| Turnout | | | 30.2 | |
| Labour hold | | Swing | | |

2001 Birmingham City Council election Selly Oak
| Party | Candidate | Votes | % | ±% |
|---|---|---|---|---|
| Majority | | | % | |

2000 Birmingham City Council election Selly Oak
| Party | Candidate | Votes | % | ±% |
|---|---|---|---|---|
| Majority | | | % | |

=== 1990s ===
1999 Birmingham City Council election Selly Oak
| Party | Candidate | Votes | % | ±% |
|---|---|---|---|---|
| Majority | | | | |

1998 Birmingham City Council election Selly Oak
| Party | Candidate | Votes | % | ±% |
|---|---|---|---|---|
| Majority | | | | |

1997 Birmingham City Council election Selly Oak
| Party | Candidate | Votes | % | ±% |
|---|---|---|---|---|
| Majority | | | | |

1996 Birmingham City Council election Selly Oak
| Party | Candidate | Votes | % | ±% |
|---|---|---|---|---|
| Majority | | | | |

1995 Birmingham City Council election Selly Oak
| Party | Candidate | Votes | % | ±% |
|---|---|---|---|---|
| Majority | | | | |

1994 Birmingham City Council election Selly Oak
| Party | Candidate | Votes | % | ±% |
|---|---|---|---|---|
| Majority | | | | |

1993 Birmingham City Council election Selly Oak
| Party | Candidate | Votes | % | ±% |
|---|---|---|---|---|
| Majority | | | | |

1992 Birmingham City Council election Selly Oak
| Party | Candidate | Votes | % | ±% |
|---|---|---|---|---|
| Majority | | | | |

1991 Birmingham City Council election Selly Oak
| Party | Candidate | Votes | % | ±% |
|---|---|---|---|---|
| Majority | | | % | |

1990 Birmingham City Council election Selly Oak
| Party | Candidate | Votes | % | ±% |
|---|---|---|---|---|
| Majority | | | % | |

=== 1980s ===
1989 Birmingham City Council election Selly Oak
| Party | Candidate | Votes | % | ±% |
|---|---|---|---|---|
| Majority | | | % | |

1988 Birmingham City Council election Selly Oak
| Party | Candidate | Votes | % | ±% |
|---|---|---|---|---|
| Majority | | | % | |

1987 Birmingham City Council election Selly Oak
| Party | Candidate | Votes | % | ±% |
|---|---|---|---|---|
| Majority | | | % | |

1986 Birmingham City Council election Selly Oak
| Party | Candidate | Votes | % | ±% |
|---|---|---|---|---|
| Majority | | | % | |

1985 Birmingham City Council election Selly Oak
| Party | Candidate | Votes | % | ±% |
|---|---|---|---|---|
| Majority | | | % | |

1984 Birmingham City Council election Selly Oak
| Party | Candidate | Votes | % | ±% |
|---|---|---|---|---|
| Majority | | | % | |

1983 Birmingham City Council election Selly Oak
| Party | Candidate | Votes | % | ±% |
|---|---|---|---|---|
| Majority | | | % | |

1982 Birmingham City Council election Selly Oak
| Party | Candidate | Votes | % | ±% |
|---|---|---|---|---|
| Majority | | | % | |

1981 Birmingham City Council election Selly Oak
| Party | Candidate | Votes | % | ±% |
|---|---|---|---|---|
| Majority | | | % | |

1980 Birmingham City Council election Selly Oak
| Party | Candidate | Votes | % | ±% |
|---|---|---|---|---|
| Majority | | | % | |

=== 1970s ===
1979 Birmingham City Council election Selly Oak
| Party | Candidate | Votes | % | ±% |
|---|---|---|---|---|
| Majority | | | % | |

1978 Birmingham City Council election Selly Oak
| Party | Candidate | Votes | % | ±% |
|---|---|---|---|---|
| Majority | | | % | |

1977 Birmingham City Council election Selly Oak
| Party | Candidate | Votes | % | ±% |
|---|---|---|---|---|
| Majority | | | | |

1976 Birmingham City Council election Selly Oak
| Party | Candidate | Votes | % | ±% |
|---|---|---|---|---|
| Majority | | | % | |

1975 Birmingham City Council election Selly Oak
| Party | Candidate | Votes | % | ±% |
|---|---|---|---|---|
| Majority | | | % | |

1974 Birmingham City Council election Selly Oak
| Party | Candidate | Votes | % | ±% |
|---|---|---|---|---|
| Majority | | | % | |

1973 Birmingham City Council election Selly Oak
| Party | Candidate | Votes | % | ±% |
|---|---|---|---|---|
| Majority | | | % | |

1972 Birmingham City Council election Selly Oak
| Party | Candidate | Votes | % | ±% |
|---|---|---|---|---|
| Majority | | | % | |

1971 Birmingham City Council election Selly Oak
| Party | Candidate | Votes | % | ±% |
|---|---|---|---|---|
| Majority | | | % | |

1970 Birmingham City Council election Selly Oak
| Party | Candidate | Votes | % | ±% |
|---|---|---|---|---|
| Majority | | | % | |

=== 1960s ===
1969 Birmingham City Council election Selly Oak
| Party | Candidate | Votes | % | ±% |
|---|---|---|---|---|
| Majority | | | | |
| Turnout | | | | |

1968 Birmingham City Council election Selly Oak
| Party | Candidate | Votes | % | ±% |
|---|---|---|---|---|
| Majority | | | | |
| Turnout | | | | |

1967 Birmingham City Council election Selly Oak
| Party | Candidate | Votes | % | ±% |
|---|---|---|---|---|
| Majority | | | | |
| Turnout | | | | |

1966 Birmingham City Council election Selly Oak Electorate 18,726
| Party | Candidate | Votes | % | ±% |
|---|---|---|---|---|
| Conservative | Robert Berrow | 4,248 | 56.7 | |
| Labour | James Cheshire | 2,015 | 26.9 | |
| Liberal | Ruth Lewthwaite | 964 | 12.9 | |
| Communist | John Bennett | 260 | 3.5 | |
| Majority | | 2,233 | 29.8 | |
| Turnout | | | 40.0 | |
| Conservative hold | | Swing | 3.1 | |

1965 Birmingham City Council election Selly Oakj Electorate 18,918
| Party | Candidate | Votes | % | ±% |
|---|---|---|---|---|
| Conservative | Donald Lewis | 4,761 | 59.6 | |
| Labour | James Cheshire | 1,882 | 23.6 | |
| Liberal | Ruth Lewthwaite | 1,111 | 13.9 | |
| Communist | John Bennett | 231 | 2.9 | |
| Majority | | 2,879 | 36.1 | |
| Turnout | | | 42.2 | |
| Conservative hold | | Swing | 12.7 | |

1964 Birmingham City Council election Selly Oak Electorate 19,019
| Party | Candidate | Votes | % | ±% |
|---|---|---|---|---|
| Conservative | Clifford Huxtable | 4,340 | 49.0 | |
| Labour | Kenneth King | 3,389 | 38.3 | |
| Liberal | Joan Harvey | 1,000 | 11.3 | |
| Communist | John Bennett | 131 | 1.5 | |
| Majority | | 951 | 10.7 | |
| Turnout | | | 46.6 | |
| Conservative hold | | Swing | 1.2 | |

1963 Birmingham City Council election Selly Oak Electorate 19,172
| Party | Candidate | Votes | % | ±% |
|---|---|---|---|---|
| Conservative | Horace Goodby | 3,792 | 42.6 | |
| Labour | James Loach | 3,041 | 34.2 | |
| Liberal | Joan Harvey | 1,873 | 21.1 | |
| Communist | John Bennett | 193 | 2.2 | |
| Majority | | 751 | 8.4 | |
| Turnout | | | 46.4 | |
| Conservative hold | | Swing | 3.8 | |

1962 Birmingham City Council election Selly Oak Electorate 19,349
| Party | Candidate | Votes | % | ±% |
|---|---|---|---|---|
| Conservative | Donald Lewis | 3.957 | 45.1 | |
| Labour | Brian Chambers | 2,550 | 29.1 | |
| Liberal | Joan Harvey | 2,033 | 23.2 | |
| Communist | John Bennett | 227 | 2.6 | |
| Majority | | 1,407 | 16.1 | |
| Turnout | | | 45.3 | |
| Conservative hold | | Swing | | |

1961 Birmingham City Council election Selly Oak Electorate 21,111
| Party | Candidate | Votes | % | ±% |
|---|---|---|---|---|
| Conservative | Clifford Huxtable | 5,159 | 55.6 | |
| Labour | Shelia Mackenzie | 2,790 | 30.1 | |
| Liberal | Lionel King | 1,335 | 14.4 | |
| Majority | | 2,369 | 25.5 | |
| Turnout | | | 44.0 | |
| Conservative hold | | Swing | 1.0 | |

1960 Birmingham City Council election Selly Oak Electorate 21,177
| Party | Candidate | Votes | % | ±% |
|---|---|---|---|---|
| Conservative | Harry Glanvill | 5,217 | 56.5 | |
| Labour | Sheila Mackenzie | 2,703 | 29.3 | |
| Liberal | Joan Winter | 1,318 | 14.3 | |
| Majority | | 2,424 | 27.4 | |
| Turnout | | | 43.6 | |
| Conservative hold | | Swing | 7.1 | |

=== 1950s ===
1959 Birmingham City Council election Selly Oak Electorate 21,369
| Party | Candidate | Votes | % | ±% |
|---|---|---|---|---|
| Conservative | Donald Lewis | 6,234 | 56.7 | |
| Labour | William Pringle | 4,770 | 43.4 | |
| Majority | | 1,464 | 13.3 | |
| Turnout | | | 51.5 | |
| Conservative gain from Labour | | Swing | 3.5 | |

1958 Birmingham City Council election Selly Oak Electorate 21,387
| Party | Candidate | Votes | % | ±% |
|---|---|---|---|---|
| Conservative | Clifford Huxtable | 5,582 | 53.2 | |
| Labour | Elizabeth MacDonald | 4,920 | 46.9 | |
| Majority | | 662 | 6.3 | |
| Turnout | | | 49.1 | |
| Conservative hold | | Swing | 3.9 | |

1957 Birmingham City Council election Selly Oak Electorate 21,769
| Party | Candidate | Votes | % | ±% |
|---|---|---|---|---|
| Conservative | Edward Richardson | 6,037 | 57.1 | |
| Labour | Albert Bennett | 4,545 | 43.0 | |
| Majority | | 1,492 | 14.1 | |
| Turnout | | | 48.6 | |
| Conservative hold | | Swing | 8.8 | |

1956 Birmingham City Council election Selly Oak Electorate 22,139
| Party | Candidate | Votes | % | ±% |
|---|---|---|---|---|
| Labour | Florence Hammond | 5,569 | 51.7 | |
| Conservative | Clifford Huxtable | 5,196 | 48.3 | |
| Majority | | 371 | 3.5 | |
| Turnout | | | 48.6 | |
| Labour gain from Conservative | | Swing | 7.1 | |

1955 Birmingham City Council election Selly Oak Electorate 22,372
| Party | Candidate | Votes | % | ±% |
|---|---|---|---|---|
| Conservative | William Lygo | 6,506 | 53.5 | |
| Labour | Florence Hammond | 5,203 | 42.8 | |
| Liberal | Maurice King | 447 | 3.7 | |
| Majority | | 1,303 | 10.7 | |
| Turnout | | | 54.3 | |
| Conservative gain from Labour | | Swing | 1.4 | |

1954 Birmingham City Council election Selly Oak Electorate 22,529
| Party | Candidate | Votes | % | ±% |
|---|---|---|---|---|
| Conservative | Edward Richardson | 6,409 | 56.7 | |
| Labour | Frederick Reed | 4,890 | 43.3 | |
| Majority | | 1,519 | 13.4 | |
| Turnout | | | 50.2 | |
| Conservative hold | | Swing | 2.5 | |

1953 Birmingham City Council election Selly Oak Electorate 22,857
| Party | Candidate | Votes | % | ±% |
|---|---|---|---|---|
| Conservative | Harold Gurden | 6,610 | 54.2 | |
| Labour | Frederick Reed | 5,584 | 45.8 | |
| Majority | | 1,026 | 8.4 | |
| Turnout | | | 53.4 | |
| Conservative hold | | Swing | 8.7 | |

1952 Birmingham City Council election Selly Oak Electorate 23,048
| Party | Candidate | Votes | % | ±% |
|---|---|---|---|---|
| Labour | Florence Hammond | 7,200 | 54.5 | |
| Conservative | Edward Southam | 6,009 | 45.5 | |
| Majority | | 1,191 | 9.0 | |
| Turnout | | | 57.3 | |
| Labour gain from Conservative | | Swing | 16.4 | |

1951 Birmingham City Council election Selly Oak Electorate 23,192
| Party | Candidate | Votes | % | ±% |
|---|---|---|---|---|
| Conservative | Edward Rinbest | 7,430 | 61.9 | |
| Labour | William Wiggins | 4,582 | 38.2 | |
| Majority | | 2,848 | 23.7 | |
| Turnout | | | 51.8 | |
| Conservative hold | | Swing | 5.2 | |

1950 Birmingham City Council election Selly Oak Electorate 23,261
| Party | Candidate | Votes | % | ±% |
|---|---|---|---|---|
| Conservative | Harold Gurden | 7,066 | 56.6 | |
| Labour | John Bolas | 5,409 | 43.4 | |
| Majority | | 1,657 | 13.3 | |
| Turnout | | | 53.6 | |
| Conservative hold | | Swing | 0.5 | |

=== 1940s ===
1949 Birmingham City Council election Selly Oak Electorate 24,393
| Party | Candidate | Votes | % | ±% |
|---|---|---|---|---|
| Conservative | Edward Southam | 8,102 | 56.1 | |
| Labour | Florence Hammond | 6,340 | 43.9 | |
| Majority | | 1,762 | 12.2 | |
| Turnout | | | 59.2 | |
| Conservative gain from Labour | | Swing | 4.0 | |

1947 Birmingham City Council election Selly Oak Electorate 24,460
| Party | Candidate | Votes | % | ±% |
|---|---|---|---|---|
| Conservative | Edward Richardson | 8,817 | 60.1 | |
| Labour | Joseph Rhydderch | 5,866 | 40.0 | |
| Majority | | 2,951 | 20.1 | |
| Turnout | | | 60.0 | |
| Conservative hold | | Swing | 9.6 | |

1946 Birmingham City Council election Selly Oak Electorate 24,002
| Party | Candidate | Votes | % | ±% |
|---|---|---|---|---|
| Conservative | Harold Gurden | 6,263 | 50.5 | |
| Labour | Joseph Rhydderch | 6,147 | 49.5 | |
| Majority | | 116 | 0.9 | |
| Turnout | | | 51.7 | |
| Conservative hold | | Swing | 18.6 | |

Selly Oak by-election 29 November 1945 Electorate 23,148
| Party | Candidate | Votes | % | ±% |
|---|---|---|---|---|
| Labour | Florence Hammond | 5,378 | 58.4 | |
| Conservative | Harold Gurden | 3,829 | 41.6 | |
| Majority | | 1,549 | 16.8 | |
| Turnout | | | 39.8 | |
| Labour hold | | Swing | 9.7 | |

1945 Birmingham City Council election Selly Oak Electorate 23,148
| Party | Candidate | Votes | % | ±% |
|---|---|---|---|---|
| Labour | Albert Bradbeer | 7,633 | 68.1 | |
| Conservative | Harold Gurden | 3,574 | 31.9 | |
| Majority | | 4,059 | 36.2 | |
| Turnout | | | 48.4 | |
| Labour hold | | Swing | 19.0 | |

== See also ==
- Birmingham City Council elections
