= Najma Hafeez =

British politician

Najma Hafeez is a British politician. She was the first Asian Muslim woman to be an elected Councillor on Birmingham City Council and stood for the role of Mayor of West Midlands in 2016. She was born in Pakistan, moving to the UK with her parents in the 1960s.

== Early life ==
Najma moved the UK in 1964 taking up residence in Birmingham. She took responsibility for her younger siblings due to the ill health of her mother, and she initially faced discrimination in her school life. However, she and her family made a positive effort to become part of their mainly white community, with her father being a strong labour supporter. Despite being married at the age of 18 she retained the ambition to achieve a higher education and her own career.

== Political life ==
After divorcing her first husband she gained a degree and joined the Labour party. Her first council seat in 1984 was to the represent the ward of Fox Hollies. In 2016, her bid to become Mayor of West Midlands was not successful, as she was not shortlisted in the final selection.
