= Chaman Lal (politician) =

English politician

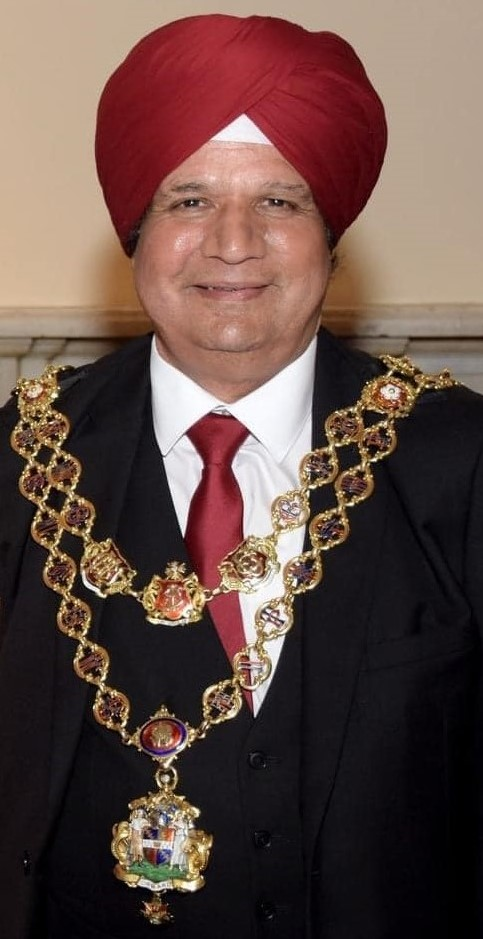
- Chaman Lal as the Lord Mayor of Birmingham

113th Lord Mayor of Birmingham
- In office 23 May 2023 – 22 May 2024
- Deputy: Shafique Shah
- Preceded by: Maureen Cornish
- Succeeded by: Ken Wood

Member of Birmingham City Council for Soho & Jewellery Quarter
- In office 6 May 1994 – 6 May 2026

Personal details
- Born: Pakhowal, Hoshiarpur, India
- Party: Labour (since 1989), Independent (2023-2024)
- Spouse: Vidya Wati (m. 1971)

Chaman Lal is a British Labour Party politician and former Lord Mayor of Birmingham.

He took the oath for the role of Birmingham Lord Mayor on 23 May 2023.

He is the first person of British Indian origin to be elected for this designation.

== Early life ==
Chaman Lal was born in a Ravidassia Sikh family in village Pakhowal in Hoshiarpur district as a son of Sardar Harnam Singh, a British Indian army officer who served in Italy during the Second World War and his mother Sardarni Jai Kaur. His uncle, Sardar Ram Singh was also a British Indian army officer who was killed in the Burma campaign.

== Political life ==
He has been a councillor for the ward of Soho & Jewellery Quarter since 1994. He joined the Labour Party in 1989.

In December 2023, during his time as Lord Mayor of Birmingham, Lal attended the opening of Elec Training, a new electrical training centre in Wolverhampton. He joined the Mayor of Wolverhampton, Councillor Dr. Michael Hardacre, to support local skills development in the region.

In July 2025, Lal was one of many Labour councillors in the city that were axed by the Party and told that they were not allowed to stand again in the next election. In the 2026 Birmingham City Council election, Lal stood as an independent in the Handsworth ward, but was not elected.

== Personal life ==
Lal married his wife Vidya in 1971, and they had three daughters and two sons.
