= Mike Whitby =

British politician (born 1948)

The Right Honourable The Lord Whitby
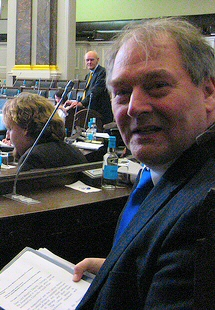
- Mike Whitby in the Council Chamber, Birmingham

Leader of Birmingham City Council
- In office June 2004 – 3 May 2012
- Preceded by: Albert Bore
- Succeeded by: Sir Albert Bore

Member of Birmingham City Council for Harborne
- In office 11 September 1997 – 22 May 2014
- Preceded by: Anthony Rust
- Succeeded by: John Alden

Member of the House of Lords
- Lord Temporal
- Life peerage 10 September 2013

Personal details
- Born: 6 February 1948 (age 78)
- Party: Conservative

Michael John Whitby, Baron Whitby (born 6 February 1948) is an English Conservative Party politician and former leader of Birmingham City Council, a post he held from June 2004 to May 2012. Until 2014 he was one of three councillors representing the Harborne ward in the west of the city. He was formerly a Councillor on Sandwell Metropolitan Borough Council. It was announced that he would be made a working peer by David Cameron on 1 August 2013.

Whitby was educated in Smethwick at James Watt Technical Grammar School, and also at Michael's Hoven College in the then West Germany. He then undertook a period of voluntary work in Germany, helping to rebuild communities destroyed during World War II. He has worked in the cultural sector in Liverpool, and also lectured in Business and Management Studies. He is currently chairman and managing director of Skeldings, a Smethwick-based engineering company, which was the winner of the Birmingham Post Business Award in June 2001.

A Fellow of the Institute of Directors Whitby is also President of Marketing Birmingham, Chairman of Birmingham Science Park, Aston and a board member of the National Exhibition Centre the West Midlands Regional Development Agency Advantage West Midlands, and the Greater Birmingham & Solihull Local Enterprise Partnership. In the past he has also served as Director of various regional organisations, including the Engineering Employers Federation, the Chamber of Commerce, the Birmingham City Region and the Federation of Small Businesses.

== History in politics ==
Whitby joined the Conservative Party in 1979. He first stood as a candidate in the Midlands West European by-election in 1987, again for Midlands West in the European Parliament Elections in 1989, and then as a Westminster Parliamentary candidate for Delyn in 1992. Even though on all 3 occasions he was unsuccessful in being elected he did significantly improve the Conservative vote in the first two. He achieved elected office in 1997, on winning the Harborne ward of Birmingham in a by-election, succeeding Labour councillor Anthony Rust whose resignation had triggered the election. He retained the seat until 2014.

In 1998, Whitby became the Deputy Leader of Conservative Group in Birmingham City Council, eventually becoming Group Leader in 2003. Following the 2004 Local Elections Whitby became Leader of the Council after forming a coalition with the Liberal Democrat Party in an arrangement Whitby described as a "Progressive Partnership".

Whitby's Progressive Partnership's control of the Council was threatened in the Local Elections of 2011, as the Conservatives lost 6 seats and the Liberal Democrats lost 7 seats making the Labour Party the largest Group in the Council overall with 55 seats. Whitby's colleagues suggested they were a victim of national issues playing out in the local elections, but commentators still suggested the 2012 Local Elections could be the last for the coalition. Labour gained control of the council after the 2012 election.

On 10 September 2013, he was created a life peer taking the title of Baron Whitby, of Harborne in the City of Birmingham.

== History as leader of Birmingham City Council ==
Whitby describes the mandate for the Progressive Partnership as a challenge to:

- "Deliver a low taxation environment
- Turn around failing Council services
- Raise the quality of life
- Unlock the infrastructure projects which had been mired by indecision
- Transform Birmingham City Council into an organisation fit for the 21st century
- Enhance Birmingham's reputation"

Whitby has been involved in a number of large infrastructure projects in Birmingham, including the £189 m Library of Birmingham project, which was due to open to the public on 3 September 2013. The new Library, which is designed by Mecanoo architects, will be one of Europe's largest public libraries upon completion and lead to the demolition of the old library building, paving the way for a £500,000 redevelopment of Birmingham's Paradise Circus area. Whitby was also involved in helping bring about the £600 million redevelopment of Birmingham's New Street Station in partnership with Network Rail, Advantage West Midlands and Centro.

At times, Whitby has attracted headlines as a result of comments he has made in public. In 2006, he made a written apology to newly elected Respect Councillor Salma Yaqoob following remarks he made that she would be "better off in Oldham or Burnley". Yaqoob had criticised the Council leadership for the absence of Black or Asian Councillors in the Council Cabinet or in senior positions such as Chairs of Scrutiny Committees.

In February 2007, Whitby withdrew remarks which attracted the attention of mental health charity Mind. In a council debate, he accused Labour Councillors of suffering from schizophrenia. In the same debate, a Cabinet colleague also described the Labour Councillors of suffering senile dementia. Following media attention, Whitby issued a partial apology.

In December 2007, he criticised the study of a Tory think tank headed by former Conservative Party Leader Iain Duncan Smith to be "error-ridden, inaccurate, out of date and misleading". The report claimed the Council needed to tackle crushing poverty and unemployment before it could hail Birmingham as a great city.

== Whitby on Elected Mayors ==
The issue of Elected Mayors in major cities has followed Whitby since he entered politics in Birmingham. In 2001 he was part of the "no campaign" which successfully campaigned against the introduction of mayors in Birmingham, whilst in 2006 and 2007 his relationship with David Cameron was reportedly strained as Whitby was identified as an opponent of the Conservative policy of directly elected mayors running large cities in England. Whitby was said to have described the debate around elected mayors as "puerile" and disputed the idea that support for the idea would form part of the forthcoming Conservative Party manifesto. At that time the Birmingham Mail campaigned in favour of a referendum for an elected Mayor for Birmingham but the campaign failed to attract anywhere near the level of public interest needed.

More recently there have been suggestions Whitby's position has softened considerably on the issue of Mayors. Having not publicly discussed his stance on the issue since 2007, in 2012 press reports have appeared suggesting Whitby may stand as the Conservative candidate for Birmingham should there be a "yes" to the referendum planned in the City to coincide with the May local elections, Birmingham voted no in the referendum.

Political offices
Preceded by Sir Albert Bore	Leader of Birmingham City Council; 2004 – 2012	Succeeded by Sir Albert Bore
Orders of precedence in the United Kingdom
Preceded by The Lord Bourne of Aberystwyth	Gentlemen; Baron Whitby	Followed by The Lord Finkelstein
