= Albert Bore =

British physicist and politician (born 1946)

Sir Albert Bore
- Bore in 2012

Leader of Birmingham City Council
- In office 3 May 2012 – 1 December 2015
- Preceded by: Mike Whitby
- Succeeded by: John Clancy
- In office May 1999 – May 2004
- Preceded by: Theresa Stewart
- Succeeded by: Mike Whitby

Member of Birmingham City Council for Ladywood
- In office 1 May 1980 – 7 May 2026

Personal details
- Born: 1946 (age 79–80) Ayrshire, Scotland
- Party: Labour
- Occupation: Politician; Academic

Sir Albert Bore (born 1946) is a British nuclear physicist, academic and Labour Party politician.

Bore has a doctorate in nuclear reactor physics from the University of Birmingham and worked as a lecturer in nuclear physics at Aston University from 1974 to 1999. He served as a member of Birmingham City Council for Ladywood ward between 1980 to 2026. He led the Labour Party group between 1999 and 2015, serving as Leader of the Council from 1999 to 2004 and from 2012 to 2015. On 22 October 2015, Bore resigned as Leader effective 1 December, when he was succeeded by his Labour party colleague John Clancy.

He retired at the 2026 local elections.

== Career ==
=== Academic career ===
Bore was born in 1946 in Ayrshire, Scotland. He moved to Birmingham in 1969 to study for a doctorate in nuclear reactor physics at the University of Birmingham. He was a lecturer in nuclear physics at Aston University from 1974 to 1999. In addition to his PhD, he holds an honorary doctorate from the University of Aston.

=== Political career ===
Bore stood for Labour in the first direct elections for the European Parliament in June 1979 but lost the Birmingham South constituency to the Conservatives.

In 1980, Bore was elected to Birmingham City Council from the Ladywood ward, quickly gaining a reputation as a "left-wing firebrand". He has been re-elected ever since and is the longest-serving member of the Council. Bore has been a leading proponent of devolution and localism agendas in local governance since entering politics in 1974. He has published and lectured widely across Europe and internationally on the subject of city-building, urban renewal, devolution and local governance.

In 1981 Bore was selected to replace sitting M.P. John Sever as Labour parliamentary candidate in Birmingham Ladywood but parliamentary boundary changes before the 1983 General Election caused a new selection to be held, and Bore lost out to Clare Short who had been selected for the neighbouring constituency of Birmingham Handsworth which merged to form the new Birmingham Ladywood constituency.

He is an elected Councillor for the Birmingham Ladywood ward (1980–), and was leader of the Labour Group of Birmingham City Council (1999–2015; succeeding Theresa Stewart), Leader of Birmingham City Council (2012–2015 and 1999–2004) and Chair of the Economic Development portfolio. He was the Chair of the University Hospitals Birmingham NHS Foundation Trust (2006–13). He is an elected member of the European Union's Committee of the Regions (CoR; 1992–) and its former president (2002–2004). He is a director of the Greater Birmingham & Solihull Local Enterprise Partnership.

He stood for Birmingham Selly Oak in the 1987 general election, losing to Conservative incumbent Anthony Beaumont-Dark by 20,721 votes (39.3%) to 23,305 (44.2%).

As Chair of Economic Development and Leader of Birmingham City Council, he was responsible for shaping the major social and economic regeneration of Birmingham during the 1980s and 1990s. This included the negotiation and delivery of one of the first public private partnerships in the UK with the then Conservative government and channelling-in European regional aid funding. This provided infrastructural leverage and partnerships that made him directly involved in the creation of the International Convention Centre (ICC), the National Indoor Arena (NIA), Birmingham's Symphony Hall, the re-development of Brindleyplace and refurbishment of The Mailbox and canalsides in the central area of Birmingham, the pedestrianisation of New Street and removal of the "concrete collar" road network in the central Birmingham area and the redevelopment of the Bull Ring, now one of the busiest shopping areas in the UK.

In 1986 Bore formed the Eurocities network between the cities of Birmingham, Barcelona, Frankfurt, Milan, Lyon and Rotterdam.

As a member of the EU-Committee of the Regions since its creation in 1992, he has drafted legislative opinions on behalf of local government across Europe on issues including, the European Convention of Human Rights, the Lisbon Treaty, EU-Enlargement, EU-Economic, Social and Territorial Cohesion Policies and the European Union budget.

=== Business career ===
Bore is a non-executive director of Birmingham Symphony Hall, Optima Community Housing Association, Marketing Birmingham, National Exhibition Centre Limited, Colmore Business District Ltd and Birmingham Technology Ltd. From 1999 to 2004 he was a board member of the West Midlands Regional Development Agency.

== Personal life ==
Bore has a daughter and a grandson from his first marriage. He also has two adult sons from his second marriage to Najma Hafeez, a management consultant, former Birmingham City Councillor and former Chairwoman of City Hospital. In 1995 he was acquitted of assault after she accused him of throwing coffee in her face. In 2002, Bore met Victoria Quinn in Brussels as he attended the Committee of the Regions. They began dating shortly after and married in 2014. Quinn was also a Councillor, for the Sparkbrook ward, to which she was elected in a November 2011 by-election to succeed Salma Yaqoob. Quinn stood for Druids Heat ward following boundary changes in 2018 but was defeated.

Bore was knighted in the 2002 New Year honours for services to local government.

Political offices
Preceded by Theresa Stewart	Leader of Birmingham City Council; 1999 to 2004	Succeeded by Mike Whitby
Preceded by Mike Whitby	Leader of Birmingham City Council; 2012 to 2015	Succeeded by John Clancy
