= Either Way =

Either Way may refer to:

- Either way or hybrid offence, in criminal law
- Either Way (film), a 2011 Icelandic comedy film
- Either Way (album), by Zoot Sims and Al Cohn, 1961
- "Either Way" (Chris Stapleton song), 2017
- "Either Way" (K. Michelle song), 2017
- "Either Way" (Snakehips and Anne-Marie song), 2017
- "Either Way" (The Twang song), 2007
- "Either Way" (Wilco song), 2007
- "Either Way" (Ive song), 2023
