= Ice Cream Sundae (disambiguation) =

Ice cream sundae is a dessert.

Ice Cream Sundae may refer to:

- "Ice Cream Sundae", a song by The Twang from Love It When I Feel Like This (2007)
- "Ice Cream Sundae", an episode of the television series Teletubbies
