= The Twang =

English indie rock band

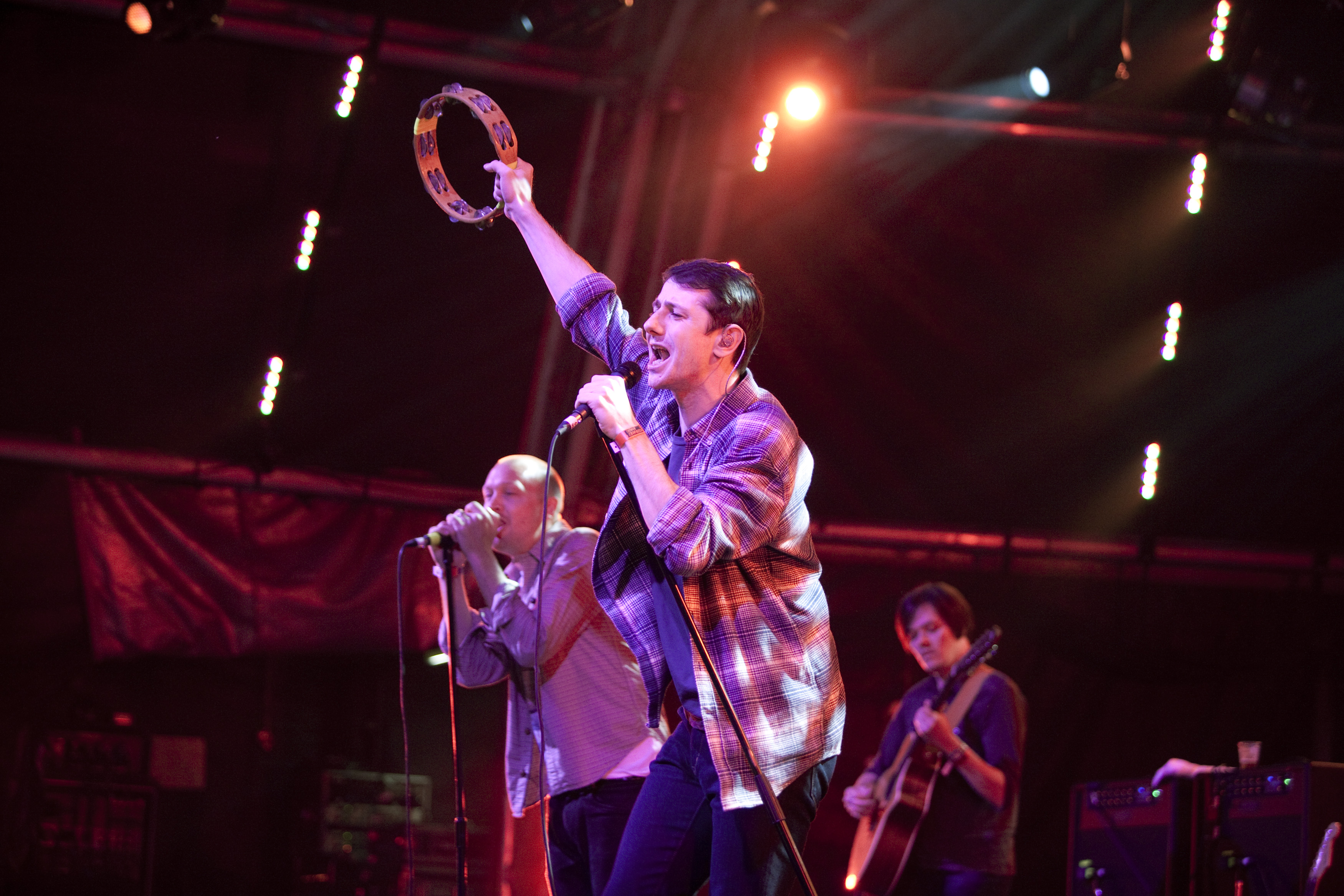
- The Twang perform at ArtsFest in Birmingham

Background information
- Origin: Birmingham, England
- Genre: Indie rock
- Years active: 2004–present
- Labels: B-Unique (UK), Jump the Cut Records, Arena Rock Recording Co. (US)
- Members: Phil Etheridge; Jon Watkin; Ash Sheehan; Stu Hartland
- Past members: Martin Saunders; Jimmy Jazz; Baz Fratelli; Matty Clinton; Tommy Greaves; Alex Godfrey; Cat Mctigue; Rio Hellyer
- Website: Official website

The Twang are an English indie rock band, formed in 2004 in Birmingham. The band have released five studio albums - Love It When I Feel Like This (2007), Jewellery Quarter (2009), 10:20 (2012), Neon Twang (2014), If Confronted Just Go Mad (2019) and a B-sides compilation, Subscription (2017). Consisting of vocalist and guitarist Phil Etheridge, bassist Jon Watkin, guitarist Stu Hartland and drummer Ash Sheehan, the band garnered national acclaim when NME magazine produced an article on music acts in the West Midlands. The band's original line-up consisted of Etheridge and Martin Saunders, Watkin, Hartland & Matty Clinton on drums.

The band's debut single, "Wide Awake", was released on 19 March 2007, with their debut album Love It When I Feel Like This released on 4 June 2007. The album reached #3 in the UK charts.

The Twang's second album, Jewellery Quarter, was released 3 August 2009 and reached #20 on the UK album chart. The album was produced by Neil Claxton of Mint Royale at Blueprint Studios in Salford. Third album 10:20 was released on 29 October 2012, reaching a chart placing of #52.

Neon Twang was released on 10 March 2014. This was the last studio album to feature Martin Saunders, who left in 2018 after the Love It When I Feel Like This 10th anniversary tour, which saw the band play their debut album in full. The Twang announced their fifth studio album If Confronted Just Go Mad in November 2019, featuring new female backing singer Cat Mctigue.

== Biography ==
=== Formation and Neon Twang years (2004–2007) ===
The band was formed in Quinton, Birmingham by singer (and then guitarist) Phil Etheridge and bassist Jon Watkin after the pair studied music technology together at Kidderminster College. They originally performed in and around Birmingham under the name "Neon Twang". During this period, Etheridge and Watkin often swapped instruments. The addition of guitarist Stu Hartland in late 2005 enabled Watkin to take over bass duties permanently and allowed Etheridge to perform live without playing guitar. The name Neon Twang was eventually dropped by the managers of the band, as the name had become notorious for fights at gigs, and a new name was needed to change the image of the band, so they became just 'The Twang'.

=== Love It When I Feel Like This (2007–2008) ===
The Twang eventually signed to independent record label B-Unique in 2007. The label was also home to other bands including Kaiser Chiefs, The Automatic and The Ordinary Boys.

The band embarked on a 19 date tour in February and March 2007, starting at the Lucorum in Barnsley and ending at Carling Academy in their hometown of Birmingham.

Their debut single release, "Wide Awake" was released on 19 March 2007. The single reached number 15 on the UK Singles Chart and was followed by the second single "Either Way" on 28 May 2007 which reached number 8 on the UK Singles Chart and is their biggest hit song to date. The single received heavy radio play and was championed by BBC Radio 1 DJs such as Edith Bowman, Jo Whiley and Chris Moyles.

In April 2007, the band received their first NME cover and two months later were the subject of a BBC Radio 1 documentary. The band were hailed by the NME as "Britain's Best New Band" and won the Phillip Hall Radar Award at the 2007 NME Awards. They were invited to join James on their UK tour in the same month, which saw them play at the 21,000 capacity Manchester Evening News Arena. The Twang toured the UK again in May 2007 starting on 8 May in Cardiff and finishing on 31 May in London.

Their debut album Love It When I Feel Like This was released on 4 June 2007. The record landed in the UK Album Chart at number 3. This was followed by slots at major festivals such as Wireless Festival, Glastonbury, T in the Park, Summer Sonic in Japan, & Reading and Leeds Festivals. The Twang sold out many large venues on their autumn tour 2007, most notably the 5,000 capacity Brixton Academy. Towards the end of 2007, the band released a new single "Two Lovers". The music video for which featured the band alongside actor Danny Dyer and actress Jaime Winstone as a pair of dysfunctional sweethearts. The band also toured extensively in 2008 and played V Festival on 16 and 17 August 2008.

The band also worked with The Streets on a remix of their hit single "Either Way", which featured rapper Professor Green.

=== Jewellery Quarter (2009–2010) ===
In January 2008, the Twang decamped to the isle of Anglesey, where they hired a cottage and began writing for their second studio album Jewellery Quarter. The band have described this period as a magical time in their career. In March 2008, the band began recording the album in Granada, Spain with Killing Joke bassist and music producer, Youth. They completed the album the following month at ‘Blueprint Studio’s in Salford, with Mint Royale's Neil Claxton. The album was named after the area in Birmingham in which the band were now resident. The artwork was the idea of critically acclaimed Wolverhampton artist Temper who, unknown to the band was also resident in the Jewellery Quarter. The Twang first showcased a number of new songs at the Rainbow, Birmingham on 22 May. "Another Bus" was the first new single from the album and was released by the band as a free download. Barney Rubble was the next single to follow, which reached #50 in the UK charts and featured a sample from classic 1990s dance track "Give It Up" by The Goodmen. The album was then released on 3 August 2009 and reached #20 in the UK charts.

Several of the band's songs have been used on various TV programmes. "Twit Twoo" was used on Match of the Day. "Barney Rubble" was used on ITV when they showed the group standings and results after, before or at half-time in their football matches. "Back Where We Started" was used on ITV as part of their football shows/matches. "Reap What You Sow" and "Ice Cream Sundae" have also been used at various times on the BBC.

The Twang toured the UK in the autumn of 2009 in support of Jewellery Quarter. The tour started in Crewe on 30 September, and ended in Middlesbrough on 19 October.

The band visited USA for the first time in December 2009 and January 2010, and they played in Miami, Florida & Portland, Oregon.

=== Guapa EP and 10:20 (2011–2013) ===
In January 2010, band announced that Stu Hartland would become a part-time member, but he still played with the band live. They enlisted new guitarist Jimmy Jazz (before Hartland became a full-time member of the band again in 2012).

In Summer 2010, The Twang began writing and recording new material with guitarist and producer Jon ‘Simmo’ Simcox. The band announced on 1 February 2011 via Facebook that they would be releasing a new EP titled Guapa on 14 February 2011. The physical release was limited to 1,000 copies. They joined Happy Mondays' lead singer Shaun Ryder on his solo tour in February 2011. Their Weekend Offender tour in September and October saw the band play cities such as Glasgow, London, Birmingham, Newcastle, Leeds, Sheffield, Liverpool and the tour ended in Manchester on 22 October.

They played V Festival on 18, 19 and 21 August 2012, the band announced that they would release their third album, entitled 10:20, on 29 October 2012. The title came from a note that an irate studio neighbour had left sellotaped to their studio door. The band also announced that original drummer Matty Clinton had left the band, and had been replaced by Ash Sheehan. 10:20 reached #52 in the charts, and featured singles such as "Paradise", "We're A Crowd" & "Mainline".

The Twang played the single "We're A Crowd" at the Etihad Stadium on 9 March 2013 before the Manchester City v Barnsley FA Cup fixture. The Twang embarked on a co-headline tour with the band Cast in April and May 2013, before their own short 7-date tour in September and October later in the year. The band ended the year with 2 intimate gigs in Birmingham on 22 and 23 December.

=== Neon Twang (2014–2016) ===
On 14 January 2014, the band announced the album Neon Twang, which was released on 10 March 2014, again via Jump the Cut Records. The title refers to the band's previous name when starting out. On the same day they revealed a new video for single "Larry Lizard" to support the LP. The band also started working with fellow Birmingham based, Wide Eyed guitarist Tommy Greaves who was to accompany them on their February 2014 Tour, which saw them play at smaller, more intimate venues. The singles "The Wobble" and "New Love" were also released. The Twang joined The Libertines at Hyde Park in London for their big reunion show on 5 July. They ended the year by joining The Enemy on a 12-date co-headline tour in December.

The Twang played fewer shows in 2015, including a gig with The Wonder Stuff in Wolverhampton on 5 July, and a show at O2 Academy Birmingham on 19 December.

The band supported Ocean Colour Scene at their Moseley Park shows, along with Reverend and The Makers, and The Sherlocks on 15 & 16 July 2016. The Twang released a Christmas single, "On the 24th", on 1 December, which was their first release in over 2 years. They played O2 Academy Leicester and O2 Academy in their hometown Birmingham on 16 & 17 December respectively.

=== Love It When I Feel Like This 10th Anniversary Tour (2017–2018) ===
On 2 May 2017, the band announced a new tour to mark the 10 year anniversary of their seminal debut album Love It When I Feel Like This. The tour consisted of 11 dates across the UK in November/December 2017 and saw the band perform the album in its entirety for the first time ever. The tour started in Bournemouth on 29 November and ended in Birmingham on 23 December, however a rescheduled show in Liverpool on 20 January meant the tour included one final show in 2018.

The Twang released a 16-track best of album called Either Way, It's The Best Of The Twang in early November 2017, and a b-sides compilation entitled Subscription later in the month.

However, in September 2018, the band announced via social media that singer Martin Saunders was to leave the band, which meant Phil Etheridge took up a full-time solo singing role. The band played at Castlefield Bowl on 29 June, supporting Shed Seven.

The Twang played 5 dates in December 2018 in Sheffield, Birmingham, Manchester, London and Glasgow, as part of their annual Christmas shows. The band hinted after these dates that new material was imminent.

=== If Confronted Just Go Mad (2019-present) ===
In February 2019, The Twang announced that they were to support Shed Seven on their mammoth 23-date Shedcember UK tour, including a show at Leeds First Direct Arena on 7 December. On May 13, the band announced on social media that they were releasing their first record in 5 years, titled 'If Confronted Just Go Mad', which was released on 8 November 2019.

They also released a new single “Everytime” on Friday 17 May. This single signalled a slight change in style for the band, as it was more pop-orientated, and the verses are split between new singer Cat Mctigue and Etheridge on lead vocals. The single however received positive reviews.

Their first show of 2019 was in Warrington at Neighbourhood Weekender on 25 May. They showcased more new material at the Borderline in London on 28 May, before they played at the Ural Music Night in Yekaterinburg, Russia on 28 June. The Twang returned to Godiva Festival in Coventry for the first time in 10 years, before supporting Doves in Brighton (along with The Coral & Feeder) and in Birmingham (with Johnny Marr & The Coral). On 1 August the band were announced to play the Neighbourhood Festival in Manchester on 12 October, and their second single from the upcoming album, "Dream" was released on 2 August. They ended their run of summer festivals by supporting Kaiser Chiefs in Leicester and playing Victorious Festival in Portsmouth. The third single from the new album, a cover of The Blue Nile's 'Tinseltown in the Rain' was released on 18 September. The band were then added to the 2Q Festival in Lincoln on 9 November, and they also announced their annual Christmas Birmingham show at O2 Institute on 22 December, before a second date was announced on the 23rd after the first night sold out.

== Discography ==
=== Studio albums ===
List of studio albums, with selected chart positions and certifications
Title	Details	Peak chart positions				Certifications
Title	Details	UK	UK Indie	IRE	SCO	Certifications
Love It When I Feel Like This	Released: 4 June 2007; Label: B-Unique; Formats: CD, LP, digital download	3	39	74	3	BPI: Gold
Jewellery Quarter	Released: 3 August 2009; Label: B-Unique; Formats: CD, LP, digital download	20	16	—	39	
10:20	Released: 29 October 2012; Label: Jump The Cut; Formats: CD, LP, digital download	52	12	—	51	
Neon Twang	Released: 10 March 2014; Label: Jump The Cut; Formats: CD, LP, digital download	57	10	—	96	
If Confronted Just Go Mad	Released: 8 November 2019; Label: Jump The Cut; Formats: CD, LP, digital download	— (Note: If Confronted Just Go Mad did not enter the UK Albums Chart, but peaked at number 69 on the UK Albums Sales Chart.)	15	—	—	
"—" denotes a recording that did not chart or was not released in that territory.

=== Compilations ===
List of compilation albums, with selected chart positions
Title	Details	Peak chart positions
Title	Details	UK Indie
Either Way, It's the Best of The Twang	Released: 3 November 2017; Label: Jump The Cut; Formats: CD, LP, digital download	13
Subscription	Released: 17 November 2017; Label: Jump The Cut; Formats: CD, LP, digital download	—
"—" denotes a recording that did not chart or was not released in that territory.

=== EPs ===
List of EPs, with selected chart positions
Title	Details	Peak chart positions
Title	Details	UK Phys.
Guapa	Released: 14 February 2011; Label: Jump The Cut; Formats: CD, digital download	—
Amsterdam	Released: 28 February 2020; Label: Jump The Cut; Formats: 10", digital download	3
"—" denotes a recording that did not chart or was not released in that territory.

=== Singles ===
Title	Year	Peak chart positions				Album
Title	Year	UK	UK Indie	EU	SCO	Album
"Wide Awake"	2007	15	—	—	5	Love It When I Feel Like This
"Either Way"	2007	8	—	27	6	Love It When I Feel Like This
"Two Lovers"	2007	34	—	—	22	Love It When I Feel Like This
"Push the Ghosts" / "Drinking in L.A"	2007	63	—	—	19	Love It When I Feel Like This
"Another Bus"	2009	—	—	—	—	Jewellery Quarter
"Barney Rubble"	2009	59	—	—	13	Jewellery Quarter
"Encouraging Sign"	2009	—	—	—	—	Jewellery Quarter
"Paradise"	2011	—	—	—	—	10:20
"We're a Crowd"	2012	—	46	—	—	10:20
"Mainline"	2012	—	—	—	—	10:20
"Sheep"	2013	— (Note: "Sheep" did not enter the UK Singles Chart, but peaked at number 70 on the UK Physical Singles Chart.)	—	—	—	Non-album single
"Larry Lizard"	2014	—	—	—	—	Neon Twang
"The Wobble"	2014	—	—	—	—	Neon Twang
"New Love"	2014	—	—	—	—	Neon Twang
"On the 24th"	2016	—	—	—	—	Non-album single
"Everytime" / "Dream"	2019	— (Note: "Everytime" did not enter the UK Singles Chart, but peaked at number 10 on the UK Physical Singles Chart.)	—	—	—	If Confronted Just Go Mad
"It Feels Like (You're Wasting My Time)" / "Tinseltown in the Rain"	2019	— (Note: "It Feels Like (You're Wasting My Time)" did not enter the UK Singles Chart, but peaked at number 11 on the UK Physical Singles Chart.)	—	—	—	If Confronted Just Go Mad
"—" denotes a recording that did not chart or was not released in that territory.

=== Other charted songs ===
Title	Year	Peak chart positions	Album
Title	Year	UK	Album
"Lost My Smile"	2007	193	"Either Way" single
