= 10:20 =

10:20 may refer to:

- 10:20 (The Twang album), 2012
- 10:20 (Wire album), 2020
