= Moseley and Kings Heath (ward) =

Coordinates: 52.437°N 1.888°W

- Ward
- Location within the West Midlands
- Population: 25,669 (2011 Ward)
  - Density: 44.0 per ha
- OS grid reference: SP075822
- Metropolitan borough: Birmingham
- Metropolitan county: West Midlands
- Region: West Midlands
- Country: England
- Sovereign state: United Kingdom
- Post town: BIRMINGHAM
- Postcode district: B13
- Dialling code: 0121
- Police: West Midlands
- Fire: West Midlands
- Ambulance: West Midlands
- UK Parliament: Birmingham Hall Green

Moseley and Kings Heath is a ward within the constituency of Hall Green, covering the greater part of the Moseley and Kings Heath areas of Birmingham, England.

== Politics ==
The Moseley and Kings Heath Ward Committee is part of the official structure of Birmingham City Council and exists to discuss issues which affect life within the ward, mostly (although not exclusively) related to the activity of the council. The Committee comprises the two elected Ward Councillors for the area together with the Member of Parliament for the Hall Green, Moseley and King's Heath, Sparkbrook, and Springfield constituency, Roger Godsiff, of which the ward is part. However, meetings are well attended with all of those in attendance not only debating the issues of concern to them but voting on policy.

The Ward Committee works with The Moseley and Kings Heath Ward Advisory Board – a grouping of representatives from local groups and organisations – as a kind of executive for the full Ward Committee.

Moseley and Kings Heath Ward has adopted a Ward Support Officer with the current holder of the title being Muna Masood.

== Demographics ==
The 2001 Population Census recorded that there were 24,273 people living in the ward. 31.0% (7,520) are of an ethnic minority compared with 29.6% for Birmingham in general. White Irish are excluded from these figures, however.

== Transport ==
The Alcester Road (A435) passes through the ward and is major route linking the city centre with Redditch and the M40. The A445 and A4040 (Outer Ring Road) are also major roads in the area. Bus routes serving the area are the Number 1, Number 11, Number 35 and Number 50, operated by West Midlands Bus.

The Camp Hill railway line passes through the area however there are no railway stations on it. The area was served by Moseley railway station (opened 1867) and Kings Heath railway station (opened 1840), which were located on the line, however, these were both closed in 1941 along with the other stations on the line.

A reopening of the line has been considered by Birmingham City Council. A feasibility study has concluded that there is a strong economic case for reopening stations at Moseley, Kings Heath and in Hazelwell/ Stirchley. There was a recommendation against opening a railway station at Balsall Heath as it is close to the city centre, however, the report only looked at potential journeys from Balsall Heath going to the city centre and did not take into account people who want to travel to Balsall Heath from districts around the city.

== Places of interest ==
The ward covers two conservation areas; Moseley Village and St Agnes. These two areas include many larger residential properties reflecting the affluence of the areas. Other areas in the ward are disadvantaged though.

There are several open spaces within the ward including Cannon Hill Park in Moseley, Kings Heath Park and the private Moseley Park. Within Cannon Hill Park is mac (Midlands Art Centre) which is a non-profits art centre. Other places of interest include Moseley Golf Course and the gardens of Highbury Hall.

Kings Heath and Moseley Village serve as shopping centres for the ward. Kings Heath Library serves the area and hosts a monthly local history group.

== Ward Description ==
The ward covers an area of {} Birmingham, including the districts of {}.

== Ward history ==
The ward was created in {}, with the boundaries being unaltered until {}.

== Parliamentary Representation ==
The ward has been part of Birmingham {} constituency.

== Election results ==
=== 2000s ===
6 May 2010 Electorate Turnout %,
| Party | Candidate | Votes | % | ±% |
|---|---|---|---|---|
| Conservative | | | % | |
| Labour | | | % | |
| Liberal | | | % | |
| Independent | | | % | |
| Majority | | | % | |
| Labour gain from Liberal | | Swing | | |
| Conservative hold | | Swing | | |

7 May 2009 Electorate Turnout %,
| Party | Candidate | Votes | % | ±% |
|---|---|---|---|---|
| Conservative | | | % | |
| Labour | | | % | |
| Liberal | | | % | |
| Independent | | | % | |
| Majority | | | % | |
| Labour gain from Liberal | | Swing | | |
| Conservative hold | | Swing | | |

1 May 2008 Electorate Turnout %,
| Party | Candidate | Votes | % | ±% |
|---|---|---|---|---|
| Conservative | | | % | |
| Labour | | | % | |
| Liberal | | | % | |
| Independent | | | % | |
| Majority | | | % | |
| Labour gain from Liberal | | Swing | | |
| Conservative hold | | Swing | | |

3 May 2007 Electorate Turnout %,
| Party | Candidate | Votes | % | ±% |
|---|---|---|---|---|
| Conservative | | | % | |
| Labour | | | % | |
| Liberal | | | % | |
| Independent | | | % | |
| Majority | | | % | |
| Labour gain from Liberal | | Swing | | |
| Conservative hold | | Swing | | |

4 May 2006 Electorate Turnout %,
| Party | Candidate | Votes | % | ±% |
|---|---|---|---|---|
| Conservative | | | % | |
| Labour | | | % | |
| Liberal | | | % | |
| Independent | | | % | |
| Majority | | | % | |
| Labour gain from Liberal | | Swing | | |
| Conservative hold | | Swing | | |

5 May 2005 Electorate Turnout %,
| Party | Candidate | Votes | % | ±% |
|---|---|---|---|---|
| Conservative | | | % | |
| Labour | | | % | |
| Liberal | | | % | |
| Independent | | | % | |
| Majority | | | % | |
| Labour gain from Liberal | | Swing | | |
| Conservative hold | | Swing | | |

6 May 2004 Electorate Turnout %,
| Party | Candidate | Votes | % | ±% |
|---|---|---|---|---|
| Conservative | | | % | |
| Labour | | | % | |
| Liberal | | | % | |
| Independent | | | % | |
| Majority | | | % | |
| Labour gain from Liberal | | Swing | | |
| Conservative hold | | Swing | | |

1 May 2003 Electorate Turnout %,
| Party | Candidate | Votes | % | ±% |
|---|---|---|---|---|
| Conservative | | | % | |
| Labour | | | % | |
| Liberal | | | % | |
| Independent | | | % | |
| Majority | | | % | |
| Labour gain from Liberal | | Swing | | |
| Conservative hold | | Swing | | |

2 May 2002 Electorate Turnout %,
| Party | Candidate | Votes | % | ±% |
|---|---|---|---|---|
| Conservative | | | % | |
| Labour | | | % | |
| Liberal | | | % | |
| Independent | | | % | |
| Majority | | | % | |
| Labour gain from Liberal | | Swing | | |
| Conservative hold | | Swing | | |

7 June 2001 Electorate Turnout %,
| Party | Candidate | Votes | % | ±% |
|---|---|---|---|---|
| Conservative | | | % | |
| Labour | | | % | |
| Liberal | | | % | |
| Independent | | | % | |
| Majority | | | % | |
| Labour gain from Liberal | | Swing | | |
| Conservative hold | | Swing | | |

4 May 2000 Electorate Turnout %,
| Party | Candidate | Votes | % | ±% |
|---|---|---|---|---|
| Conservative | | | % | |
| Labour | | | % | |
| Liberal | | | % | |
| Independent | | | % | |
| Majority | | | % | |
| Labour gain from Liberal | | Swing | | |
| Conservative hold | | Swing | | |

=== 1990s ===
6 May 1999 Electorate Turnout %,
| Party | Candidate | Votes | % | ±% |
|---|---|---|---|---|
| Conservative | | | % | |
| Labour | | | % | |
| Liberal | | | % | |
| Independent | | | % | |
| Majority | | | % | |
| Labour gain from Liberal | | Swing | | |
| Conservative hold | | Swing | | |

7 May 1998 Electorate Turnout %,
| Party | Candidate | Votes | % | ±% |
|---|---|---|---|---|
| Conservative | | | % | |
| Labour | | | % | |
| Liberal | | | % | |
| Independent | | | % | |
| Majority | | | % | |
| Labour gain from Liberal | | Swing | | |
| Conservative hold | | Swing | | |

1 May 1997 Electorate Turnout %,
| Party | Candidate | Votes | % | ±% |
|---|---|---|---|---|
| Conservative | | | % | |
| Labour | | | % | |
| Liberal | | | % | |
| Independent | | | % | |
| Majority | | | % | |
| Labour gain from Liberal | | Swing | | |
| Conservative hold | | Swing | | |

2 May 1996 Electorate Turnout %,
| Party | Candidate | Votes | % | ±% |
|---|---|---|---|---|
| Conservative | | | % | |
| Labour | | | % | |
| Liberal | | | % | |
| Independent | | | % | |
| Majority | | | % | |
| Labour gain from Liberal | | Swing | | |
| Conservative hold | | Swing | | |

4 May 1995 Electorate Turnout %,
| Party | Candidate | Votes | % | ±% |
|---|---|---|---|---|
| Conservative | | | % | |
| Labour | | | % | |
| Liberal | | | % | |
| Independent | | | % | |
| Majority | | | % | |
| Labour gain from Liberal | | Swing | | |
| Conservative hold | | Swing | | |

5 May 1994 Electorate Turnout %,
| Party | Candidate | Votes | % | ±% |
|---|---|---|---|---|
| Conservative | | | % | |
| Labour | | | % | |
| Liberal | | | % | |
| Independent | | | % | |
| Majority | | | % | |
| Labour gain from Liberal | | Swing | | |
| Conservative hold | | Swing | | |

6 May 1993 Electorate Turnout %,
| Party | Candidate | Votes | % | ±% |
|---|---|---|---|---|
| Conservative | | | % | |
| Labour | | | % | |
| Liberal | | | % | |
| Independent | | | % | |
| Majority | | | % | |
| Labour gain from Liberal | | Swing | | |
| Conservative hold | | Swing | | |

7 May 1992 Electorate Turnout %,
| Party | Candidate | Votes | % | ±% |
|---|---|---|---|---|
| Conservative | | | % | |
| Labour | | | % | |
| Liberal | | | % | |
| Independent | | | % | |
| Majority | | | % | |
| Labour gain from Liberal | | Swing | | |
| Conservative hold | | Swing | | |

2 May 1991 Electorate Turnout %,
| Party | Candidate | Votes | % | ±% |
|---|---|---|---|---|
| Conservative | | | % | |
| Labour | | | % | |
| Liberal | | | % | |
| Independent | | | % | |
| Majority | | | % | |
| Labour gain from Liberal | | Swing | | |
| Conservative hold | | Swing | | |

3 May 1990 Electorate Turnout %,
| Party | Candidate | Votes | % | ±% |
|---|---|---|---|---|
| Conservative | | | % | |
| Labour | | | % | |
| Liberal | | | % | |
| Independent | | | % | |
| Majority | | | % | |
| Labour gain from Liberal | | Swing | | |
| Conservative hold | | Swing | | |

=== 1980s ===
4 May 1989 Electorate Turnout %,
| Party | Candidate | Votes | % | ±% |
|---|---|---|---|---|
| Conservative | | | % | |
| Labour | | | % | |
| Liberal | | | % | |
| Independent | | | % | |
| Majority | | | % | |
| Labour gain from Liberal | | Swing | | |
| Conservative hold | | Swing | | |

5 May 1988 Electorate Turnout %,
| Party | Candidate | Votes | % | ±% |
|---|---|---|---|---|
| Conservative | | | % | |
| Labour | | | % | |
| Liberal | | | % | |
| Independent | | | % | |
| Majority | | | % | |
| Labour gain from Liberal | | Swing | | |
| Conservative hold | | Swing | | |

7 May 1987 Electorate Turnout %,
| Party | Candidate | Votes | % | ±% |
|---|---|---|---|---|
| Conservative | | | % | |
| Labour | | | % | |
| Liberal | | | % | |
| Independent | | | % | |
| Majority | | | % | |
| Labour gain from Liberal | | Swing | | |
| Conservative hold | | Swing | | |

1 May 1986 Electorate Turnout %,
| Party | Candidate | Votes | % | ±% |
|---|---|---|---|---|
| Conservative | | | % | |
| Labour | | | % | |
| Liberal | | | % | |
| Independent | | | % | |
| Majority | | | % | |
| Labour gain from Liberal | | Swing | | |
| Conservative hold | | Swing | | |

2 May 1985 Electorate Turnout %,
| Party | Candidate | Votes | % | ±% |
|---|---|---|---|---|
| Conservative | | | % | |
| Labour | | | % | |
| Liberal | | | % | |
| Independent | | | % | |
| Majority | | | % | |
| Labour gain from Liberal | | Swing | | |
| Conservative hold | | Swing | | |

3 May 1984 Electorate Turnout %,
| Party | Candidate | Votes | % | ±% |
|---|---|---|---|---|
| Conservative | | | % | |
| Labour | | | % | |
| Liberal | | | % | |
| Independent | | | % | |
| Majority | | | % | |
| Labour gain from Liberal | | Swing | | |
| Conservative hold | | Swing | | |

5 May 1983 Electorate Turnout %,
| Party | Candidate | Votes | % | ±% |
|---|---|---|---|---|
| Conservative | | | % | |
| Labour | | | % | |
| Liberal | | | % | |
| Independent | | | % | |
| Majority | | | % | |
| Labour gain from Liberal | | Swing | | |
| Conservative hold | | Swing | | |

6 May 1982 Electorate Turnout %,
| Party | Candidate | Votes | % | ±% |
|---|---|---|---|---|
| Conservative | | | % | |
| Labour | | | % | |
| Liberal | | | % | |
| Independent | | | % | |
| Majority | | | % | |
| Labour gain from Liberal | | Swing | | |
| Conservative hold | | Swing | | |

7 May 1981 Electorate Turnout %,
| Party | Candidate | Votes | % | ±% |
|---|---|---|---|---|
| Conservative | | | % | |
| Labour | | | % | |
| Liberal | | | % | |
| Independent | | | % | |
| Majority | | | % | |
| Labour gain from Liberal | | Swing | | |
| Conservative hold | | Swing | | |

1 May 1980 Electorate Turnout %,
| Party | Candidate | Votes | % | ±% |
|---|---|---|---|---|
| Conservative | | | % | |
| Labour | | | % | |
| Liberal | | | % | |
| Independent | | | % | |
| Majority | | | % | |
| Labour gain from Liberal | | Swing | | |
| Conservative hold | | Swing | | |

=== 1970s ===
3 May 1979 Electorate Turnout %,
| Party | Candidate | Votes | % | ±% |
|---|---|---|---|---|
| Conservative | | | % | |
| Labour | | | % | |
| Liberal | | | % | |
| Independent | | | % | |
| Majority | | | % | |
| Labour gain from Liberal | | Swing | | |
| Conservative hold | | Swing | | |

4 May 1978 Electorate Turnout %,
| Party | Candidate | Votes | % | ±% |
|---|---|---|---|---|
| Conservative | | | % | |
| Labour | | | % | |
| Liberal | | | % | |
| Independent | | | % | |
| Majority | | | % | |
| Labour gain from Liberal | | Swing | | |
| Conservative hold | | Swing | | |

5 May 1977 Electorate Turnout %,
| Party | Candidate | Votes | % | ±% |
|---|---|---|---|---|
| Conservative | | | % | |
| Labour | | | % | |
| Liberal | | | % | |
| Independent | | | % | |
| Majority | | | % | |
| Labour gain from Liberal | | Swing | | |
| Conservative hold | | Swing | | |

6 May 1976 Electorate Turnout %,
| Party | Candidate | Votes | % | ±% |
|---|---|---|---|---|
| Conservative | | | % | |
| Labour | | | % | |
| Liberal | | | % | |
| Independent | | | % | |
| Majority | | | % | |
| Labour gain from Liberal | | Swing | | |
| Conservative hold | | Swing | | |

1 May 1975 Electorate Turnout %,
| Party | Candidate | Votes | % | ±% |
|---|---|---|---|---|
| Conservative | | | % | |
| Labour | | | % | |
| Liberal | | | % | |
| Independent | | | % | |
| Majority | | | % | |
| Labour gain from Liberal | | Swing | | |
| Conservative hold | | Swing | | |

2 May 1974 Electorate Turnout %,
| Party | Candidate | Votes | % | ±% |
|---|---|---|---|---|
| Conservative | | | % | |
| Labour | | | % | |
| Liberal | | | % | |
| Independent | | | % | |
| Majority | | | % | |
| Labour gain from Liberal | | Swing | | |
| Conservative hold | | Swing | | |

3 May 1973 Electorate Turnout %,
| Party | Candidate | Votes | % | ±% |
|---|---|---|---|---|
| Conservative | | | % | |
| Labour | | | % | |
| Liberal | | | % | |
| Independent | | | % | |
| Majority | | | % | |
| Labour gain from Liberal | | Swing | | |
| Conservative hold | | Swing | | |

4 May 1972 Electorate Turnout %,
| Party | Candidate | Votes | % | ±% |
|---|---|---|---|---|
| Conservative | | | % | |
| Labour | | | % | |
| Liberal | | | % | |
| Independent | | | % | |
| Majority | | | % | |
| Labour gain from Liberal | | Swing | | |
| Conservative hold | | Swing | | |

13 May 1971 Electorate Turnout %,
| Party | Candidate | Votes | % | ±% |
|---|---|---|---|---|
| Conservative | | | % | |
| Labour | | | % | |
| Liberal | | | % | |
| Independent | | | % | |
| Majority | | | % | |
| Labour gain from Liberal | | Swing | | |
| Conservative hold | | Swing | | |

7 May 1970 Electorate Turnout %,
| Party | Candidate | Votes | % | ±% |
|---|---|---|---|---|
| Conservative | | | % | |
| Labour | | | % | |
| Liberal | | | % | |
| Independent | | | % | |
| Majority | | | % | |
| Labour gain from Liberal | | Swing | | |
| Conservative hold | | Swing | | |

=== 1960s ===
8 May 1969 Electorate Turnout %,
| Party | Candidate | Votes | % | ±% |
|---|---|---|---|---|
| Conservative | | | % | |
| Labour | | | % | |
| Liberal | | | % | |
| Independent | | | % | |
| Majority | | | % | |
| Labour gain from Liberal | | Swing | | |
| Conservative hold | | Swing | | |

9 May 1968 Electorate Turnout %,
| Party | Candidate | Votes | % | ±% |
|---|---|---|---|---|
| Conservative | | | % | |
| Labour | | | % | |
| Liberal | | | % | |
| Independent | | | % | |
| Majority | | | % | |
| Labour gain from Liberal | | Swing | | |
| Conservative hold | | Swing | | |

11 May 1967 Electorate Turnout %,
| Party | Candidate | Votes | % | ±% |
|---|---|---|---|---|
| Conservative | | | % | |
| Labour | | | % | |
| Liberal | | | % | |
| Independent | | | % | |
| Majority | | | % | |
| Labour gain from Liberal | | Swing | | |
| Conservative hold | | Swing | | |

12 May 1966 Electorate Turnout %,
| Party | Candidate | Votes | % | ±% |
|---|---|---|---|---|
| Conservative | | | % | |
| Labour | | | % | |
| Liberal | | | % | |
| Independent | | | % | |
| Majority | | | % | |
| Labour gain from Liberal | | Swing | | |
| Conservative hold | | Swing | | |

13 May 1965 Electorate Turnout %,
| Party | Candidate | Votes | % | ±% |
|---|---|---|---|---|
| Conservative | | | % | |
| Labour | | | % | |
| Liberal | | | % | |
| Independent | | | % | |
| Majority | | | % | |
| Labour gain from Liberal | | Swing | | |
| Conservative hold | | Swing | | |

7 May 1964 Electorate Turnout %,
| Party | Candidate | Votes | % | ±% |
|---|---|---|---|---|
| Conservative | | | % | |
| Labour | | | % | |
| Liberal | | | % | |
| Independent | | | % | |
| Majority | | | % | |
| Labour gain from Liberal | | Swing | | |
| Conservative hold | | Swing | | |

9 May 1963 Electorate Turnout %,
| Party | Candidate | Votes | % | ±% |
|---|---|---|---|---|
| Conservative | | | % | |
| Labour | | | % | |
| Liberal | | | % | |
| Independent | | | % | |
| Majority | | | % | |
| Labour gain from Liberal | | Swing | | |
| Conservative hold | | Swing | | |

10 May 1962 Electorate Turnout %,
| Party | Candidate | Votes | % | ±% |
|---|---|---|---|---|
| Conservative | | | % | |
| Labour | | | % | |
| Liberal | | | % | |
| Independent | | | % | |
| Majority | | | % | |
| Labour gain from Liberal | | Swing | | |
| Conservative hold | | Swing | | |

11 May 1961 Electorate Turnout %,
| Party | Candidate | Votes | % | ±% |
|---|---|---|---|---|
| Conservative | | | % | |
| Labour | | | % | |
| Liberal | | | % | |
| Independent | | | % | |
| Majority | | | % | |
| Labour gain from Liberal | | Swing | | |
| Conservative hold | | Swing | | |

12 May 1960 Electorate Turnout %,
| Party | Candidate | Votes | % | ±% |
|---|---|---|---|---|
| Conservative | | | % | |
| Labour | | | % | |
| Liberal | | | % | |
| Independent | | | % | |
| Majority | | | % | |
| Labour gain from Liberal | | Swing | | |
| Conservative hold | | Swing | | |

=== 1950s ===
14 May 1959 Electorate Turnout %,
| Party | Candidate | Votes | % | ±% |
|---|---|---|---|---|
| Conservative | | | % | |
| Labour | | | % | |
| Liberal | | | % | |
| Independent | | | % | |
| Majority | | | % | |
| Labour gain from Liberal | | Swing | | |
| Conservative hold | | Swing | | |

8 May 1958 Electorate Turnout %,
| Party | Candidate | Votes | % | ±% |
|---|---|---|---|---|
| Conservative | | | % | |
| Labour | | | % | |
| Liberal | | | % | |
| Independent | | | % | |
| Majority | | | % | |
| Labour gain from Liberal | | Swing | | |
| Conservative hold | | Swing | | |

9 May 1957 Electorate Turnout %,
| Party | Candidate | Votes | % | ±% |
|---|---|---|---|---|
| Conservative | | | % | |
| Labour | | | % | |
| Liberal | | | % | |
| Independent | | | % | |
| Majority | | | % | |
| Labour gain from Liberal | | Swing | | |
| Conservative hold | | Swing | | |

10 May 1956 Electorate Turnout %,
| Party | Candidate | Votes | % | ±% |
|---|---|---|---|---|
| Conservative | | | % | |
| Labour | | | % | |
| Liberal | | | % | |
| Independent | | | % | |
| Majority | | | % | |
| Labour gain from Liberal | | Swing | | |
| Conservative hold | | Swing | | |

12 May 1955 Electorate Turnout %,
| Party | Candidate | Votes | % | ±% |
|---|---|---|---|---|
| Conservative | | | % | |
| Labour | | | % | |
| Liberal | | | % | |
| Independent | | | % | |
| Majority | | | % | |
| Labour gain from Liberal | | Swing | | |
| Conservative hold | | Swing | | |

13 May 1954 Electorate Turnout %,
| Party | Candidate | Votes | % | ±% |
|---|---|---|---|---|
| Conservative | | | % | |
| Labour | | | % | |
| Liberal | | | % | |
| Independent | | | % | |
| Majority | | | % | |
| Labour gain from Liberal | | Swing | | |
| Conservative hold | | Swing | | |

7 May 1953 Electorate Turnout %,
| Party | Candidate | Votes | % | ±% |
|---|---|---|---|---|
| Conservative | | | % | |
| Labour | | | % | |
| Liberal | | | % | |
| Independent | | | % | |
| Majority | | | % | |
| Labour gain from Liberal | | Swing | | |
| Conservative hold | | Swing | | |

8 May 1952 Electorate Turnout %,
| Party | Candidate | Votes | % | ±% |
|---|---|---|---|---|
| Conservative | | | % | |
| Labour | | | % | |
| Liberal | | | % | |
| Independent | | | % | |
| Majority | | | % | |
| Labour gain from Liberal | | Swing | | |
| Conservative hold | | Swing | | |

10 May 1951 Electorate Turnout %,
| Party | Candidate | Votes | % | ±% |
|---|---|---|---|---|
| Conservative | | | % | |
| Labour | | | % | |
| Liberal | | | % | |
| Independent | | | % | |
| Majority | | | % | |
| Labour gain from Liberal | | Swing | | |
| Conservative hold | | Swing | | |

11 May 1950 Electorate Turnout %,
| Party | Candidate | Votes | % | ±% |
|---|---|---|---|---|
| Conservative | | | % | |
| Labour | | | % | |
| Liberal | | | % | |
| Independent | | | % | |
| Majority | | | % | |
| Labour gain from Liberal | | Swing | | |
| Conservative hold | | Swing | | |

=== 1940s ===
12 May 1949 Electorate Turnout %,
| Party | Candidate | Votes | % | ±% |
|---|---|---|---|---|
| Conservative | | | % | |
| Labour | | | % | |
| Liberal | | | % | |
| Independent | | | % | |
| Majority | | | % | |
| Labour gain from Liberal | | Swing | | |
| Conservative hold | | Swing | | |

1 November 1947 Electorate Turnout %,
| Party | Candidate | Votes | % | ±% |
|---|---|---|---|---|
| Conservative | | | % | |
| Labour | | | % | |
| Liberal | | | % | |
| Independent | | | % | |
| Majority | | | % | |
| Labour gain from Liberal | | Swing | | |
| Conservative hold | | Swing | | |

2 November 1946 Electorate Turnout %,
| Party | Candidate | Votes | % | ±% |
|---|---|---|---|---|
| Conservative | | | % | |
| Labour | | | % | |
| Liberal | | | % | |
| Independent | | | % | |
| Majority | | | % | |
| Labour gain from Liberal | | Swing | | |
| Conservative hold | | Swing | | |

3 November 1945 Electorate Turnout %,
| Party | Candidate | Votes | % | ±% |
|---|---|---|---|---|
| Conservative | | | % | |
| Labour | | | % | |
| Liberal | | | % | |
| Independent | | | % | |
| Majority | | | % | |
| Labour gain from Liberal | | Swing | | |
| Conservative hold | | Swing | | |
