= T in the Park 2007 =

Music festival in Scotland

- Genre: Various
- Dates: 6 – 8 July 2007
- Locations: Balado, Perth and Kinross, Scotland
- Website: http://www.tinthepark.com

The 2007 T in the Park festival took place on 6, 7 and 8 July 2007. The event was the first time the festival had been held over three days. The new Friday evening which included Lily Allen, Arctic Monkeys and The Coral was only available to 50,000 people who purchased weekend and camping tickets which gave access to the festival arena.

== Tickets ==
The first 35,000 tickets went on sale shortly after the 2006 festival and were sold within 70 minutes. The final batch of 40,000 tickets, were released on 9 March and sold out in less than 20 minutes.

== Event ==
The first day was marred by traffic congestion with up to 13 hours of delays and 12 miles of tailbacks on the southbound M90 motorway, which was the knock on effect of Heavy rain causing the main car parks to flood and eventually led to their complete closure. The Scots term ye shouldnae even a came became well known at the 2007 festival; as several security staff directed the comment at "revellers" who complained about the appalling traffic.

A month later the police apologised for traffic chaos at T in the Park. Tayside chief constable John Vine revealed over 20 letters had been sent out in response to complaints, as the event was heavily criticised by locals. In a report to his police board, Vine said the force were carrying out a full review of operations at the festival. He said: "Discussions have taken place with organisers. There will also be a fundamental review of contingency plans and, in particular, traffic management."

The number of arrest was down from the previous years 70 to 64, with 30 people taken into custody. 617 people were treated at the hospital tent which was slightly higher than the previous years figure. 53 patients were transferred to NHS hospitals off site which is well below the norm for the event. 400 tonnes of rubbish was removed in 2006 and this year the waste has been reduced to 350 tonnes with 40% of that being recycled.

== Line up ==
Amy Winehouse and Gogol Bordello pulled out at the last minute due to "exhaustion" and to duet with Madonna at Live Earth, respectively. Tokyo Police Club failed to turn up for unknown reasons, as did You Say Party! We Say Die! and New Creations.

"We agreed that it was the highlight of our career so far," said Brandon Flowers of The Killers' headline set. "The crowd were amazing. We felt we could do no wrong. That was the first time I ever thought, 'Wow, this is what it's like being in U2!'"

The 2007 line-up was as follows:

=== Main Stage ===
| Friday 6 July | Saturday 7 July | Sunday 8 July |
| Arctic Monkeys; Bloc Party; The Coral; Lily Allen | The Killers; Razorlight; Arcade Fire; James; Lostprophets; James Morrison; The Skids; The Saw Doctors | Snow Patrol; Scissor Sisters; Kings of Leon; The Fratellis; Paolo Nutini; Goo Goo Dolls; Avril Lavigne; The Cribs |

=== Radio 1/NME Stage ===
| Saturday 7 July | Sunday 8 July |
| The Kooks; My Chemical Romance; Babyshambles; CSS; Little Man Tate; Dogs; Blood Red Shoes | Kasabian; Interpol; Maxïmo Park; Biffy Clyro; Mika; The Gossip; The Twang; The Pigeon Detectives; You Say Party! We Say Die!; We Are The Physics |

=== King Tut's Tent ===
| Friday 6 July | Saturday 7 July | Sunday 8 July |
| Club Noir Burlesque Club; Steve Tilley (DJ); Craig Fisher (DJ); Horrorshow DJs | The View; Klaxons; Jamie T; Black Rebel Motorcycle Club; The Long Blondes; Calvin Harris; Camera Obscura; Ross Copperman; The Cinematics | Queens of the Stone Age; Editors; Jet; Ocean Colour Scene; Enter Shikari; Just Jack; The Bravery; The Maccabees; Union of Knives; The Hedrons |

=== Pet Sounds Arena ===
| Saturday 7 July | Sunday 8 July |
| Brian Wilson; Rufus Wainwright; Bright Eyes; Cold War Kids; Sinéad O'Connor; Albert Hammond Jr.; Sierra Leone's Refugee All Stars; Mr Hudson and the Library; Charlotte Hatherley | Damien Rice; Air; Tori Amos; Badly Drawn Boy; The Brian Jonestown Massacre; The Dykeenies; The Hold Steady; Malcolm Middleton |

=== Slam Tent ===
| Saturday 7 July | Sunday 8 July |
| DJ Shadow vs Cut Chemist; Dizzee Rascal (live); Âme; Hot Chip; Miss Kittin; Steve Bug; Adam Beyer; Soundstream/Soundhack; Green Velvet (live); Alloy Mental | Wu-Tang Clan (live); Dave Clarke; Slam; Hardfloor; Digitalism; Felix Da Housecat; Tiga; Josh Wink; Booka Shade (live); Andrew Weatherall |

=== Futures Stage ===
| Saturday 7 July | Sunday 8 July |
| The Enemy; New Young Pony Club; The Sounds; The Hours; Air Traffic; Reverend & The Makers; Ghosts; Kate Nash; Remi Nicole; Lost Alone; Unklejam | The Sunshine Underground; The Holloways; The Pipettes; The Horrors; Plan B; Shiny Toy Guns; The Rumble Strips; Switches; Jack Peñate; Tokyo Police Club |

=== T-break Stage ===
| Friday 6 July | Saturday 7 July | Sunday 8 July |
| San Sebastian; Kobai; The Ads; Flood of Red; The Draymin; The Cider Spiders; Edgar Prais | Dance Lazarus Dance; V-2 Schneider; Down the Tiny Steps; Amy Macdonald; The Haze; Cry Over Billionaires; Attic Lights; Drive by argument; Sergeant; The New York Fund; The Moth and The Mirror; Chutes; Popup | Theatre Fall; Yashin; The Little Kicks; M.O.T; Colin MacIntyre; The Law; Make Model; Bricolage; The Vivians; The Touches; New Creations; The Lynes; Over The Wall; Figure 5 |

== links ==
- http://www.list.co.uk/article/2376-t-in-the-park-2007-running-times/
- http://www.virtualfestivals.com/t-in-the-park-2007/news
