= Neon Twang =

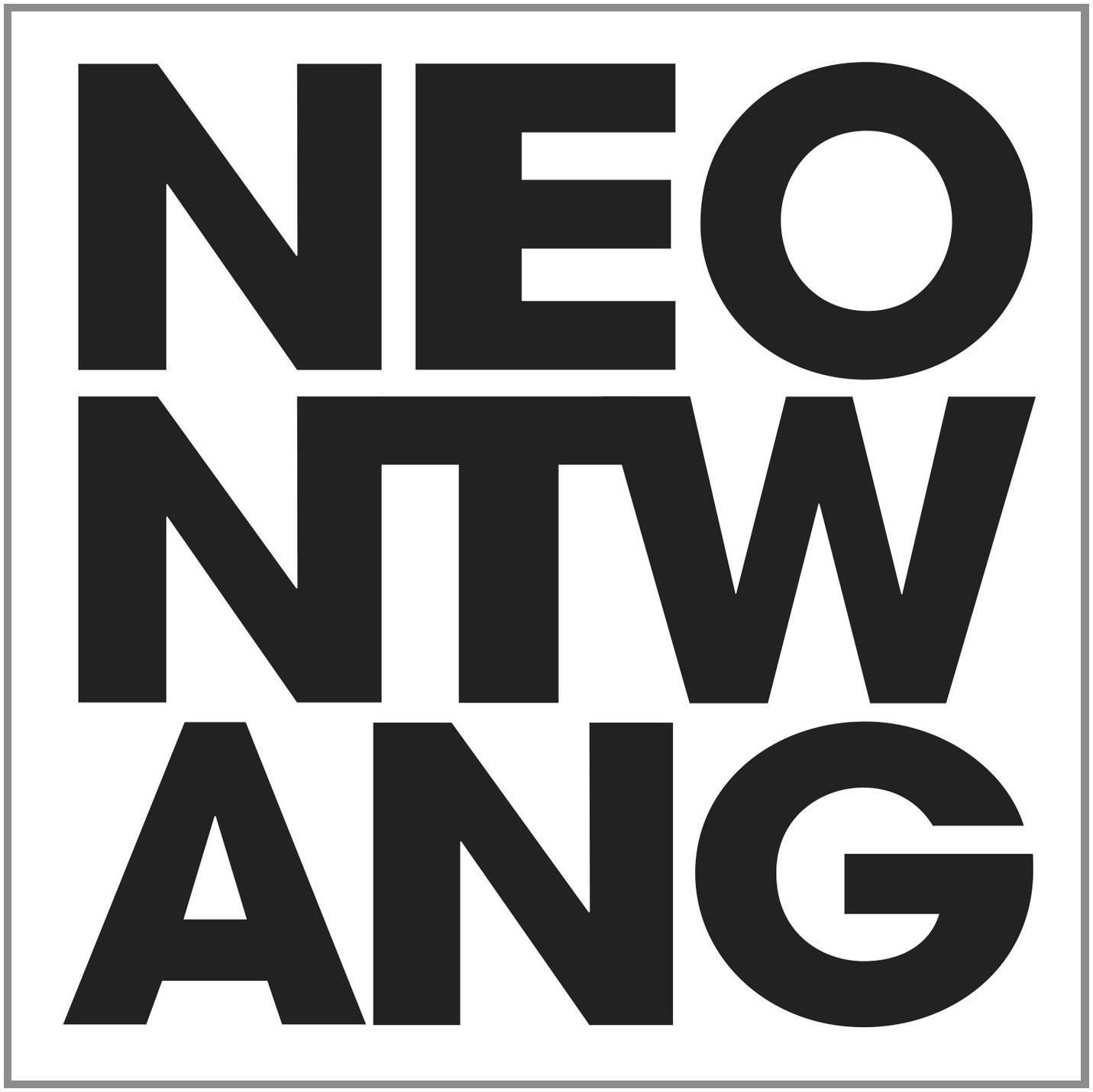

Studio album by the Twang
- Released: 10 March 2014
- Studio: Lightship95 in Poplar, London
- Genre: Indie rock
- Length: 42:42
- Producers: Rory Attwell; The Twang

The Twang chronology
| 10:20 (2012) | Neon Twang (2014) | If Confronted Just Go Mad (2019) |

Professional ratings
Aggregate scores
| Source | Rating |
|---|---|
| Metacritic | 32/100 |
Review scores
| Source | Rating |
| NME | link |
| Q | 1/5 stars |

Neon Twang (stylised as NEONTWANG) is the fourth album by British indie rock band the Twang, released in 2014.

== Track listing ==
Music and words by the Twang.

| No. | Title | Length |
|---|---|---|
| 1. | "City Lights" | 4:33 |
| 2. | "Larry Lizard" | 3:37 |
| 3. | "New Love" | 3:57 |
| 4. | "The Wobble" | 4:16 |
| 5. | "Sucker for the Sun" | 3:20 |
| 6. | "Almost Anything" | 3:27 |
| 7. | "Happy Families" | 3:17 |
| 8. | "Medicine" | 4:53 |
| 9. | "Bigger Than You" | 4:13 |
| 10. | "Step Away" | 3:42 |
| 11. | "Bywyd Da" | 3:27 |
| Total length: | | 42:42 |

== Personnel ==
- Phil Etheridge – vocals
- Martin Saunders – vocals
- Jon Watkin – guitar
- Jon Simcox – guitar, programming
- Ash Sheehan – drums
- Rory Attwell – producer, recording, mixing, backing vocals (track 2), drums (tracks 2, 8), guitar (track 6), piano (track 7)
- Jeremy Cooper – mastering
- Andy Hughes – photography
- Charlotte Kelly – sleeve
