= Moseley Folk and Arts Festival =

UK music and arts festival

- Nickname: MoFo, MoFolk
- Status: active
- Genre: Folk music, Independent
- Frequency: Annually, first Friday of September
- Locations: Moseley Park, Moseley, Birmingham
- Coordinates: 52°26′54″N 01°53′31″W
- Years active: 2006-present
- Website: moseleyfolk.co.uk

Moseley Folk and Arts Festival is an independent music festival which takes place annually in Birmingham.

First held in 2006 as a two-day event (as Moseley Folk Festival), it later expanded to three days.

The festival's core programming is a "mix of traditional, contemporary and experimental folk and acoustic music”, along with other genres, such as folk-rock and indie while its Arts strand spans comedy, spoken word and family-friendly activities.

The festival utilises Moseley Park's "natural amphitheatre" with its Main Stage set in front of a small lake.

== History ==
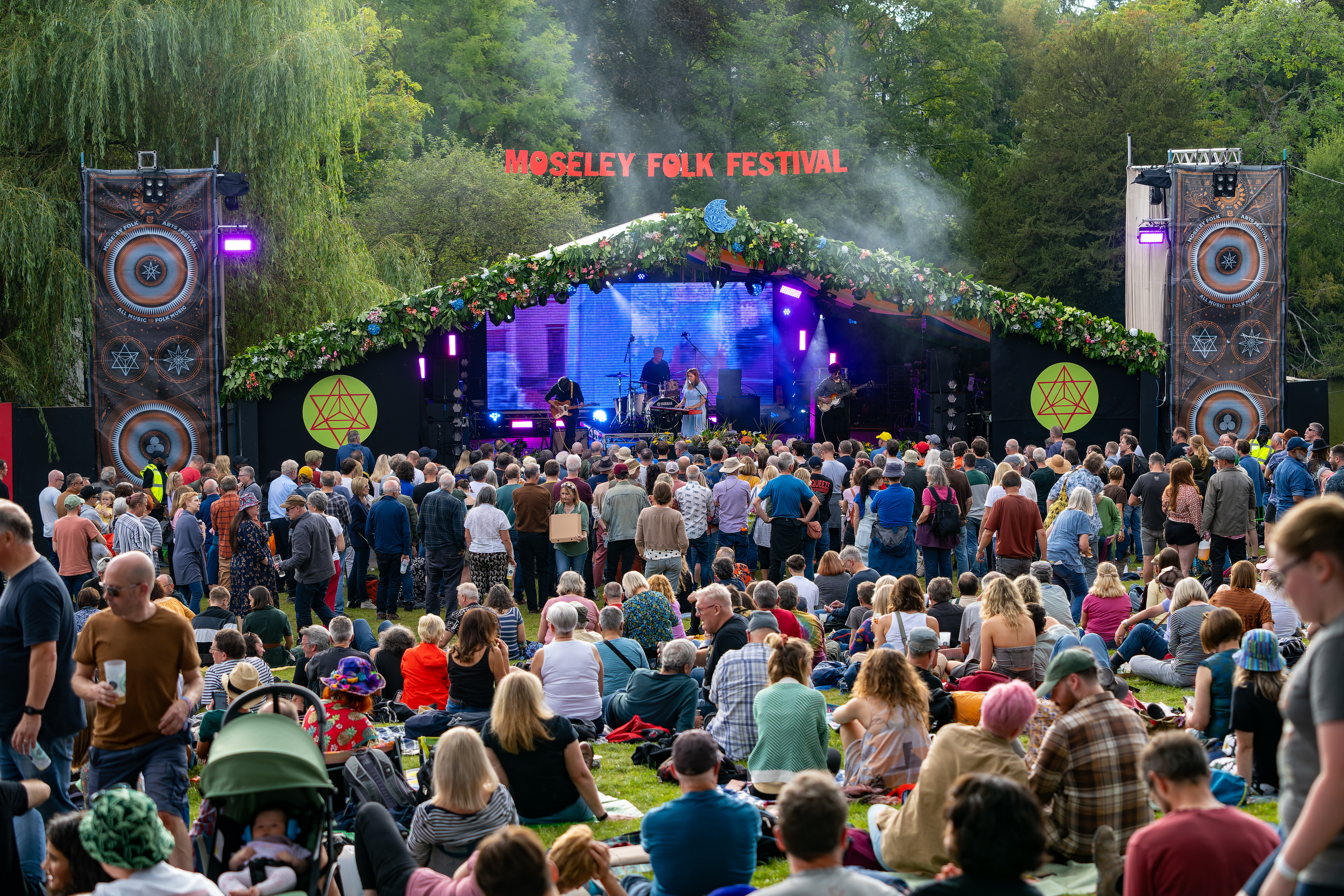
Moseley Folk and Arts Festival 2023, with Gwenno performing on the Main Stage

The first Moseley Folk Festival took place in 2006 in Moseley Park, in the suburb of Moseley, Birmingham. The site that had previously hosted outdoor gypsy jazz event, L'Esprit Manouche.

Running over two days (Saturday 3 and Sunday 4 September 2006), the inaugural line-up featured a mix of folk, and folk-adjacent, artists including The Incredible String Band (with their 'final gig'), Seth Lakeman, Jacqui McShee's Pentangle, Tunng, Hayseed Dixie, John Renbourn and Nick Harper, plus a number of artists from Birmingham and the West Midlands (e.g. Scott Matthews, Steve Gibbons, The Destroyers etc.).

The festival was deemed a success, with more than one thousand attending. As a result, a second two-day event returned the following year, with over 40 acts appearing across three stages - amongst them Fairport Convention, Kate Rusby, Nizlopi, Rory McLeod and John Power. The festival also included an international knitting convention and a live carrom championship.

By the third edition, Moseley Folk Festival had expanded to three days (Friday 29 to Sunday 31 August 2008), with headliners Morcheeba, José González, The Bees, Seth Lakeman, Scott Matthews, Waterson:Carthy and Rachel Unthank & The Winterset (aka The Unthanks).

On the Saturday, veteran Birmingham folk musician Ian Campbell was joined on stage by son Duncan Campbell of UB40 for his final live performance, with organisers stating the event had been the most successful to date, with then capacity crowds of 2,000 per day.

There have been further notable appearances in the festival's history. These include The Polyphonic Spree joining The Monkees on stage for a rendition of "The Porpoise Song (Theme From Head)" in 2015, and 2019's festival, when US singer-songwriter Don McLean was introduced by near-namesake, Birmingham comedian Don Maclean. In 2023, headliners Wilco's encore saw the band unexpectedly reunite with Billy Bragg for "California Stars", and in 2014, Johnny Marr was joined on stage by Billy Duffy of The Cult for "I Fought The Law" and The Smiths' "How Soon Is Now?".

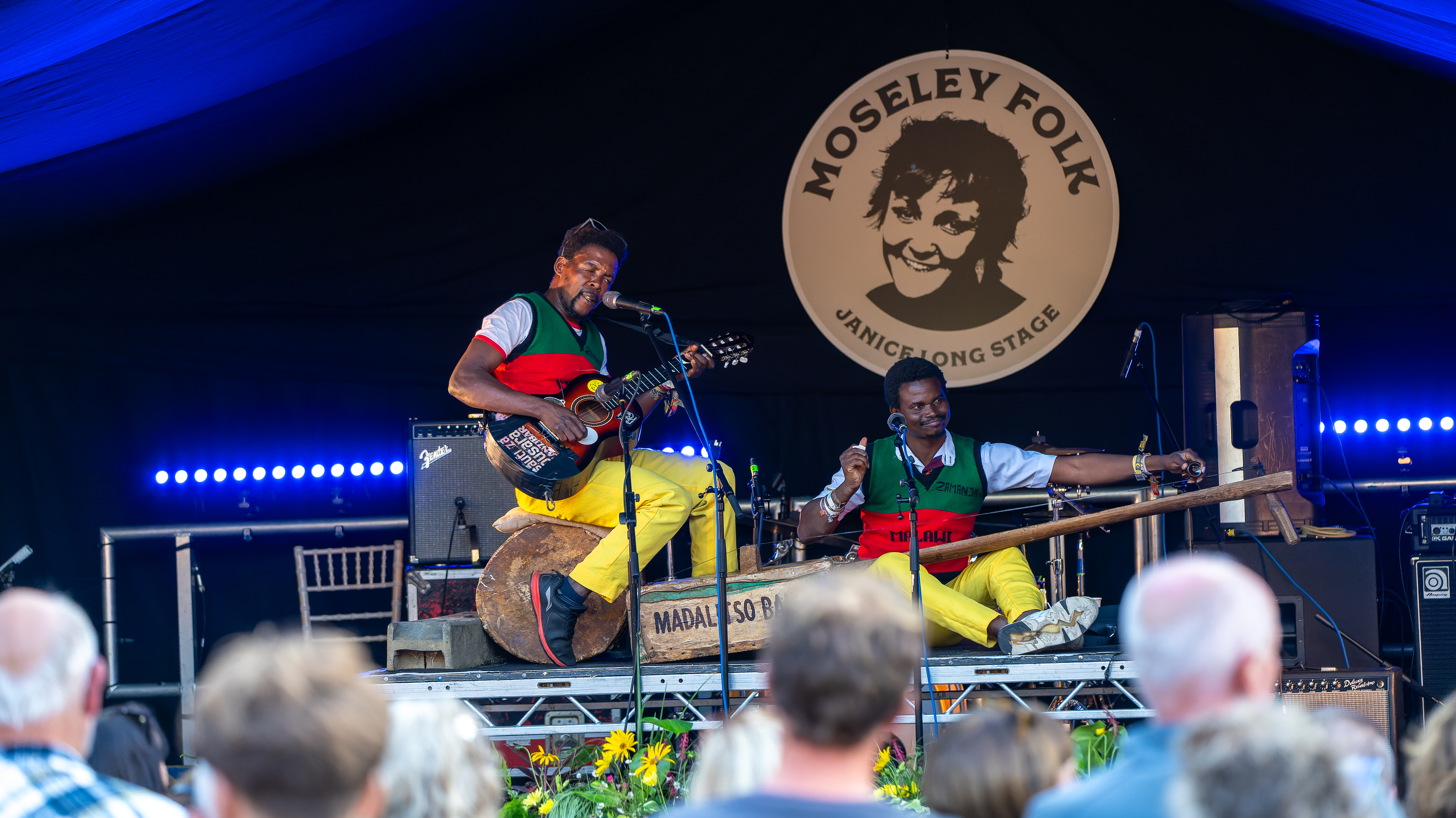
Moseley Folk and Arts Festival 2023, with Madalitso Band performing on the Janice Long Stage, named in honour of the festival's former MC, Janice Long

In 2022, the festival paid tribute to longstanding festival compere Janice Long with the launch of a bursary; Janice had been a supporter of the event from the outset, acting as MC at the first event. The festival's Second Stage was also renamed The Janice Long Stage in her honour.

Reflecting the expansion of the festival's programming to include comedy, spoken word and talks, the festival changed its name from Moseley Folk Festival to Moseley Folk and Arts Festival in 2019. Notable non-music guests who have appeared at the festival have included comedian Joe Lycett, artist/satirist Cold War Steve, poet John Cooper Clarke and historian Carl Chinn.

Over the years, the festival has partnered with numerous regional arts organisations, with Birmingham Comedy Festival hosting stand-up comedy appearances and the Black Country Living Museum offering drop-in workshops. Birmingham Folk and Kitchen Garden Cafe have also previously partnered with the festival.

Although categorised as a boutique or smaller festival, Moseley Folk's capacity has increased with 6,000 attendees per day reported in 2018.

2020's festival line-up was announced prior to being postponed due to pandemic restrictions. However, many of the acts were rebooked for the following year.

As a result of the lost year, Moseley Folk marked their 20th anniversary edition with the 2026 festival.

== Awards ==
Moseley Folk and Arts Festival picked up Silver for Tourism Event/Festival of the Year in the West Midlands Tourism Awards 2024. The same year, the festival was also long-listed for Best Small Festival, Best Metropolitan Festival and Best Family Festival in the UK Festival Awards.

The annual event won Best Midlands Music Festival and was Runner up in the Best Family-Friendly/ Community Festival category in the What's On Readers' Awards 2016.

== Headliners ==
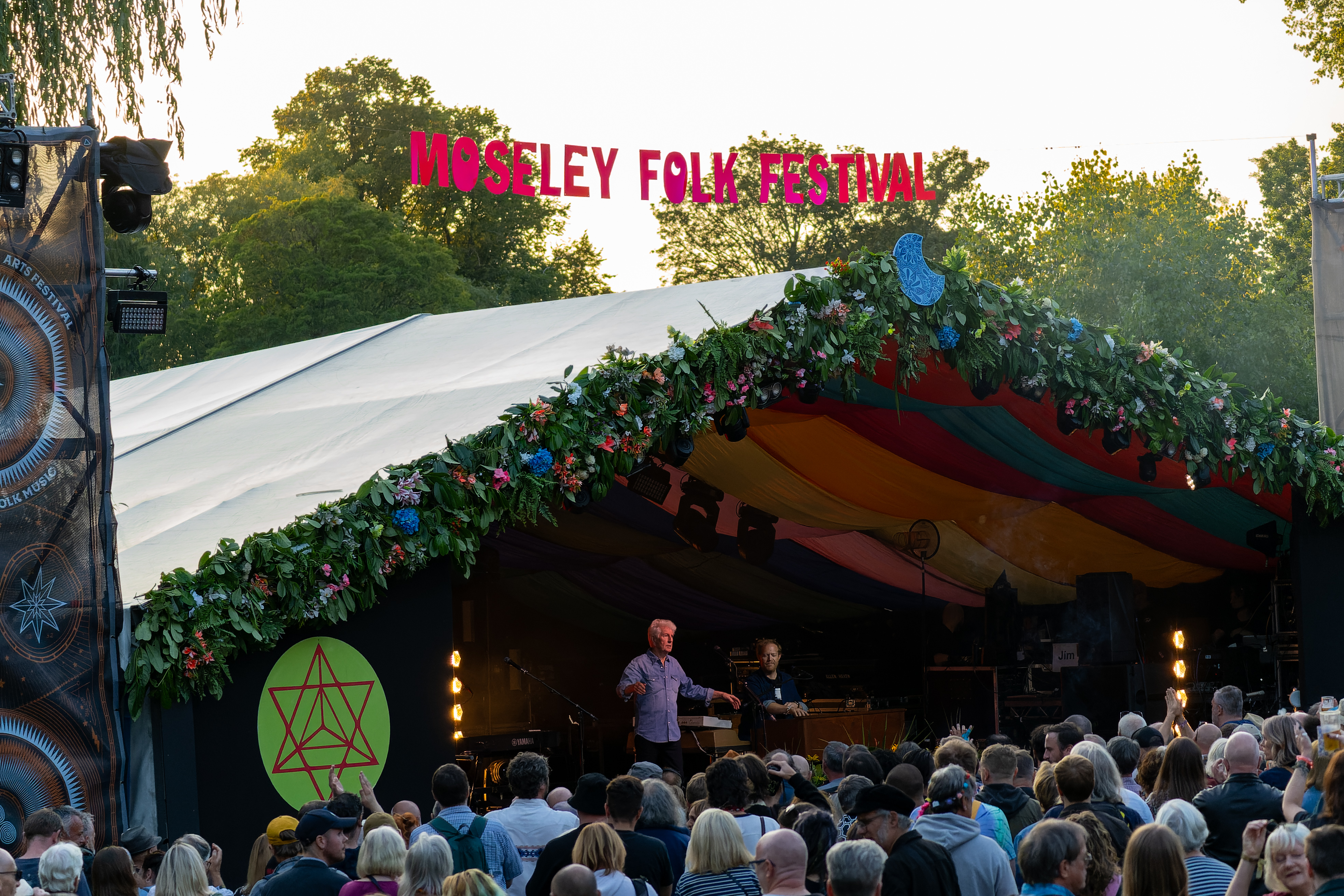
Graham Nash performing on the Moseley Folk Festival's Main Stage in 2023

Moseley Folk and Arts Festival has run annually since 2006, with the exception of 2020, when the festival was postponed due to COVID restrictions. Headliners and key artists include:

- 2006 – Hayseed Dixie, The Incredible String Band, Jacqui McShee's Pentange, Seth Lakeman
- 2007 - Fairport Convention, Kate Rusby, Davey Graham, Tunng
- 2008 - Morcheeba, Jose Gonzalez, The Bees, Seth Lakeman
- 2009 - Saint Etienne, Beth Orton, Jethro Tull, Cara Dillon, Bert Jansch
- 2010 - Donovan, Ukulele Orchestra of Great Britain, Divine Comedy, Turin Brakes
- 2011 - Tinariwen, Badly Drawn Boy, Billy Bragg, Gruff Rhys, Villagers
- 2012 - Echo and the Bunnymen, Roy Harper, Steeleye Span, Guillemots
- 2013 - The Dublin Legends, Ocean Colour Scene, British Sea Power, Kate Rusby
- 2014 - Johnny Marr, The Waterboys, Richard Thompson, Thurston Moore, Lau, Jimi Goodwin
- 2015 - The Monkees, Spiritualized, Anna Calvi, Blossoms, Idlewild, Gaz Coombes
- 2016 - Levellers, The Coral, The Proclaimers, The Jayhawks, Billy Bragg, Oysterband
- 2017 - Laura Marling, Amy Macdonald, Jose Gonzalez, Seth Lakeman, Fairport Convention, Kate Rusby
- 2018 - Levellers, Nick Mulvey, Teenage Fanclub, Show of Hands, This Is the Kit, Steve Harley and Cockney Rebel
- 2019 - Don McLean, Jake Bugg, Public Service Broadcasting, The Zutons, Richard Thompson, Edwyn Collins
- 2020 - Postponed
- 2021 - The Waterboys, Frank Turner, Richard Hawley, Gruff Rhys, The Wonder Stuff
- 2022 - Supergrass, Seasick Steve, Jethro Tull, The Coral, Kurt Vile and The Violators, Midlake
- 2023 - Wilco, Billy Bragg (replacing The Proclaimers), Squeeze, Graham Nash
- 2024 - Belle and Sebastian, Levellers, Dexys, Flogging Molly, CMAT
- 2025 - Father John Misty, The Waterboys, Doves, The Lightning Seeds, Peter Doherty
- 2026 - (Scheduled) Super Furry Animals, The Dead South, Kingfishr, Frank Turner, The Wonder Stuff
