= Jewellery Quarter (album) =

Studio album by the Twang
- Released: 3 August 2009
- Recorded: 2008–2009
- Genre: Indie rock
- Length: 44:06
- Label: B-Unique Records

The Twang chronology
Love It When I Feel Like This (2007)	Jewellery Quarter (2009)	10:20 (2012)

Singles from Jewellery Quarter
- 1. "Barney Rubble" Released: 27 July 2009; 2. "Encouraging Sign" Released: 18 October 2009 (download only)

Professional ratings
Aggregate scores
Source	Rating
Metacritic	42/100
Review scores
Source	Rating
AllMusic	3.5/5 stars
Drowned in Sound	2/10
The Guardian	2/5 stars
Mojo	2/5 stars
MusicOMH	2/5 stars
NME	3/10
The Skinny	2/5 stars
Uncut	6/10

Jewellery Quarter is the second album by the Twang, released on 3 August 2009. The title was announced on 7 May, along with a free download of the final track on the album (CD version), namely "Another Bus". The album's first single was later announced as "Barney Rubble".

The album features a bonus disc of six tracks, including an acoustic version of the album's first single, "Barney Rubble".

On 13 July 2009, the band released the opening track, "Took The Fun", from the album on their MySpace page, and announced that there would be more songs put up each Monday until the release of the album. A week later, they put up "Twit Twoo". The whole album was streamed early on We7. The latest single to be released was "Encouraging Sign".

== Track listing ==
CD 1

1. "Took the Fun" – 3:47
2. "Barney Rubble" – 3:32
3. "Twit Twoo" – 3:00
4. "Put It On the Dancefloor" – 3:12
5. "May I Suggest" – 3:40
6. "Encouraging Sign" – 3:55
7. "Got No Interest" – 3:40
8. "Back Where We Started" – 3:27
9. "Answer My Call" – 4:29
10. "Live the Life" – 3:32
11. "Williamsburg" – 3:21
12. "Another Bus" – 4:31
13. "Every Part (iTunes bonus track)" - 3:23

CD 2

1. "Rainy Morning"
2. "Elusive Soul"
3. "Anglesey"
4. "Changing Me"
5. "Twit to Waltz"
6. "Barney Rubble (acoustic)"
