= Love It When I Feel Like This =

Studio album by the Twang
- Released: 4 June 2007
- Recorded: 2006–2007; The Magic Garden Studio, Wolverhampton
- Genre: Indie rock
- Length: 43:27
- Label: B-Unique Records
- Producer: Gavin Monaghan

The Twang chronology
Love It When I Feel Like This (2007)	Jewellery Quarter (2009)

Professional ratings
Review scores
Source	Rating
The Guardian	link
MusicOMH	link
NME	link
Stylus Magazine	(D−) link
The Times	link
Uncut	link

Love It When I Feel Like This is the debut album by Birmingham-based indie band the Twang, which was released in the United Kingdom on 4 June 2007 through B-Unique Records. The album was produced by the band's long-term collaborator Gavin Monaghan at The Magic Garden Studio, Wolverhampton, and was assisted by Gazz Rogers. It contains the band's first two singles, "Wide Awake" and "Either Way", plus nine brand new tracks.

In a January 2008 interview on Planet Sound, Phil Etheridge said that the record label was expecting the album to sell more, due to the hype the band received before album release. However, Etheridge in the same interview, expressed his pride in "having a gold disc on my wall". The album has since reached platinum certification.

Nearly two years after its initial release, the album was released in the U.S. on 14 April 2009 via Arena Rock Records

== Track listing ==
All tracks written by Phil Etheridge & Jon Watkin except track 5 written by Phil Etheridge, Jon Watkin, Hurby Azor & Ray Davies:

1. "Ice Cream Sundae" – 3:46
2. "Wide Awake" – 4:48
3. "The Neighbour" – 3:14
4. "Either Way" – 4:02
5. "Push the Ghosts" – 4:11
6. "Reap What You Sow" – 4:19
7. "Loosely Dancing" – 3:12
8. "Two Lovers" – 3:28
9. "Don't Wait Up" – 3:16
10. "Got Me Sussed" – 3:54
11. "Cloudy Room" – 5:05

== Singles ==
Information
"Wide Awake"
- Released: 19 March 2007
- Chart positions: #15 (UK Singles Chart)
"Either Way"
- Released: 28 May 2007
- Chart positions: #8 (UK Singles Chart)
"Two Lovers"
- Released: 27 August 2007
- Chart positions: #34 (UK Singles Chart)
"Push the Ghosts" / "Drinking In L.A"
- Released: 26 November 2007
- Chart positions: #63 (UK Singles Chart)

== Certifications ==
Region	Certification	Certified units/sales
United Kingdom (BPI)	Gold	100,000^{^}
^{^} Shipments figures based on certification alone.
