= 10:20 (The Twang album) =

Studio album by the Twang
- Released: 29 October 2012
- Genre: Indie rock
- Length: 41:26
- Label: Jump The Cut
- Producers: Jon Simcox, The Twang

The Twang chronology
Jewellery Quarter (2009)	10:20 (2012)	Neon Twang (2014)

Professional ratings
Review scores
Source	Rating
AllMusic	3/5 stars
NME	7/10 stars

10:20 is the third album by British indie rock band the Twang, released on 29 October 2012.

== Track listing ==
Words by Watkin, Saunders, Etheridge. Except track 9 (written by Vini Reilly). Music by the Twang.

No.	Title	Length
1.	"Neptune"	0:43
2.	"Mainline"	4:06
3.	"We're a Crowd"	3:44
4.	"Take This On"	3:44
5.	"Last Laugh"	4:07
6.	"Beer, Wine & Sunshine"	3:27
7.	"Paradise"	4:05
8.	"Whoa Man"	2:27
9.	"Tomorrow"	4:04
10.	"It Ain't Υou"	3:04
11.	"Guapa"	3:32
12.	"Strangers"	4:23
Total length:		41:26

== Personnel ==
- Phil Etheridge - vocals, bass, photography (cover)
- Jon Watkin - guitar
- Martin Saunders - vocals
- Jon Simcox - guitar, programming, producer, engineer
- Stu Hartland - guitar (tracks 1, 7)
- Ash Sheehan - trumpet (track 2)
- Rebecca Wilson - additional vocals (track 2)
- Neil Claxton - mixing
- Duncan Mills - mixing (track 2)
- Philip J Harvey - mixing (track 6)
- Andy Hawkins - additional mixing (track 3)
- Charlotte Kelly – sleeve
- Miami Stu – art direction
- Sam Gooding - photography
- John Dawkins - management
