= Either Way (The Twang song) =

2007 single by the Twang

Single by the Twang

from the album Love It When I Feel Like This
- B-side: "Lost My Smile"; "Wake Up"; "Your Beats"
- Released: 28 May 2007
- Length: 4:06
- Label: B-Unique
- Songwriter(s): Phil Etheridge; Jon Watkin; Stu Hartland; Matty Clinton; Martin Saunders
- Producer(s): Gavin Monaghan

The Twang singles chronology
"Wide Awake" (2007)	"Either Way" (2007)	"Two Lovers" (2007)

"Either Way" is a song by English rock band the Twang, released on 28 May 2007 as the second single from the band's debut album Love It When I Feel Like This. By downloads alone, "Either Way" initially entered at No. 33 on the UK Singles Chart and moved up to a peak position of No. 8 the following week due to sales of the physical release. It stayed on the chart for a total of seven weeks.

A remix of the song by the Streets was released, featuring rapper Professor Green. ShortList included the remix in their list of "The 10 best Mike Skinner remixes, B-sides, and rarities", saying: "Skinner and Professor Green featured on a remix of their (actually quite good (or at least not-that-bad)) track ‘Either Way’ and turned it into an absolute belter."

== Track listings ==
UK CD single

1. "Either Way" – 4:06
2. "Lost My Smile" – 3:23

UK 7-inch single 1

A. "Either Way" – 4:06
B. "Wake Up" – 3:26

UK 7-inch single 2

1. "Either Way" – 4:06
2. "Your Beats" – 3:47

== Charts ==
Chart (2007)	Peak position
European Hot 100 Singles (Billboard)	27
Scotland (OCC)	6
UK Singles (OCC)	8
