= Moseley Park =

Recreational park in United Kingdom

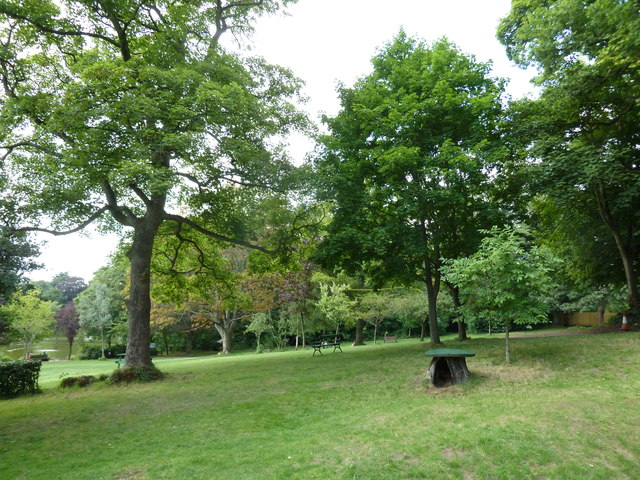
- View of the park in summer, with the pond in the background
- Interactive map of Moseley Park
- Location: Moseley
- Nearest city: Birmingham
- Coordinates: 52°26′54″N 01°53′31″W
- Area: 11-acre (4.5 ha)
- Created: 1899
- Operator: Moseley Trust

Moseley Park and Pool is an 11-acre (4.5 ha) gated park in Moseley, Birmingham, maintained by the Moseley Park and Pool Trust. It is located to the west of the district centre and the A435 Alcester Road; it sits in the Birmingham City Council electoral ward of Moseley and is situated very close to the border with Balsall Heath West .

The Park and Pool is open for all the local community on several days each month, usually between 10am and 4pm: including every Wednesday, for certain celebration days such as Bank Holidays, and on the last Saturday of each month (to coincide with the local Farmers' Market Day). Outside these hours, people need to sign up to buy an annual subscription to get their own key fob to open the gates (but there is no requirement to live nearby to do so).

The park also hosts over 80 local charities, schools, nurseries and community organisations bringing small groups to visit through its charitable Community Access Scheme.

== History ==
The park and pool were originally part of the gardens of Moseley Hall, which were designed by the estate landscape gardener Humphry Repton. Towards the end of the 19th century most of the estate was being sold for house building; in particular, the construction of Salisbury Road in 1896 disconnected the park from the Hall.

Businessmen bought the park and pool in order to prevent further development and preserve them for the citizens of Birmingham. The park was opened by local East Worcestershire MP Austen Chamberlain on 29 September 1899.

In 1983, the park became part of the wider Moseley Conservation area. This seeks to preserve the historic character of the locality. In particular, the centre of the park contains a number of specimen trees.

== Amenities and events ==
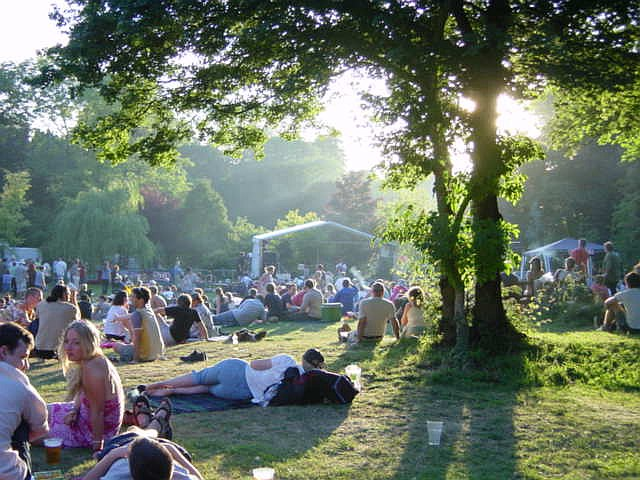
A music festival in the park

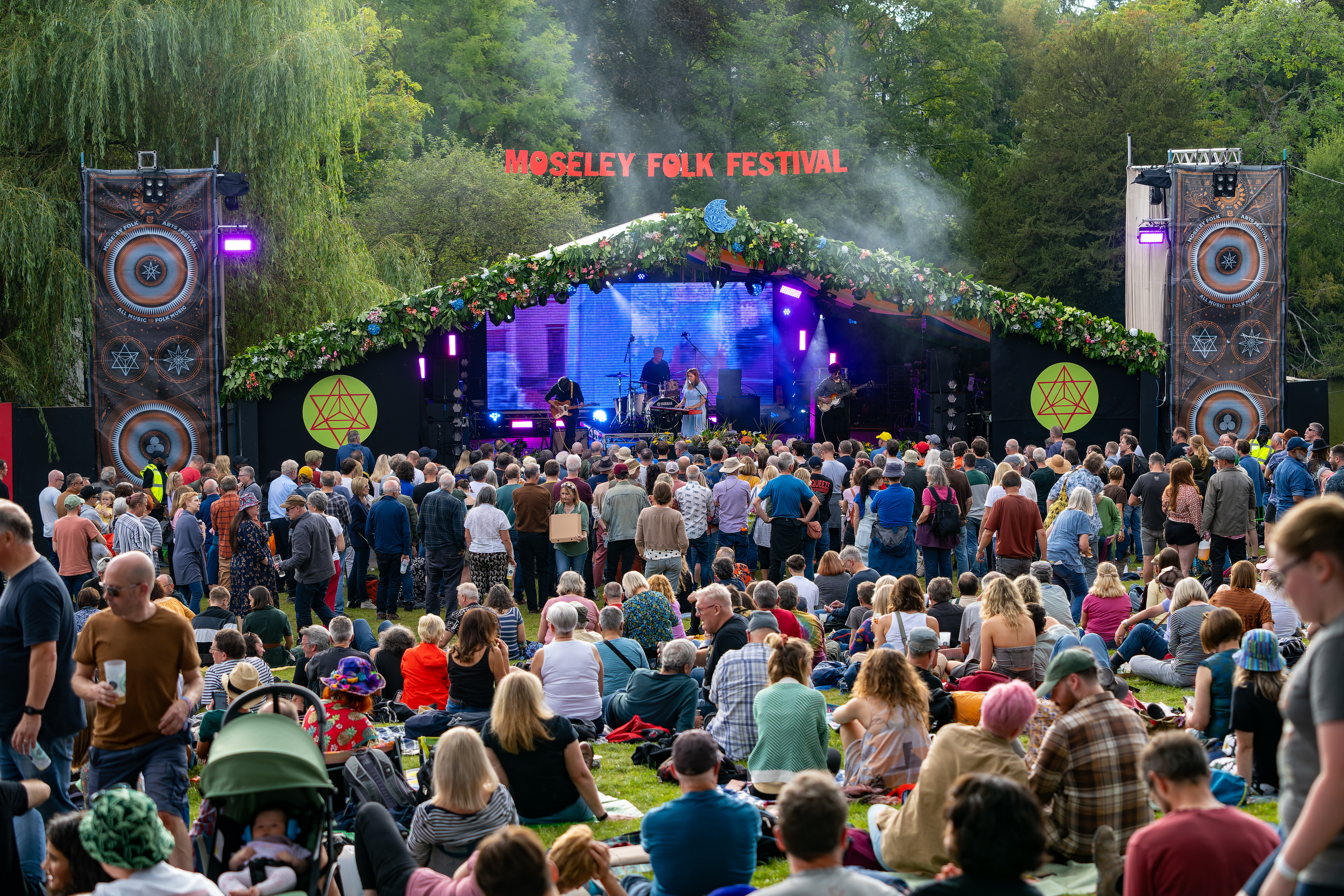
Moseley Folk Festival, 2023

The park is home to tennis, angling and yoga clubs, and hosts annual music festivals, including the Moseley Folk and Arts Festival, and Mostly Jazz. Ocean Colour Scene, who originate from the area, headlined a festival at the park in 2016 to celebrate the 20th anniversary of their album Moseley Shoals.

The Park and Pool also hosts a programme of outdoor community events, including family-friendly nature activities and arts and crafts workshops for adults and children: most of which are offered on a 'pay what you feel' basis.

An ice house in the park is Grade II listed. It was built in the 18th century and is around 16 feet (4.9 m) by 12 feet (3.7 m). The ice house was used for cold storage and storing ice before the invention of the refrigerator. It is believed to have storage space for up to 20 tonnes of ice and food materials were placed above it to be used as frozen food. It is now open for public viewing on Farmers' Market Days in the warmer months of the year.

In 2015, the Sunday Times named the park as one of the desirable factors for Moseley being the best place to live in the UK, beating London’s Mayfair and Muswell Hill.

The Park and Pool has a toilet block situated just inside the main Alcester Rd entrance, which has one standard cubicle, one ambulant cubicle, and one accessible cubicle (with work ongoing to entry pathway currently creating a barrier for some people).

== Security ==
A key is required to gain entry outside of Community Opening Hours. The former head ranger said it has made the park popular as people feel safe inside it. An incident where a man was spotted armed with a knife in the park surprised the former head ranger, who said that she had not heard of such a case in her 15 years of managing the site.

== See also ==
- Cannon Hill Park
