= 2011 Birmingham City Council election =

2011 UK local government election

- May 2011

One third (40) seats to Birmingham City Council 61 seats needed for a majority

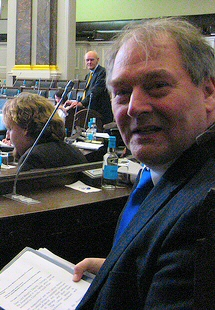

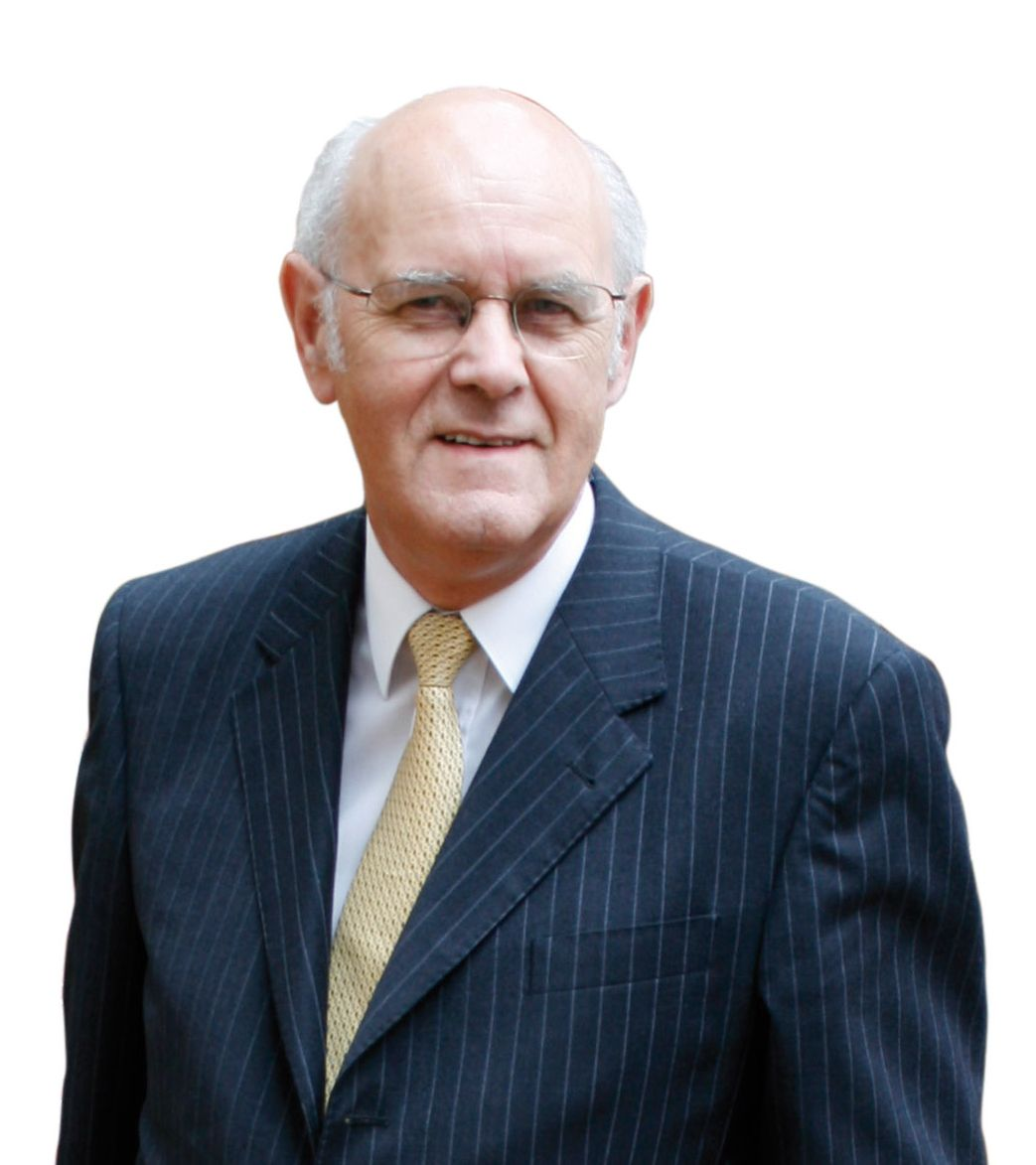
	First party	Second party	Third party
Leader	Albert Bore	Mike Whitby	Paul Tilsley
Party	Labour	Conservative	Liberal Democrats
Leader's seat	Ladywood	Harborne	Sheldon
Seats won	57	39	24
Seat change	▲16	▼6	▼7
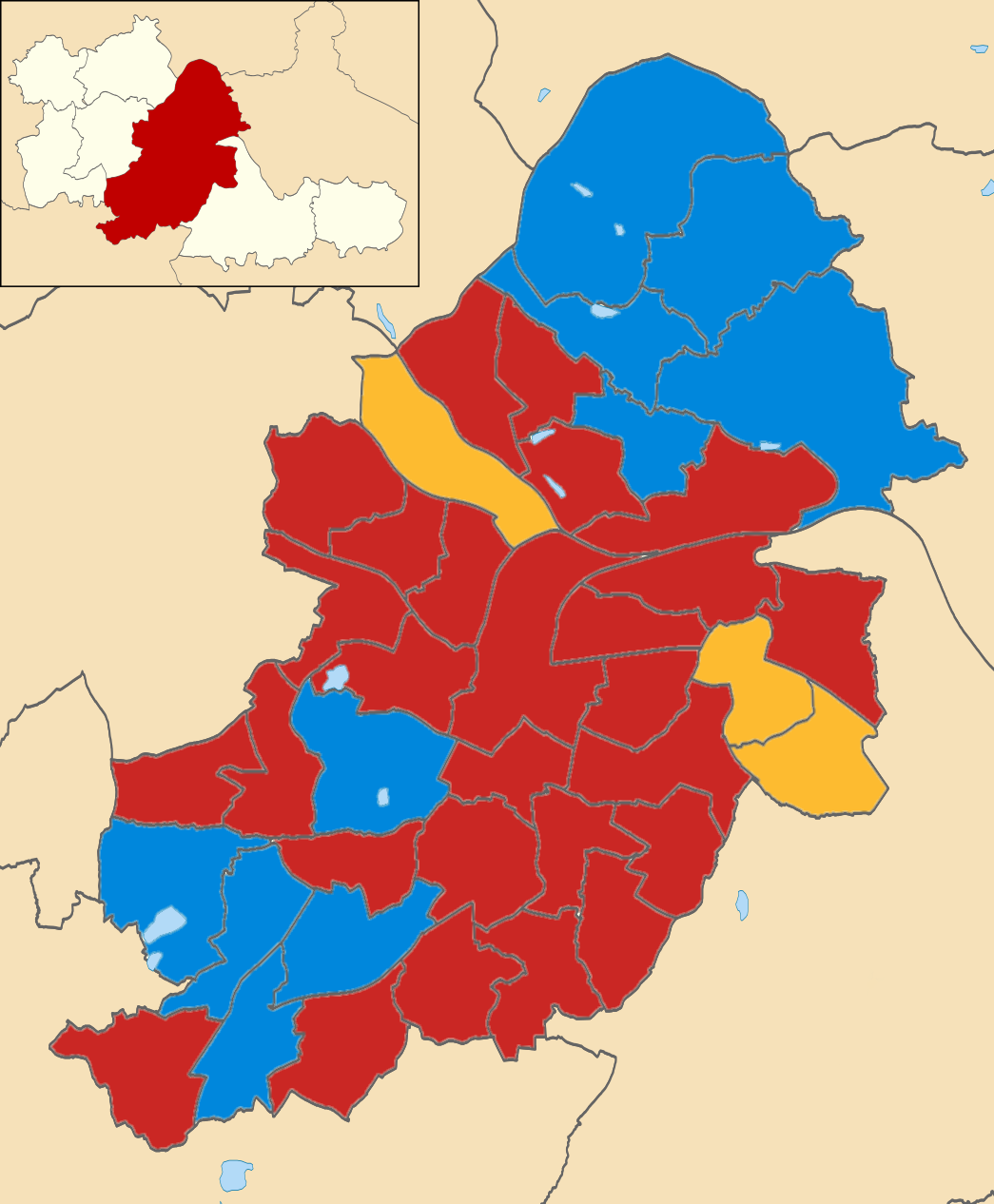
- 2011 local election results in Birmingham.
Council control before election
No Overall Control
Council control after election
No Overall Control

The 2011 Birmingham City Council Election took place to elect members of Birmingham City Council in the West Midlands, England. One third of the council was up for election, one seat in each of the city's 40 council wards. The election took place at the same day as the 2011 United Kingdom local elections.

== Election results ==
Birmingham local election result 2011
Party	Seats	Gains	Losses	Net gain/loss	Seats %	Votes %	Votes	+/−
Labour	57	▲16	0	▲16				
Conservative	39	0	▼6	▼6				
Liberal Democrats	24	0	▼7	▼7				
Respect	0	0	▼3	▼3	0.0			
BNP	0	Steady	Steady	Steady	0.0			
Green	0	Steady	Steady	Steady	0.0			
UKIP	0	Steady	Steady	Steady	0.0			
SDP	0	Steady	Steady	Steady	0.0			

== Ward results ==
Birmingham Council election, 2011: Acocks Green Electorate 19,787
Party	Candidate	Votes	%	±%
Labour	Stewart Stacey	3,102	48.03	▲15.5
Liberal Democrats	Penny Wagg*	2,161	33.46	▼8.4
Conservative	Joe Edginton	606	9.38	▼4.2
Green	Amanda Baker	277	4.29	▲1.6
UKIP	John Butler	275	4.26	▲2.1
Majority		941	14.57	
Turnout		6,459	32.64	
Labour gain from Liberal Democrats		Swing		

Birmingham Council election, 2011: Aston Electorate 19,982
Party	Candidate	Votes	%	±%
Labour	Muhammad Afzal*	4,562	62.42	▲7.6
Liberal Democrats	Monhammed Hanif	2,187	29.92	▼3.5
Conservative	Adam Felman	304	4.16	▼1.2
Green	Aby Alamgir	209	2.86	▲0.6
Majority		2,375	32.49	
Turnout		7,309	36.57	
Labour hold		Swing		

Birmingham Council election, 2011: Bartley Green Electorate 17,669
Party	Candidate	Votes	%	±%
Conservative	John Lines	3,429	55.08	▲10.1
Labour	Ash Piddington	2,036	32.70	▼0.2
BNP	Peter Hickman	341	5.48	▼2.5
Green	James Robertson	206	3.31	▲1.9
Liberal Democrats	Julia Garrett	181	2.91	▼9.9
Majority		1,393	22.37	
Turnout		6,226	35.23	
Conservative hold		Swing		

Birmingham Council election, 2011: Billesley
Party	Candidate	Votes	%	±%
Labour	Susan Burfoot	3,229	48.0	
Conservative	Susan Axford	2,459	36.6	
BNP	Paul Hickman	402	6.0	
Green	Jane Bradshaw	308	4.6	
Liberal Democrats	Lee Harvey	294	4.4	
Majority		770		
Turnout		19,182	35.1	

Birmingham Council election, 2011: Bordesley Green
Party	Candidate	Votes	%	±%
Labour	Shafique Shah	6,684	70.7	
Liberal Democrats	Nazir Hussain	1,668	17.6	
Respect	Fozia Ayub	514	5.4	
Conservative	Dominic Fisher	255	2.7	
Green	Huw Davies	155	1.6	
UKIP	Dale Wynde	127	1.3	
Majority		5,016		
Turnout		20,314		

Birmingham Council election, 2011: Bournville
Party	Candidate	Votes	%	±%
Conservative	Tim Huxtable	3,773	42.7	
Labour	Philip Walking	3,497	39.6	
Green	Joe Rooney	678	7.7	
Liberal Democrats	Tim Stimpson	600	6.8	
BNP	Darren Allen	253	2.9	
Majority		19,389		
Turnout			45.6	

Birmingham Council election, 2011: Brandwood
Party	Candidate	Votes	%	±%
Labour	Barry Henley	3,820	50,7	
Conservative	Lesley Sutton	2,424	32.2	
Liberal Democrats	Brian Alec Peace	470	6.2	
Green	Anna Masters	429	5.7	
BNP	Susan Evans	347	4.6	
Majority		1,396		
Turnout		18,598	40.5	

Birmingham Council election, 2011: Edgbaston
Party	Candidate	Votes	%	±%
Conservative	James Hutchings	2,555	41.7	▼10.2
Labour	Dennis Minnis	2,534	41.4	▲14.6
Liberal Democrats	Colin Green	472	7.6	▼4.2
Green	Peter Tinsley	414	6.7	▼0.5
UKIP	Glenda Houston	145	2.34	N/A
Majority		21		
Turnout		6,120	33.9	

Birmingham Council election, 2011: Erdington
Party	Candidate	Votes	%	±%
Conservative	Gareth Moore	2,941	50.3	
Labour	Mark McKenzie	2,113	36.1	
Liberal Democrats	Philip Mills	279	4.8	
BNP	David Campion	240	4.1	
Green	Michael Hoskins	237	4.0	
Majority		828		
Turnout			34.5	

Birmingham Council election, 2011: Hall Green
Party	Candidate	Votes	%	±%
Labour	Sam Burden	3,489	42.7	
Conservative	Bob Harvey	2,686	32.9	
Liberal Democrats	Paul Smith	1,625	19.9	
Green	John Rafter	329	4.0	
Majority		803		
Turnout			42.6	

Birmingham Council election, 2011: Handsworth Wood
Party	Candidate	Votes	%	±%
Labour	Paulette Hamilton	3,956	50.5	
Conservative	Rabinder Gill	3,204	40.9	
Liberal Democrats	Kingsley Douglas	342	4.4	
Green	Ulla Grant	290	3.7	
Majority		752		
Turnout			40.7	

Birmingham Council election, 2011: Harborne
Party	Candidate	Votes	%	±%
Labour	James Robert McKay	3,655	46.6	
Conservative	Geoff Hewitt	3,071	39.2	
Green	Phil Simpson	633	8.1	
Liberal Democrats	Christopher Bates	426	5.4	
Majority		584		
Turnout			46.1	

Birmingham Council election, 2011: Hodge Hill
Party	Candidate	Votes	%	±%
Labour	Majid Mahmood	3,958	58.2	
Liberal Democrats	Gwyn Neilly	1,572	23.1	
Conservative	Ash Zaman	605	8.9	
UKIP	Adrian Duffen	359	5.3	
SDP	Peter Johnson	136	2.00	
Green	Helen Sauntson	134	2.0	
Majority		2,386		
Turnout			38.0	

Birmingham Council election, 2011: Kings Norton
Party	Candidate	Votes	%	±%
Labour	Peter Griffiths	2,762	45.2	
Conservative	Barbara Wood	2,425	39.7	
BNP	Frances Waldron	350	5.7	
Liberal Democrats	Robert Ball	285	4.7	
Green	Ged Hickman	253	4.1	
Majority		337		
Turnout			36.2	

Birmingham Council election, 2011: Kingstanding
Party	Candidate	Votes	%	±%
Labour	Peter Kane	2,209	45.4	
Conservative	Gary Sambrook	2,035	41.8	
BNP	Eileen Hickman	344	7.1	
Liberal Democrats	Hubert Duffy	128	2.6	
Green	Tony O'Sullivan	121	2.5	
Majority		17,270		
Turnout			28.2	

Birmingham Council election, 2011: Ladywood
Party	Candidate	Votes	%	±%
Labour	Albert Bore	2,787	59.7	
Conservative	Parveen Hassan	992	21.3	
Green	Hazel Clawley	506	10.8	
Liberal Democrats	Mohammed Usman	344	7.4	
Majority		4,669		
Turnout			23.9	

Birmingham Council election, 2011: Longbridge
Party	Candidate	Votes	%	±%
Labour	Andy Cartwright	2,635	46.5	
Conservative	Keith Barton	2,188	38.6	
BNP	Lynette Orton	320	5.6	
Liberal Democrats	Claire Berwick	276	4.8	
Green	Colin Marriott	221	3.9	
Majority		447		
Turnout			30.9	

Birmingham Council election, 2011: Lozells and East Handsworth
Party	Candidate	Votes	%	±%
Labour	Waseem Zaffar	5,408	70.4	
Liberal Democrats	Sabirul Islam	1,483	19.3	
Green	David Toke	367	4.8	
Conservative	Talib Hussain	364	4.7	
Majority		3,925		
Turnout			40.6	

Birmingham Council election, 2011: Moseley and Kings Heath
Party	Candidate	Votes	%	±%
Labour	Martin Straker-Welds	4,188	48.9	
Liberal Democrats	Emily Cox	2,312	27.0	
Conservative	John Turner	980	11.5	
Green	William Lilley	818	9.6	
UKIP	Alan Blumenthal	200	2.3	
Majority		1,876		
Turnout			45.3	

Birmingham Council election, 2011: Nechells
Party	Candidate	Votes	%	±%
Labour	Yvonne Mosquito	3,118	59.6	
Liberal Democrats	Shazad Iqbal	1,274	24.3	
Conservative	Aaron Powell	479	9.2	
Green	Janet Assheton	314	6.00	
Majority			1,844	
Turnout			25.1	

Birmingham Council election, 2011: Northfield
Party	Candidate	Votes	%	±%
Conservative	Reg Corns	2,887	42.0	
Labour	Winnie Flanagan	2,833	41.2	
BNP	Leslie Orton	427	6.2	
Liberal Democrats	Andy Moles	345	5.0	
Green	Kirsty Axe	265	5.3	
Majority		54		
Turnout			36.0	

Birmingham Council election, 2011: Oscott
Party	Candidate	Votes	%	±%
Labour	Keith Linnecor	3,539	58.0	
Conservative	Maria Anna Green	3,457	28.8	
BNP	Howard Hamilton	391	6.4	
Liberal Democrats	Nick Jolliffe	217	3.6	
Green	Harry Eyles	174	2.9	
Majority		1,783		
Turnout			33.7	

Birmingham Council election, 2011: Perry Barr
Party	Candidate	Votes	%	±%
Liberal Democrats	Jon Hunt	2,795	46.4	
Labour	Brian Lloyd Rhoden	2,457	40.8	
Conservative	Derek Johnson	725	12.0	
Majority		338		
Turnout			35.3	

Birmingham Council election, 2011: Quinton
Party	Candidate	Votes	%	±%
Labour	John Clancy	3,707	50.3	
Conservative	Leonard Clark	2,849	38.7	
Green	Peter Beck	270	3.7	
BNP	Stuart James Bates	267	3.62	
Liberal Democrats	Ian Garrett	246	3.34	
Majority		858		
Turnout			42.2	

Birmingham Council election, 2011: Selly Oak
Party	Candidate	Votes	%	±%
Labour	Brigid Jones	2,855	43.6	
Liberal Democrats	Robert Wright	1,633	25.1	
Conservative	Owen Williams	1,170	17.9	
Green	Charlene Bale	597	9.11	
UKIP	Peter Hughes	220	3.36	
Majority		1,212		
Turnout			34.20	

Birmingham Council election, 2011: Shard End
Party	Candidate	Votes	%	±%
Labour	Ian Ward	2,609	55.9	
Conservative	Jessie Holland	937	20.1	
UKIP	Iain Roden	419	9.0	
BNP	Morris Vincent	307	6.6	
Liberal Democrats	Blair Kesseler	179	3.8	
Green	Tracie Hammond	166	3.6	
SDP	Joyce Ware	23	0.5	
Majority		1,672		
Turnout		4,666	25.2	

Birmingham Council election, 2011: Sheldon
Party	Candidate	Votes	%	±%
Liberal Democrats	Paul Tilsley	2,971	52.7	
Labour	Brendan O'Brien	1,447	25.7	
Conservative	Amil Khan	470	8.3	
UKIP	Richard Allen	325	5.8	
BNP	Amanda Bowyer	305	5.4	
Green	Alan Clawley	85	1.5	
SDP	Joylan Charlotte Ware	19	0.3	
Majority		1,524		
Turnout		5,635	35.0	

Birmingham Council election, 2011: Soho
Party	Candidate	Votes	%	±%
Labour	Sybil Spence	4,572	71.7	
Liberal Democrats	Mohammed Yaseen	1,107	17.4	
Conservative	Robert John Higginson	448	7.0	
Green	Steven Austin	212	3.3	
Majority		3,465		
Turnout		6,380	35.8	

Birmingham Council election, 2011: South Yardley
Party	Candidate	Votes	%	±%
Labour	Nawaz Ali	2,975	44.3	
Liberal Democrats	David Osborne	2,780	41.4	
UKIP	Albert Duffen	412	6.13	
Conservative	Sahar Rezazdeh	321	4.8	
Green	Rianne Ten Veen	194	2.9	
Majority		195		
Turnout		6,722	33.5	

Birmingham Council election, 2011: Sparkbrook
Party	Candidate	Votes	%	±%
Labour	Tony Kennedy	4,382	49.5	
Respect	Mohammed Ishtiaq	3,413	38.6	
Liberal Democrats	Jahangir Khan	569	6.4	
Conservative	Andrew Hardie	243	2.8	
Green	Charles John Alldrick	192	2.2	
Majority		969		
Turnout		8,849	45.0	

Birmingham Council election, 2011: Springfield
Party	Candidate	Votes	%	±%
Labour	Habib Rehman	4,791	54.0	
Liberal Democrats	Tanveer Choudhry	2,029	22.9	
Respect	Rana Nazir	1,209	13.6	
Conservative	Paul Newman	516	5.8	
Green	Ian Jamieson	239	2.8	
Majority		2,762		
Turnout		8,865	43.8	

Birmingham Council election, 2011: Stechford and Yardley North
Party	Candidate	Votes	%	±%
Liberal Democrats	Barbara Jackson	2,514	42.3	
Labour	Lorraine Owen	2,120	35.6	
Conservative	Robert McKenzie Clark	578	9.7	
UKIP	Graham Duffen	552	9.3	
Green	Eric Fairclough	136	2.3	
Majority		394		
Turnout		5,950	32.8	

Birmingham Council election, 2011: Stockland Green
Party	Candidate	Votes	%	±%
Labour	Mick Finnegan	3,043	55.2	
Conservative	Ash Kayani	1,638	29.7	
Liberal Democrats	Franklyn Earlynton Aaron	366	6.6	
BNP	Trevor Shearer	220	4.0	
Green	Elly Stanton	210	3.8	
Majority		1,405		
Turnout		5,514	32.0	

Birmingham Council election, 2011: Sutton Four Oaks
Party	Candidate	Votes	%	±%
Conservative	Maureen Cornish	5,807	69.9	
Labour	Manish Puri	1,138	13.7	
Liberal Democrats	Sidney Woods	676	8.1	
Green	David Ratcliff	634	7.6	
Majority		4,669		
Turnout		8,313	43.6	

Birmingham Council election, 2011: Sutton New Hall
Party	Candidate	Votes	%	±%
Conservative	Barrie Brindley	4,304		
Labour	Ian Osborne	1,602		
Green	Andrew Williams	439		
Liberal Democrats	Lynn	436		
Majority		2,702		
Turnout				

Birmingham Council election, 2011: Sutton Trinity
Party	Candidate	Votes	%	±%
Conservative	David Pears	4,321		
Labour	Roger Barley	1,936	26.0	
Liberal Democrats	Maureen Parker	676	9.1	
Green	Rod Palmer	467	6.3	
Majority		2,385		
Turnout		7,453	37.7	

Birmingham Council election, 2011: Sutton Vesey
Party	Candidate	Votes	%	±%
Conservative	Colin Lyn	3,864	49.0	
Labour	Robert Pocock	3,118	39.5	
Liberal Democrats	Gareth Hardy	436	5.5	
Majority		746		
Turnout		7,891	42.6	

Birmingham Council election, 2011: Tyburn
Party	Candidate	Votes	%	±%
Labour	Mike Sharpe	2,500		
Conservative	Gerald Brien	1,033	21.8	
Liberal Democrats	Trevor Holtom	963	20.3	
Green	Lee Moore	199	4.2	
Majority		1,467		
Turnout		4,736	27.3	

Birmingham Council election, 2011: Washwood Heath
Party	Candidate	Votes	%	±%
Labour	Ansar Khan	8,268	88.4	
Liberal Democrats	Lorraine Jones	423	4.5	
Conservative	Douglas Pullen	259	2.8	
Green	John Bentley	204	2.2	
UKIP	Maurice Eden	131	1.4	
Majority				
Turnout				

Birmingham Council election, 2011: Weoley
Party	Candidate	Votes	%	±%
Conservative	Adrian Delaney	2,599	41.7	
Labour Co-op	Chris Hillcox	2,587	41.5	
Liberal Democrats	Trevor Sword	402	6.4	
Green	David Williams	312	5	
BNP	John Grainger	305	4.9	
Majority		12		
Turnout		6,239	35.3	
