= 2016 Birmingham City Council election =

← 2015	5 May 2016	2018 →

One third (40) seats to Birmingham City Council 61 seats needed for a majority
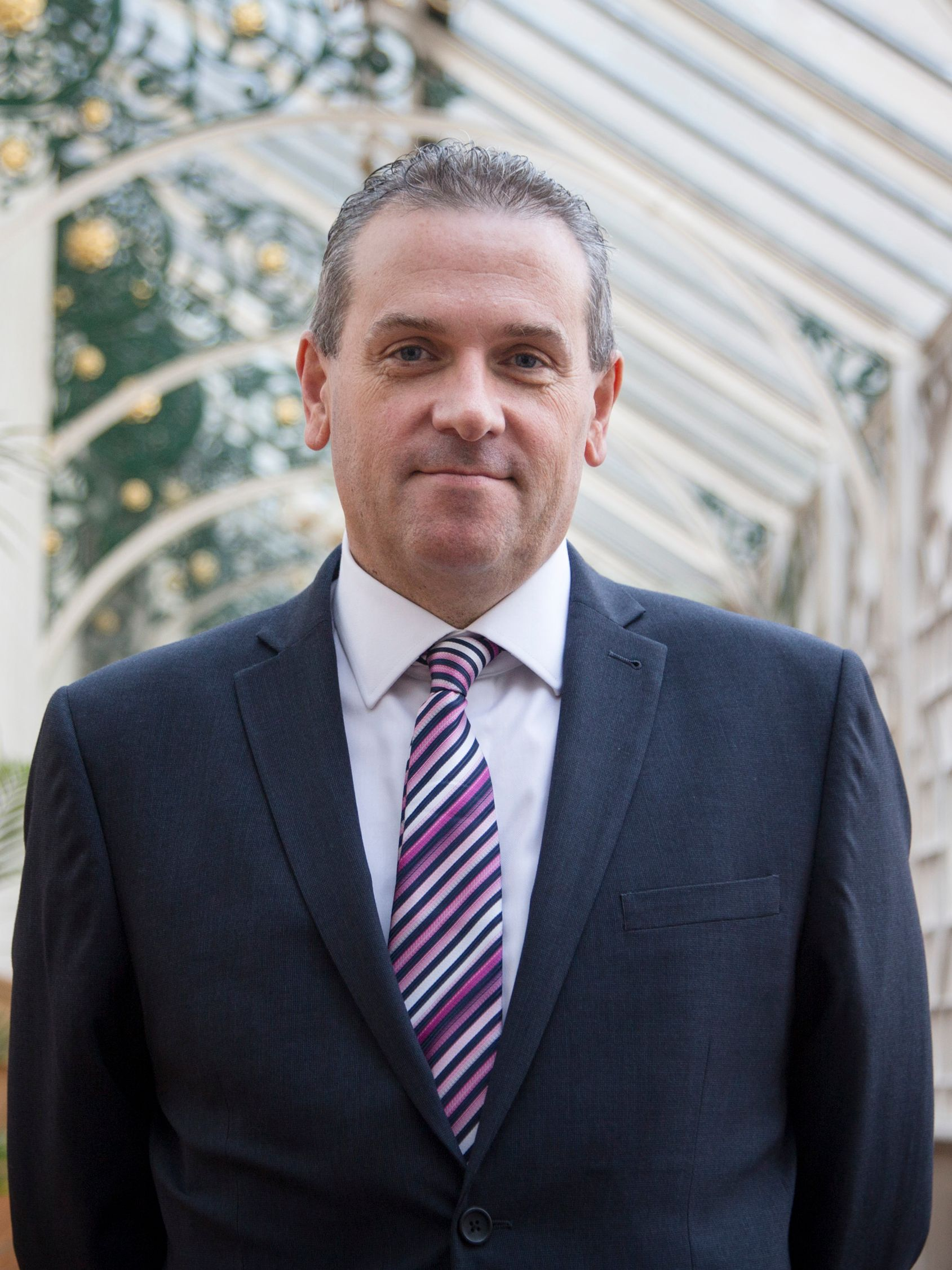

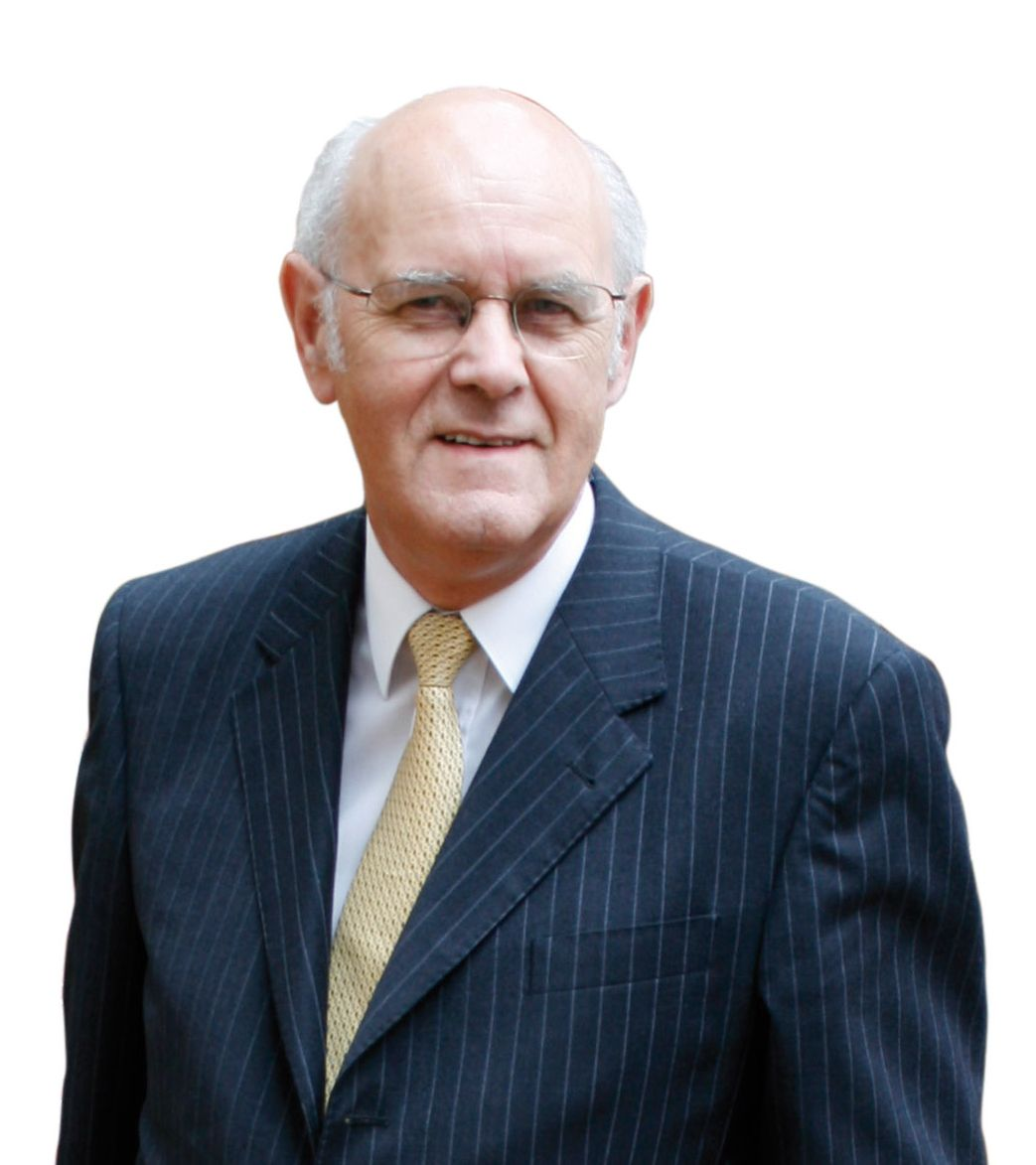
	First party	Second party	Third party
Leader	John Clancy	Robert Alden	Paul Tilsley
Party	Labour	Conservative	Liberal Democrats
Leader's seat	Quinton	Erdington	Sheldon
Seats before	77 (Note: Labour had previously held 78 seats until one Labour councillor's seat became vacant before the election.)	30	11
Seats after	80	29	10
Seat change	▲3	▼1	▼1
Popular vote	113,018	50,828	26,877
Percentage	51.09%	22.98%	12.15%
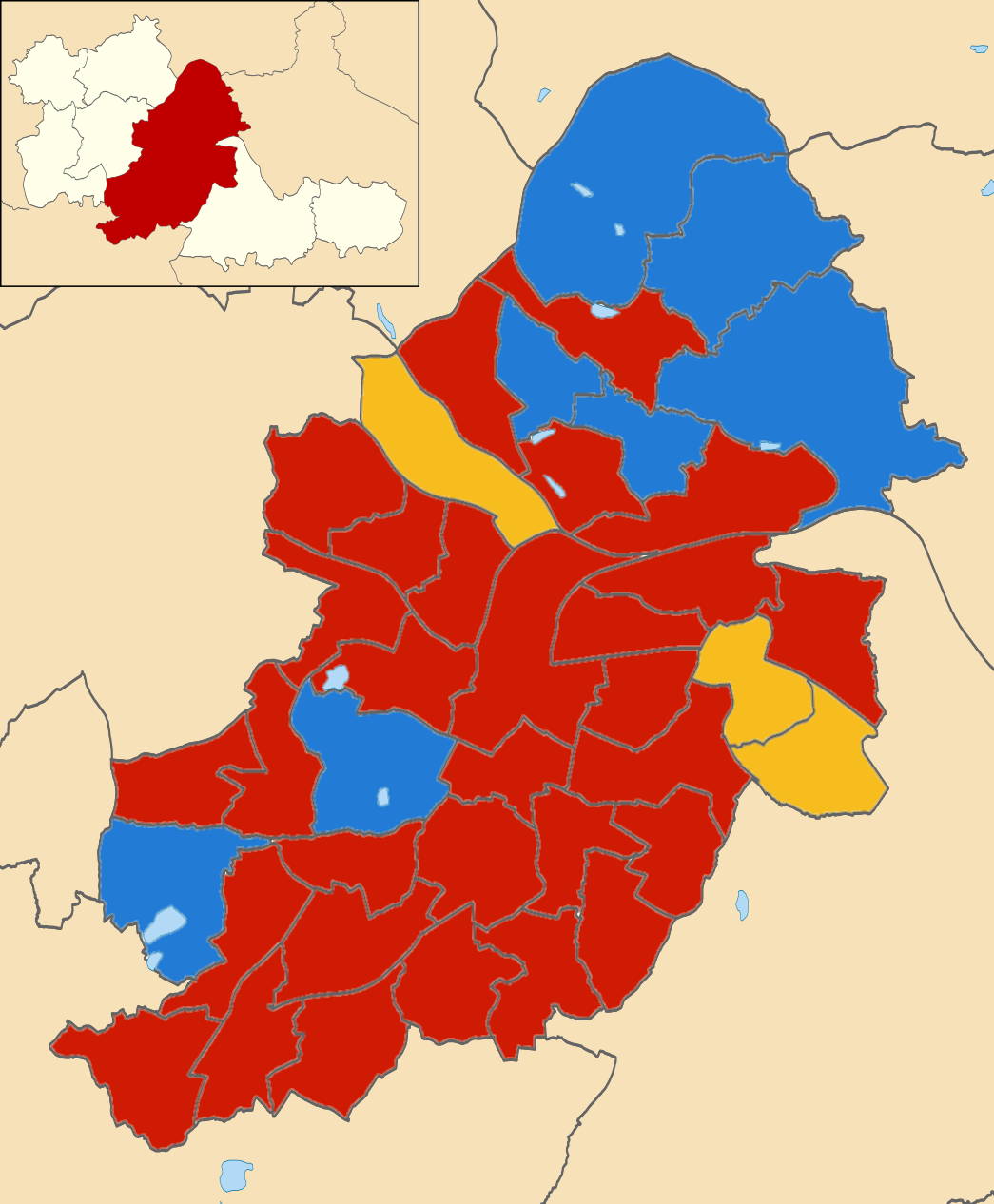
- 2016 local election results in Birmingham.
Council control before election
John Clancy
Labour
Council control after election
John Clancy
Labour

The 2016 Birmingham City Council election took place on 5 May 2016 to elect one third of the members of Birmingham City Council in England. The election was held on the same day as the election of a Police and Crime Commissioner for the West Midlands as part of the 2016 Police and Crime Commissioner elections.

Labour increased their hold on the City Council, winning 30 of the 40 seats up for election, gaining 1 from the Conservatives and 1 from the Liberal Democrats as well as retaining 1 previously vacant seat formerly held by a Labour Councillor.

== Result ==
Birmingham City Council election result, 2016
Party	Seats	Gains	Losses	Net gain/loss	Seats %	Votes %	Votes	+/−
Labour	30	▲2	0	▲2	75.0	51.1	113,018	▲3,177
Conservative	7	0	▼1	▼1	17.5	23.0	50,828	▼662
Liberal Democrats	3	0	▼1	▼1	7.5	12.2	26,877	▼7,830
UKIP	0	Steady	Steady	0	0.0	8.1	17,801	▼12,886
Green	0	Steady	Steady	0	0.0	4.5	9,920	▼217
Independent	0	Steady	Steady	0	0.0	0.5	989	▲844
TUSC	0	Steady	Steady	0	0.0	0.4	937	▲879
Socialist Labour	0	Steady	Steady	0	0.0	0.2	358	▼71
Christian	0	Steady	Steady	0	0.0	0.1	310	▲132
National Front	0	Steady	Steady	0	0.0	0.1	104	▼39
SDP	0	Steady	Steady	0	0.0	0.0	58	▼4
Totals	40						221,200	

== Ward results ==
=== Acocks Green ===
Acocks Green 2016
Party	Candidate	Votes	%	±%
Labour	John O'Shea	2,760	48.0	▲5.3
Liberal Democrats	Penny Wagg	2,136	37.1	▼2.1
Conservative	Richard Sparkes	467	8.1	▼3.2
Green	Amanda Baker	225	3.9	▲0.6
TUSC	Eamonn Flynn	131	2.3	▲1.2
SDP	Alan Ware	32	0.6	▲0.3
Majority		624	10.9	▲7.4
Turnout		5,751	30.4	
Labour hold		Swing	▲3.7	

=== Aston ===
Aston 2016
Party	Candidate	Votes	%	±%
Labour	Nagina Kauser	5,047	88.6	▲38.1
Conservative	Jahid Choudhury	208	3.7	▲1.7
Green	Christopher Garghan	181	3.2	▲1.9
Christian	Adrian Dawkins	159	2.8	−
Liberal Democrats	Yaser Iqbal	100	1.8	▼42.4
Majority		4,839	85.0	▲78.7
Turnout		5,695	32.2	
Labour hold		Swing	▲18.2	

=== Bartley Green ===
Bartley Green 2016
Party	Candidate	Votes	%	±%
Conservative	Des Flood	2,080	45.0	▼1.5
Labour	Saddak Miah	1,270	27.5	▼3.7
UKIP	Tony Hayes	827	17.9	▲1.8
Green	Peter Thorneycroft	216	4.7	▼0.9
Liberal Democrats	Julia Garrett	165	3.6	▲1.4
TUSC	Moira O'Driscoll	62	1.3	
Majority		810	17.5	
Turnout		4,620	27.3	
Conservative hold		Swing		

=== Billesley ===
Billesley 2016
Party	Candidate	Votes	%	±%
Labour	Phil Davis	2,730	52.2	
UKIP	James Dalton	1,052	20.1	
Conservative	Aaron Humphriss	1,045	20.0	
Green	Clare Thomas	218	4.2	
Liberal Democrats	Alan Morrow	187	3.6	
Majority		1,678	32.1	
Turnout		5,232	28.4	
Labour hold		Swing		

=== Bordesley Green ===
Bordesley Green 2016
Party	Candidate	Votes	%	±%
Labour	Uzma Ahmed	4,300	58.3	▼16.9
Liberal Democrats	Shaukat Khan	2,298	31.2	▼17.1
UKIP	Mohammed Khan	337	4.6	▲4.6
Green	Alan Clawley	242	3.3	▼1.7
Conservative	Guy Hordern	198	2.7	▼2.3
Majority		2,002	27.1	
Turnout		7,375	37.2	
Labour hold		Swing		

=== Bournville ===
Bournville 2016
Party	Candidate	Votes	%	±%
Labour	Mary Locke	3,408	42.9	▲6.4
Conservative	Nigel Dawkins	3,095	38.9	▼1.9
Green	Ian Jamieson	695	8.7	▼1.1
UKIP	Sylvia Tempest-Jones	514	6.5	▼2.4
Liberal Democrats	Robert Gilliam	196	2.4	▼1.6
Majority		313	3.9	
Turnout		7,948	42.3	
Labour hold		Swing	▲4.2	

=== Brandwood ===
Brandwood 2016
Party	Candidate	Votes	%	±%
Labour	Eva Phillips	3,520	56.1	▲9.8
Conservative	Neville Summerfield	1,485	23.7	▼5.4
UKIP	Alan Blumenthal	813	13.0	▼1.6
Green	Patrick Cox	266	4.2	▼1.6
Liberal Democrats	Richard Smith	186	3.0	▼1.2
Majority		2,035	32.4	
Turnout		6,270	35.1	
Labour hold		Swing		

=== Edgbaston ===
Edgbaston 2016
Party	Candidate	Votes	%	±%
Conservative	Deirdre Alden	2,043	44.6	▲2.1
Labour	Tom Keeley	1,967	42.9	▲2.3
Green	Joe Belcher	222	4.8	▼3.2
UKIP	Peter Hughes	180	3.9	▼0.5
Liberal Democrats	Lee Dargue	174	3.8	▼0.7
Majority		76	1.7	
Turnout		4,586	32.3	
Conservative hold		Swing		

=== Erdington ===
Erdington 2016
Party	Candidate	Votes	%	±%
Conservative	Bob Beauchamp	2,722	53.0	▲9.7
Labour	Keith Heron	1,701	33.1	▼2.9
UKIP	Steve Cooling	462	9.0	▼3.8
Green	Joe Rooney	122	2.4	▼1.0
Liberal Democrats	Philip Mills	103	2.0	▼0.6
TUSC	Joe Foster	30	0.6	▼0.3
Majority		1,021	19.9	
Turnout		5,140	31.9	
Conservative hold		Swing		

=== Hall Green ===
Hall Green 2016
Party	Candidate	Votes	%	±%
Labour	Barry Bowles	2,827	42.2	▲1.8
Conservative	Tom Skidmore	1,823	27.2	▲3.6
Independent	Bob Harvey	989	14.8	▲6.7
Liberal Democrats	Tavneer Choudhry	467	7.0	▼9.4
UKIP	Malcolm Mummery	400	6.1	▼1.8
Green	Rachel Xerri-Brooks	162	2.4	▼0.8
TUSC	David Wright	20	0.3	▼0.1
Majority		1,004	5.9	
Turnout		6,688	35.2	
Labour hold		Swing		

=== Handsworth Wood ===
Handsworth Wood 2016
Party	Candidate	Votes	%	±%
Labour	Gurdial Atwal	3,743	66.8	▲2.9
Conservative	Sukhwinder Sungu	863	15.4	▲7.1
Green	Chloe Juliette	370	6.6	▲2.5
Socialist Labour	John Tyrrell	358	6.4	▲4.8
Liberal Democrats	Valvinder Kaur	267	4.8	▲1.3
Majority		2,880	51.4	
Turnout		5,601	30.7	
Labour hold		Swing		

=== Harborne ===
Harborne 2016
Party	Candidate	Votes	%	±%
Labour	Jayne Francis	2,841	44.7	▲1.7
Conservative	Akaal Sidhu	2,404	37.8	▼0.5
Green	Phil Simpson	494	7.8	▼0.6
UKIP	Mary Morris	376	5.9	▲0.2
Liberal Democrats	Philip Banting	240	3.8	▼0.8
Majority		437	6.9	▲2.2
Turnout		6,355	39.2	
Labour hold		Swing		

=== Hodge Hill ===
Hodge Hill 2016
Party	Candidate	Votes	%	±%
Labour	Diane Donaldson	3,433	66.0	▲5.0
UKIP	David Bridges	680	13.1	▼2.2
Liberal Democrats	Gwyn Neilly	542	10.4	▲6.6
Conservative	Parveen Hassan	405	7.8	▼8.7
Green	Michael Harrison	114	2.2	▼0.5
SDP	Peter Johnson	26	0.5	▲0.5
Majority		2,753	52.9	▲8.4
Turnout		5,200	29.8	
Labour hold		Swing		

=== Kings Norton ===
Kings Norton 2016
Party	Candidate	Votes	%	±%
Labour	Valerie Seabright	1,834	38.7	▼0.5
Conservative	Barbara Wood	1,811	38.3	▲0.3
UKIP	Tim Plumbe	722	15.3	▼0.4
Liberal Democrats	Peter Lloyd	196	4.1	▲1.2
Green	Eleanor Masters	172	3.6	▼0.6
Majority		23	0.5	▼0.7
Turnout		4,735	29.3	
Labour hold		Swing		

=== Kingstanding ===
Kingstanding 2016
Party	Candidate	Votes	%	±%
Conservative	Gary Sambrook	1,858	43.5	▲11.8
Labour	Jane Jones	1,651	38.6	▼3.9
UKIP	Philip Davies	593	13.9	▼7.2
Green	Anne Okole	89	2.1	▼0.3
Liberal Democrats	Graham Lippiatt	48	1.1	▼0.5
National Front	Terry Williams	21	0.5	▲0.5
TUSC	Joseph Derbyshire	16	0.4	▼0.3
Majority		207	4.8	▼6.0
Turnout		4,276	26.1	
Conservative hold		Swing		

=== Ladywood ===
Ladywood 2016
Party	Candidate	Votes	%	±%
Labour	Kath Hartley	2,337	62.7	▲10.7
Conservative	Rob Coleman	735	19.7	▼5.3
Green	Sara Myers	372	10.0	▼0.9
Liberal Democrats	Gareth Hardy	284	7.6	▲1.8
Majority		1,602	43.0	▲16.0
Turnout		3,728	22.0	
Labour hold		Swing		

=== Longbridge ===
Longbridge 2016
Party	Candidate	Votes	%	±%
Labour	Carole Griffiths	1,753	39.74	
Conservative	Dan Caldicott	1,316	29.83	
UKIP	Kevin Morris	993	22.51	
Green	Elizabeth Sharman	152	3.45	
Liberal Democrats	Kevin Hannon	147	3.33	
TUSC	Clive Walder	50	1.13	
Majority		437	9.91	
Turnout		4,411		
Labour hold		Swing		

=== Lozells and East Handsworth ===
Lozells and East Handsworth 2016
Party	Candidate	Votes	%	±%
Labour	Mahmood Hussain	4,967		
Conservative	Ravi Chumber	448		
Green	Hazel Clawley	295		
Liberal Democrats	Baljinder Kaur	250		
Majority		4,519		
Turnout				
Labour hold		Swing		

=== Moseley and Kings Heath ===
Moseley and Kings Heath 2016
Party	Candidate	Votes	%	±%
Labour	Lisa Trickett	4,029	55.3%	
Liberal Democrats	Martin Mullaney	1,945	26.7%	
Green	Robert Grant	554	7.6%	
Conservative	Owen Williams	522	7.2%	
UKIP	Kenneth Lowry	231	3.2%	
Majority		2,084		
Turnout		7281		
Labour hold		Swing		

=== Nechells ===
Nechells 2016
Party	Candidate	Votes	%	±%
Labour	Tahir Ali	3,405		
Conservative	Emma Watkins	414		
Green	Janet Assheton	295		
Liberal Democrats	Nicholas Jolliffe	174		
Majority		2,991		
Turnout				
Labour hold		Swing		

=== Northfield ===
Northfield 2016
Party	Candidate	Votes	%	±%
Labour	Brett O'Reilly	2,283	38.93	
Conservative	Les Lawrence	2,098	35.78	
UKIP	Keith Rowe	752	12.82	
Green	Fiona Nunan	575	9.81	
Liberal Democrats	Andy Moles	156	2.66	
Majority		185	3.15	
Turnout		5,864		
Labour hold		Swing		

=== Oscott ===
Oscott 2016
Party	Candidate	Votes	%	±%
Labour	Tristan Chatfield	2,042		
Conservative	Graham Green	1,100		
UKIP	Roger Tempest	926		
Liberal Democrats	Andrew Fullylove	164		
Green	Harry Eyles	108		
National Front	Adrian Davidson	37		
Majority		942		
Turnout				
Labour hold		Swing		

=== Perry Barr ===
Perry Barr 2016
Party	Candidate	Votes	%	±%
Liberal Democrats	Ray Hassall	3,248		
Labour	Mohammed Hanif	2,085		
Conservative	Alain Hurst	338		
Green	Beck Collins	200		
Majority		1,163		
Turnout				
Liberal Democrats hold		Swing		

=== Quinton ===
Quinton 2016
Party	Candidate	Votes	%	±%
Labour	Kate Booth	2,668	45.89	
Conservative	Georgina Chandler	2,067	35.55	
UKIP	Martin Barrett	641	11.03	
Green	James Robertson	225	3.87	
Liberal Democrats	Ian Garrett	185	3.18	
TUSC	Nick Hart	28	0.48	
Majority		601	10.34	
Turnout		5,814		
Labour hold		Swing		

=== Selly Oak ===
Selly Oak 2016
Party	Candidate	Votes	%	±%
Labour	Karen McCarthy	2,141	51.5	▲6
Conservative	Monica Hardie	779	18.7	▼4
Liberal Democrats	Colin Green	763	18.4	▲3.2
Green	Daniel Wilshire	381	9	▼3.2
TUSC	Theo Sharieff	67	1.6	▼0.4
Majority		1,362	32.8	▲13
Turnout		4,131		
Labour hold		Swing	▲5	

=== Shard End ===
Shard End 2016
Party	Candidate	Votes	%	±%
Labour	Marjorie Bridle	2,437		
UKIP	Paul Clayton	1,178		
Conservative	Nick Psirides	284		
Green	Sam Braithwaite	106		
Liberal Democrats	Christopher Barber	104		
Majority		1,259		
Turnout				
Labour hold		Swing		

=== Sheldon ===
Sheldon 2016
Party	Candidate	Votes	%	±%
Liberal Democrats	Sue Anderson	2,742	58.41	
Labour	Bob Collins	928	19.77	
UKIP	Attiqa Khan	486	10.35	
Conservative	Alexander Hall	314	6.69	
Green	Max Ramsay	142	3.03	
National Front	Paul Morris	46	0.98	
TUSC	Richard Carter	36	0.77	
Majority		1,814	38.65	
Turnout		4,694		
Liberal Democrats hold		Swing		

=== Soho ===
Soho 2016
Party	Candidate	Votes	%	±%
Labour	Chaman Lal	4,263		
Conservative	Robert Higginson	440		
Green	Kefentse Dennis	262		
Liberal Democrats	Morriam Jan	193		
Christian	Pastor Gabriel Ukandu	151		
Majority		3,823		
Turnout				
Labour hold		Swing		

=== South Yardley ===
South Yardley 2016
Party	Candidate	Votes	%	±%
Labour	Zafar Iqbal	3,112		
Liberal Democrats	Baber Baz	2,361		
Conservative	Neil Shastri-Hurst	408		
TUSC	Mark Andrews	372		
Green	Ulla Grant	207		
Majority		751		
Turnout				
Labour hold		Swing		

=== Sparkbrook ===
Sparkbrook 2016
Party	Candidate	Votes	%	±%
Labour	Mohammed Azim	6,069	87.61	
Conservative	Santhi Rajakaruna	343	4.95	
Green	Elly Stanton	307	4.43	
Liberal Democrats	Blair Kesseler	208	3.00	
Majority		5,726	82.66	
Turnout		6,927		
Labour hold		Swing		

=== Springfield ===
Springfield 2016
Party	Candidate	Votes	%	±%
Labour	Shabrana Hussain	3,828	47.44	
Liberal Democrats	Jerry Evans	3,775	46.78	
Conservative	Adam Higgs	292	3.62	
Green	Seeyam Brijmohun	174	2.16	
Majority		53	0.66	
Turnout		8,069		
Labour gain from Liberal Democrats		Swing		

=== Stechford and Yardley North ===
Stechford and Yardley North 2016
Party	Candidate	Votes	%	±%
Liberal Democrats	Neil Eustace	3,001		
Labour	Cheryl Garvey	1,721		
UKIP	Graham Duffen	580		
Conservative	Mary Storer	193		
Green	Julien Pritchard	70		
Majority		1,280		
Turnout				
Liberal Democrats hold		Swing		

=== Stockland Green ===
Stockland Green 2016
Party	Candidate	Votes	%	±%
Labour	Josh Jones	2,533		
Conservative	Leona Leung	698		
UKIP	Albert Meehan	535		
Liberal Democrats	Franklyn Aaron	189		
Green	Darren Smith	133		
TUSC	Ted Woodley	71		
Majority		1,835		
Turnout				
Labour hold		Swing		

=== Sutton Four Oaks ===
Sutton Four Oaks 2016
Party	Candidate	Votes	%	±%
Conservative	Meirion Jenkins	4,022	61.67	
Labour	Peter French	970	14.87	
UKIP	Stephen Shorrock	845	12.96	
Liberal Democrats	Hubert Duffy	354	5.43	
Green	David Ratcliff	331	5.08	
Majority		3,052	46.80	
Turnout		6,522		
Conservative hold		Swing		

=== Sutton New Hall ===
Sutton New Hall 2016
Party	Candidate	Votes	%	±%
Conservative	Alex Yip	3,277	58.71	
Labour	Ian Brindley	1,007	18.04	
UKIP	Stewart Cotterill	856	15.34	
Green	Colin Marriott	231	4.14	
Liberal Democrats	Trevor Holtom	211	3.78	
Majority		2,270	40.67	
Turnout		5582		
Conservative hold		Swing		

=== Sutton Trinity ===
Sutton Trinity 2016
Party	Candidate	Votes	%	±%
Conservative	Margaret Waddington	2,890		
Labour	Roger Barley	1,265		
UKIP	Michael Joyce	879		
Liberal Democrats	Jennifer Wilkinson	360		
Green	Eloise England	309		
Majority		1,625		
Turnout				
Conservative hold		Swing		

=== Sutton Vesey ===
Sutton Vesey 2016
Party	Candidate	Votes	%	±%
Labour	Rob Pocock	4,102		
Conservative	Suzanne Webb	2,303		
UKIP	Maureen Smith	457		
Green	Zoe Challenor	163		
Liberal Democrats	Sally Lippiatt	163		
Majority		1,799		
Turnout				
Labour hold		Swing		

=== Tyburn ===
Tyburn 2016
Party	Candidate	Votes	%	±%
Labour	Mick Brown	1,780		
UKIP	Andrew Garcarz	747		
Conservative	Clifton Welch	747		
Liberal Democrats	Ann Holtom	318		
Green	Giovanni Esposito	86		
TUSC	Marie O'Connor	54		
Majority		1,033		
Turnout				
Labour hold		Swing		

=== Washwood Heath ===
Washwood Heath 2016
Party	Candidate	Votes	%	±%
Labour	Mariam Khan	6,136	81.15	
Liberal Democrats	Shamsur Rehman	821	10.86	
Conservative	Adrian Delaney	350	4.63	
Green	Jane McKears	254	3.36	
Majority		5,315	70.29	
Turnout		7,561		
Labour hold		Swing		

=== Weoley ===
Weoley 2016
Party	Candidate	Votes	%	±%
Labour	Julie Johnson	2,125	40.71	
Conservative	Eddie Freeman	1,943	37.22	
UKIP	Steven Brookes	739	14.16	
Liberal Democrats	Steve Haynes	213	4.08	
Green	Ben Kerr-Morgan	200	3.83	
Majority		182	3.49	
Turnout		5,220		
Labour gain from Conservative		Swing		
