= 2018 Birmingham City Council election =

2018 local election in England

- 3 May 2018

All 101 seats to Birmingham City Council 51 seats needed for a majority

	First party	Second party
Leader	Ian Ward	Robert Alden
Party	Labour	Conservative
Leader's seat	Shard End	Erdington
Seats before	80	29
Seats after	67	25
Seat change	▼13 (Note: The large seat loss was caused by a change in the boundaries and number of overall seats.)	▼4
Popular vote	120,083	68,840
Percentage	50.2%	28.8%
Swing	▼0.3%	▲6.1%
	Third party	Fourth party
Leader	Jon Hunt	Julien Pritchard
Party	Liberal Democrats	Green
Leader's seat	Perry Barr	Druids Heath and Monyhull
Seats before	10	0
Seats after	8	1
Seat change	▼2	▲1
Popular vote	33,648	10,557
Percentage	14.1%	4.4%
Swing	▲0.9%	0.0%
- 2018 local election results in Birmingham.
Council control before election
Ian Ward
Labour
Council control after election
Ian Ward
Labour

The 2018 Birmingham City Council election is one of many local elections that took place in England on 3 May 2018. This was the first 'all-out' election for Birmingham City Council following a boundary review, which reduced the number of councillors from 120 to 101, serving 69 wards (previously 40 wards). Since the election, the city council has been composed of 37 single-member wards and 32 two-member wards.

== Eligibility to vote ==
All registered electors (British, Irish, Commonwealth and European Union citizens) who are aged 18 or over on polling day will be entitled to vote in the local elections. A person who has two homes (such as a university student having a term-time address and living at home during holidays) can register to vote at both addresses as long as they are not in the same electoral area, and can vote in the local elections for the two different local councils.

== Election results ==
=== Overall election result ===
Overall result compared with 2016.

Party	Councillors				Votes		
Party		Of total	Net			Of total	Net
Labour Party	67	66.3%	-13	67 / 101	120,083	50.2%	-0.3%
Conservative Party	25	24.8%	-4	25 / 101	68,840	28.8%	+6.1%
Liberal Democrats	8	7.9%	-2	8 / 101	33,648	14.1%	+0.9%
Green	1	1.0%	+1	1 / 101	10,557	4.4%	-
Independent	0	0.0%	-1	0 / 101	4,765	2.0%	+1.6%
Trade Unionist and Socialist Coalition	0	0.0%	0	0 / 101	750	0.3%	-0.1%
Communist	0	0.0%	0	0 / 101	296	0.1%	N/A
Liberal	0	0.0%	0	0 / 101	170	0.1%	N/A
UK Independence Party	0	0.0%	0	0 / 101	111	0.0%	-7.9%
The Common Good	0	0.0%	0	0 / 101	72	0.0%	N/A

== Council Composition ==
=== Prior to the election ===
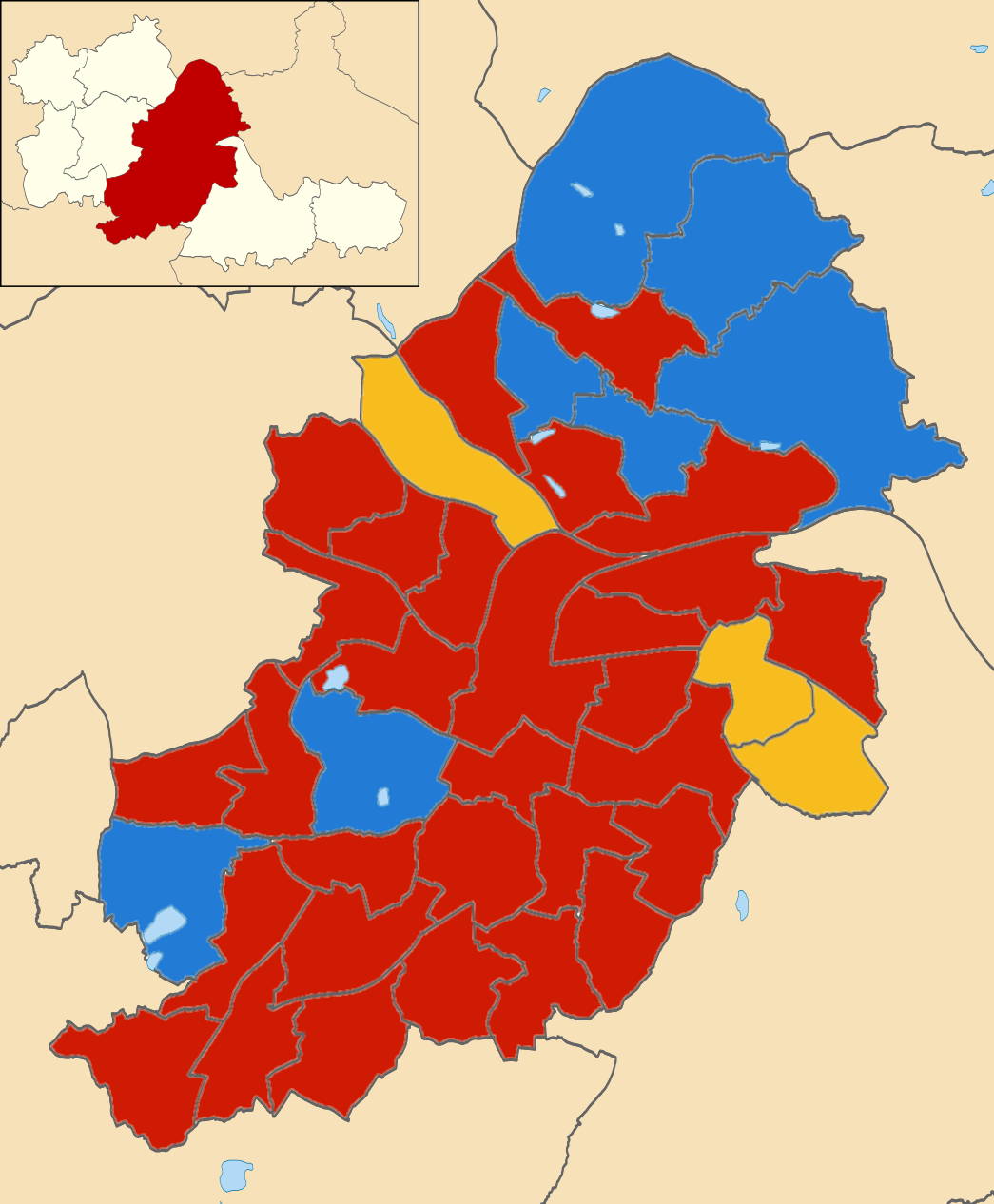
2016 local election results in Birmingham

Prior to the 2018 election, Birmingham City Council was composed of 120 councillors across 40 wards. The council has been controlled by the Labour Party since 2012, which held two-thirds (80) of the seats. The Conservative Party last held sole control of the council in 1984. It was under no overall control from 2003 until 2012, run by a Labour-Liberal Democrat coalition from 2003 to 2004 and by a Conservative-Liberal Democrat coalition from 2004 to 2012.

== Ward results ==
=== City centre and surrounding area ===
==== Aston ====
Aston 2018 (2)
Party	Candidate	Votes	%	±%
Labour	Muhammad Afzal	2,902	46.3	
Labour	Nagina Kauser	2,793	44.6	
Liberal Democrats	Ayoub Khan	2,252	35.9	
Liberal Democrats	Sham Uddin	1,546	24.7	
Independent	Abdul Aziz	1,134	18.1	
Conservative	Jahid Choudhury	891	14.2	
Conservative	Margaret Bennett	328	5.2	
Green	Vijay Rana	160	2.6	
Majority		541		
Turnout		6,266	44.06	
Labour win (new seat)				
Labour win (new seat)				

==== Birchfield ====
Birchfield 2018 (1)
Party	Candidate	Votes	%	±%
Labour	Mahmood Hussain	1,905	83.66	
Conservative	Raja Khan	217	9.53	
Liberal Democrats	Rezaul Billah	155	6.81	
Majority		1,688	74.13	
Turnout		2,277	33.08	
Rejected ballots		15		
Labour win (new seat)				

==== Bordesley & Highgate ====
Bordesley & Highgate 2018 (1)
Party	Candidate	Votes	%	±%
Labour	Yvonne Mosquito	1,176	78.45	
Liberal Democrats	Rezaul Billah	120	8.00	
Conservative	Raja Khan	113	7.54	
Green	Tom Jenkins	90	6.00	
Majority		1,056	70.45	
Turnout		1,499	21.87	
Rejected ballots		13		
Labour win (new seat)				

==== Bordesley Green ====
Bordesley Green 2018 (1)
Party	Candidate	Votes	%	±%
Labour	Chauhdry Rashid	1,664	69.42	
Liberal Democrats	Mohammed Saeed	540	22.53	
Conservative	Ayan Tifow	109	4.55	
Green	Alan Clawley	84	3.50	
Majority		1,124	46.89	
Turnout		2,397	34.06	
Rejected ballots		23		
Labour win (new seat)				

==== Edgbaston ====
Edgbaston 2018 (2)
Party	Candidate	Votes	%	±%
Conservative	Deirdre Alden	2,067	50.4	
Conservative	Matt Bennett	1,969	48.0	
Labour	Jenny Nolan	1,571	38.3	
Labour	Marcus Bernasconi	1,470	35.8	
Green	Alexander Nettle	279	6.8	
Liberal Democrats	Daniel Chamberlain	259	6.3	
Liberal Democrats	Jamie Scott	222	5.4	
Majority		398		
Turnout		4,104		
Conservative win (new seat)				
Conservative win (new seat)				

==== Handsworth ====
Handsworth 2018 (1)
Party	Candidate	Votes	%	±%
Labour	Hendrina Quinnen	1,726	71.7	
Conservative	Enam-Ur Rahman	455	18.9	
Green	Susan Green	146	6.1	
Liberal Democrats	Kingsley Douglas	80	3.3	
Majority		1,271		
Turnout		2,417		
Labour win (new seat)				

==== Handsworth Wood ====
Handsworth Wood 2018 (2)
Party	Candidate	Votes	%	±%
Labour	Narinder Kooner	2,606	62.8	
Labour	Gurdial Atwal	2,509	60.5	
Conservative	Steve White	693	16.7	
Conservative	Ravi Chumber	679	16.4	
Green	Eric Fairclough	283	6.8	
Liberal Democrats	Nicholas Joliffe	245	5.9	
Liberal Democrats	Rizwan Ali	200	4.8	
TUSC	Rachel Jenkins	134	3.2	
Independent	PG Aathouli-Singh	64	1.5	
Majority		1,816		
Turnout		4,150		
Labour win (new seat)				
Labour win (new seat)				

==== Harborne ====
Harborne 2018 (2)
Party	Candidate	Votes	%	±%
Labour	Jayne Francis	2,623	42.9	
Conservative	Peter Fowler	2,533	41.5	
Conservative	Akaal Sidhu	2,390	39.1	
Labour	Sundip Meghani	2,061	33.7	
Liberal Democrats	Colin Green	657	10.8	
Green	Phil Simpson	650	10.6	
Liberal Democrats	Ian Garrett	646	10.6	
Majority		143		
Turnout		6,109		
Labour win (new seat)				
Conservative win (new seat)				

==== Holyhead ====
Holyhead 2018 (1)
Party	Candidate	Votes	%	±%
Labour	Paulette Hamilton	1,646	70.4	
Conservative	Mujakkir Ahmed	436	18.6	
Liberal Democrats	Foysol Ahmed	257	11.0	
Majority		1,210		
Turnout		2,366		
Labour win (new seat)				

==== Ladywood ====
Ladywood 2018 (2)
Party	Candidate	Votes	%	±%
Labour	Kath Hartley	1,639	60.0	
Labour	Albert Bore	1,631	59.7	
Conservative	Kenneth Morris	489	17.9	
Conservative	Nayaz Qazi	388	14.2	
Green	Robert Jones	342	12.5	
Liberal Democrats	Lee Dargue	340	12.4	
Liberal Democrats	Stephen Lambert	278	10.2	
Majority		1,142		
Turnout		2,732		
Labour win (new seat)				
Labour win (new seat)				

==== Lozells ====
Lozells 2018 (1)
Party	Candidate	Votes	%	±%
Labour	Waseem Zaffer	2,071	64.5	
Conservative	Abdul Khalique	745	23.2	
Liberal Democrats	Sadek Hussain	395	12.3	
Majority		1,326		
Turnout		3211		
Labour win (new seat)				

==== Nechells ====
Nechells 2018 (1)
Party	Candidate	Votes	%	±%
Labour	Tahir Ali	1,237	81.2	
Conservative	Neil Shastri-Hurst	164	10.8	
Liberal Democrats	Shazad Iqbal	123	8.1	
Majority		1,073		
Turnout		1,542		
Labour win (new seat)				

==== Newtown ====
Newtown 2018 (1)
Party	Candidate	Votes	%	±%
Labour	Ziaul Islam	1,319	77.4	
Conservative	Desmond Jaddoo	310	18.2	
Liberal Democrats	Sultan Ahmed	76	4.5	
Majority		1,009		
Turnout		1,722		
Labour win (new seat)				

==== North Edgbaston ====
North Edgbaston 2018 (2)
Party	Candidate	Votes	%	±%
Labour	Carl Rice	2,854	70.5	
Labour	Sharon Thompson	2,383	58.8	
Conservative	Dal Sidhu	1,254	31.0	
Conservative	Raj Padda	962	23.4	
Liberal Democrats	Joni Hood	241	5.9	
Independent	Gino Bellavia	227	5.6	
Liberal Democrats	Ned Hilton	180	4.4	
Majority				
Turnout		8,101	32.38	
Labour win (new seat)				
Labour win (new seat)				

==== Quinton ====
Quinton 2018 (2)
Party	Candidate	Votes	%	±%
Labour Co-op	Kate Booth	2,332	45.7	
Labour Co-op	John Clancy	2,307	45.2	
Conservative	Georgina Chandler	2,206	43.3	
Conservative	Rachel Okello	1,919	37.6	
Green	James Bolton	344	6.7	
Liberal Democrats	Julia Garrett	343	6.7	
Liberal Democrats	Jo Walker	146	2.9	
Majority		101		
Turnout		5,100		
Labour Co-op win (new seat)				
Labour Co-op win (new seat)				

==== Soho & Jewellery Quarter ====
Soho & Jewellery Quarter 2018 (2)
Party	Candidate	Votes	%	±%
Labour	Chaman Lal	2,365	62.2	
Labour	Sybil Spence	2,097	55.1	
Conservative	Janatul Choudhury	644	16.9	
Liberal Democrats	Gareth Hardy	566	14.9	
Conservative	Mohammed Islam	460	12.1	
Liberal Democrats	Richard Maxwell	373	9.8	
Green	Kefentse Dennis	272	7.1	
Majority		1,453		
Turnout		3,805		
Labour win (new seat)				
Labour win (new seat)				

=== East of city centre ===
==== Alum Rock ====
Alum Rock 2018 (2)
Party	Candidate	Votes	%	±%
Labour	Mohammed Idrees	4,910	85.3	
Labour	Mariam Khan	4,464	77.6	
Liberal Democrats	Thomas Lister	296	5.1	
Conservative	Richard Brookes-Bland	215	3.7	
Conservative	Amil Khan	214	3.7	
Liberal Democrats	Colin Ross	187	3.2	
Majority		4,168		
Turnout		5,755		
Labour win (new seat)				
Labour win (new seat)				

==== Bromford & Hodge Hill ====
Bromford & Hodge Hill 2018 (2)
Party	Candidate	Votes	%	±%
Labour	Majid Mahmood	2,569	65.4	
Labour	Diane Donaldson	2,435	61.9	
Conservative	Aminur Rahman	721	18.3	
Conservative	Bogdan Tudor	617	15.7	
Liberal Democrats	Gwyn Neilly	424	10.8	
Liberal Democrats	Asad Mehmood	254	6.5	
Majority		1,714		
Turnout		3,931		
Labour win (new seat)				
Labour win (new seat)				

==== Garretts Green ====
Garretts Green 2018 (1)
Party	Candidate	Votes	%	±%
Labour	Saddak Miah	961	49.6	
Liberal Democrats	Carol Jones	824	42.6	
Conservative	Simon Conn	151	7.8	
Majority		137		
Turnout		1,940		
Labour win (new seat)				

==== Glebe Farm & Tile Cross ====
Glebe Farm & Tile Cross 2018 (2)
Party	Candidate	Votes	%	±%
Labour	Marje Bridle	2,302	67.9	
Labour	John Cotton	2,102	62.0	
Conservative	Rosemary Gasson	518	15.3	
Conservative	Fergus Robinson	456	13.5	
Independent	Paul Clayton	366	10.8	
Liberal Democrats	Rafiqur Rahman	256	7.6	
Liberal Democrats	Shamsur Rehman	244	7.2	
Majority		1,584		
Turnout		3,388		
Labour win (new seat)				
Labour win (new seat)				

==== Heartlands ====
Heartlands 2018 (1)
Party	Candidate	Votes	%	±%
Labour	Shafique Shah	2,136	78.9	
Independent	Aftab Hussain	234	8.6	
Liberal Democrats	Faisal Mahmood	166	6.1	
Conservative	Mary Storer	111	4.1	
Green	Janet Assheton	59	2.2	
Majority		1,902		
Turnout		2,728		
Labour win (new seat)				

==== Shard End ====
Shard End 2018 (1)
Party	Candidate	Votes	%	±%
Labour	Ian Ward	911	60.8	
Conservative	John Alden	371	24.8	
Liberal Democrats	Christopher Barber	66	4.4	
Green	Mike Harrison	61	4.1	
Independent	James Scroggie	61	4.1	
TUSC	Mark Andrews	28	1.9	
Majority		540		
Turnout		1,506		
Labour win (new seat)				

==== Sheldon ====
Sheldon 2018 (2)
Party	Candidate	Votes	%	±%
Liberal Democrats	Paul Tilsley	2,565	62.2	
Liberal Democrats	Mike Ward	2,342	56.8	
Labour	Bob Collins	900	21.8	
Labour	Julia Larden	880	21.3	
Conservative	Nicholas Psirides	474	11.5	
Conservative	Suhel Ali	452	11.0	
Green	Kevin Harrison	131	3.2	
Majority		1,442		
Turnout		4,126		
Liberal Democrats win (new seat)				
Liberal Democrats win (new seat)				

==== Small Heath ====
Small Heath 2018 (2)
Party	Candidate	Votes	%	±%
Labour	Zaheer Khan	3,270	55.4	
Labour	Safia Akhtar	3,196	54.2	
Liberal Democrats	Shaukat Khan	1,738	29.5	
Liberal Democrats	Gerry Moynihan	1,017	17.2	
Conservative	Kabir Uddin	655	11.1	
Independent	Shaaky Ahmed	604	10.2	
Conservative	Pervez Akhtar	547	9.3	
Green	Hazel Clawley	149	2.5	
Majority		1,458		
Turnout		5,900		
Labour win (new seat)				
Labour win (new seat)				

==== South Yardley ====
South Yardley 2018 (1)
Party	Candidate	Votes	%	±%
Liberal Democrats	Zaker Choudhry	1,507	60.4	
Labour	David Welburn	601	24.1	
Conservative	Susan Axford	344	13.8	
Green	Christopher Garghan	43	1.7	
Majority		906		
Turnout		2,504		
Liberal Democrats win (new seat)				

==== Ward End ====
Ward End 2018 (1)
Party	Candidate	Votes	%	±%
Labour	Mohammed Aikhlaq	1,663	54.2	
Liberal Democrats	Nazabit Ali	909	29.6	
Independent	Wajid Hussain	331	10.8	
Conservative	Joseph Hamblin	166	5.4	
Majority		754		
Turnout		3,069		
Labour win (new seat)				

==== Yardley East ====
Yardley East 2018 (1)
Party	Candidate	Votes	%	±%
Liberal Democrats	Neil Eustace	1,856	64.9	
Labour	Ann Wackett	863	30.2	
Conservative	Edwin Caldecott	140	4.9	
Majority		993		
Turnout		2,869		
Liberal Democrats win (new seat)				

==== Yardley West & Stechford ====
Yardley West & Stechford 2018 (1)
Party	Candidate	Votes	%	±%
Liberal Democrats	Baber Baz	1,505	51.5	
Labour	Basharat Dad	1,285	43.9	
Conservative	Ali Mothin	133	4.6	
Majority		220		
Turnout		2,923		
Liberal Democrats win (new seat)				

=== North of city centre ===
==== Castle Vale ====
Castle Vale 2018 (1)
Party	Candidate	Votes	%	±%
Conservative	Suzanne Webb	731	50.8	
Labour	Lynda Clinton	640	44.4	
Liberal Democrats	Trevor Holtom	35	2.4	
TUSC	Kris Sucilla O'Sullivan	34	2.4	
Majority		91		
Turnout		1,445		
Conservative win (new seat)				

==== Erdington ====
Erdington 2018 (2)
Party	Candidate	Votes	%	±%
Conservative	Robert Alden	2,727	56.1	
Conservative	Gareth Moore	2,456	50.5	
Labour Co-op	Vic Hooper	1,837	37.8	
Labour Co-op	Dee Smyth	1,666	34.3	
Green	Rebecca Collins	259	5.3	
Liberal Democrats	Callum Reilly	132	2.7	
Liberal Democrats	Thomas Hunt	126	2.6	
Majority		619		
Turnout		4,859		
Conservative win (new seat)				
Conservative win (new seat)				

==== Gravelly Hill ====
Gravelly Hill 2018 (1)
Party	Candidate	Votes	%	±%
Labour	Mick Brown	1,238	74.2	
Conservative	Luqmaan Nawaz	297	17.8	
Liberal Democrats	Philip Mills	133	8.0	
Majority		941		
Turnout		1,668		
Labour win (new seat)				

==== Kingstanding ====
Kingstanding 2018 (2)
Party	Candidate	Votes	%	±%
Conservative	Gary Sambrook	1,745	52.4	
Conservative	Ron Storer	1,577	47.4	
Labour	Des Hughes	1,465	44.0	
Labour	Jane Jones	1,459	43.9	
Liberal Democrats	Violaine Mendez	97	2.9	
Liberal Democrats	James Perrott	89	2.7	
Majority		122		
Turnout		3,327		
Conservative win (new seat)				
Conservative win (new seat)				

==== Oscott ====
Oscott 2018 (2)
Party	Candidate	Votes	%	±%
Labour	Keith Linnecor	1,794	50.7	
Labour	Barbara Dring	1,705	48.2	
Conservative	Tom Coffey	1,407	39.7	
Conservative	Leona Leung	1,245	35.2	
Liberal Democrats	Andy Fullylove	147	4.2	
Green	Harry Eyles	132	3.7	
Liberal Democrats	Marcia Hunt	131	3.7	
Majority		298		
Turnout		3,540		
Labour win (new seat)				
Labour win (new seat)				

==== Perry Barr ====
Perry Barr 2018 (2)
Party	Candidate	Votes	%	±%
Liberal Democrats	Jon Hunt	2,957	58.1	
Liberal Democrats	Morriam Jan	2,398	47.1	
Labour	Mohammed Hanif	1,887	37.1	
Labour	Sukhi Kaur	1,662	32.6	
Conservative	Janet Coffey	361	7.1	
Conservative	Tariq Rashid	190	3.7	
TUSC	Corinthia Ward	78	1.5	
Majority		511		
Turnout		5,093		
Liberal Democrats win (new seat)				
Liberal Democrats win (new seat)				

==== Perry Common ====
Perry Common 2018 (1)
Party	Candidate	Votes	%	±%
Conservative	Bob Beauchamp	1,007	49.2	
Labour Co-op	Anita Ward	955	46.7	
Liberal Democrats	Stephen Allsopp	84	4.1	
Majority		52		
Turnout		2,056		
Conservative win (new seat)				

==== Pype Hayes ====
Pype Hayes 2018 (1)
Party	Candidate	Votes	%	±%
Labour	Mike Sharpe	851	45.9	
Conservative	Clifton Welch	835	45.1	
Liberal Democrats	Ann Holtom	109	5.9	
Green	John Bentley	58	3.1	
Majority		16		
Turnout		1,856		
Labour win (new seat)				

==== Stockland Green ====
Stockland Green 2018 (2)
Party	Candidate	Votes	%	±%
Labour	Penny Holbrook	2,536	68.0	
Labour	Josh Jones	2,259	60.6	
Conservative	Mohammad Kayani	726	19.5	
Conservative	Asif Mehmood	686	18.4	
Liberal Democrats	Joe Harmer	238	6.4	
Liberal Democrats	Rizwan Syed	149	4.0	
TUSC	Ted Woodley	127	3.4	
Majority		1,533		
Turnout		3,728		
Labour win (new seat)				
Labour win (new seat)				

=== South-east of city centre ===
==== Acocks Green ====
Acocks Green 2018 (2)
Party	Candidate	Votes	%	±%
Labour	John O'Shea	2,249	48.0	
Liberal Democrats	Roger Harmer	1,857	39.7	
Liberal Democrats	Penny Wagg	1,737	37.1	
Labour	Fiona Williams	1,521	32.5	
Conservative	Wajad Ali	525	11.2	
Conservative	Luke Watson	329	7.0	
Green	Amanda Baker	201	4.3	
TUSC	Eamonn Flynn	71	1.5	
Majority		120		
Turnout		4,683	29.22	
Labour win (new seat)				
Liberal Democrats win (new seat)				

==== Balsall Heath West ====
Balsall Heath West 2018 (1)
Party	Candidate	Votes	%	±%
Labour	Zhor Malik	1,938	76.4	
Liberal Democrats	Islam Issa	204	8.0	
Birmingham Worker	Sammi Ibrahem	156	6.2	
Conservative	Ali Fazel	139	5.5	
Green	Martin Guest	98	3.9	
Majority		1,734		
Turnout		2,570		
Labour win (new seat)				

==== Brandwood & King's Heath ====
Brandwood & King's Heath 2018 (2)
Party	Candidate	Votes	%	±%
Labour	Lisa Trickett	3,395	59.4	
Labour	Mike Leddy	3,350	58.6	
Conservative	Gordon Franks	1,122	19.6	
Conservative	Joshua Mackenzie-Lawrie	829	14.5	
Green	Patrick Cox	658	11.5	
Liberal Democrats	Chris Burgess	479	8.4	
Green	Julie Kaya	392	6.9	
Liberal Democrats	Rob Gilliam	293	5.1	
Birmingham Worker	Katherine Cremer	95	1.7	
TUSC	Bill Murray	78	1.4	
Majority		2,228	39	
Turnout		5,713		
Labour win (new seat)				
Labour win (new seat)				

==== Druids Heath and Monyhull ====
Druids Heath & Monyhull 2018 (1)
Party	Candidate	Votes	%	±%
Green	Julien Pritchard	1,201	45.4	
Labour	Victoria Quinn	725	27.4	
Conservative	Ben Brittain	688	26.0	
Liberal Democrats	Emily Cox	27	1.0	
Majority		476		
Turnout		2,646		
Green win (new seat)				

==== Hall Green North ====
Hall Green North 2018 (2)
Party	Candidate	Votes	%	±%
Labour	Akhlaq Ahmed	2,989	58.6	
Labour	Lou Robson	2,922	57.3	
Independent	Bob Harvey	1,098	21.5	
Conservative	Sohan Singh	687	13.5	
Conservative	Tukeer Hussain	529	10.4	
Liberal Democrats	Andy Spruce	386	7.6	
Liberal Democrats	Stephanie Spruce	345	6.8	
Green	Gareth Courage	341	6.7	
Majority		1,824		
Turnout		5,102		
Labour win (new seat)				
Labour win (new seat)				

==== Hall Green South ====
Hall Green South 2018 (1)
Party	Candidate	Votes	%	±%
Conservative	Tim Huxtable	1,744	60.0	
Labour Co-op	Changese Khan	855	30.4	
Liberal Democrats	Jerry Evans	154	5.3	
Green	Ulla Grant	124	4.3	
Majority		889		
Turnout		2,916		
Conservative win (new seat)				

==== Highter's Heath ====
Highter's Heath 2018 (1)
Party	Candidate	Votes	%	±%
Conservative	Adam Higgs	1,362	61.7	
Labour	Barry Bowles	709	32.1	
Green	Clare Thomas	79	3.6	
Liberal Democrats	Kirsty Jerome	57	2.6	
Majority		653		
Turnout		2,213		
Conservative win (new seat)				

==== Moseley ====
Moseley 2018 (2)
Party	Candidate	Votes	%	±%
Labour	Kerry Jenkins	3,123	50.2	
Labour	Martin Straker-Welds	3,114	50.0	
Liberal Democrats	Izzy Knowles	2,211	35.5	
Liberal Democrats	David Farrow	1,494	24.0	
Green	Rachel Xerri-Brooks	608	9.8	
Conservative	John Turner	579	9.3	
Conservative	Dominic O'Callaghan	547	8.8	
Majority		6,225		
Turnout		903		
Labour win (new seat)				
Labour win (new seat)				

==== Sparkbrook & Balsall Heath East ====
Sparkbrook & Balsall Heath East 2018 (2)
Party	Candidate	Votes	%	±%
Labour	Mohammed Azim	4,257	77.2	
Labour	Shabrana Hussain	3,950	71.6	
Conservative	Abu Nowshed	701	12.7	
Conservative	Mohammad Sweet	665	12.1	
Green	Roxanne Green	237	4.3	
Liberal Democrats	Joynal Abedin	201	3.6	
Liberal Democrats	Satwinder Singh	159	2.9	
Majority		3,249		
Turnout		5,517		
Labour win (new seat)				
Labour win (new seat)				

==== Sparkhill ====
Sparkhill 2018 (2)
Party	Candidate	Votes	%	±%
Labour	Mohammed Fazal	3,140	61.6	
Labour	Nicky Brennan	2,971	58.3	
Liberal Democrats	Tanveer Choudhry	1,295	25.4	
Liberal Democrats	Tassawer Hussain	1,178	23.1	
Conservative	Murad Mohammed	453	8.9	
Conservative	Mohammed Talukder	440	8.6	
Majority		1,676		
Turnout		5,098		
Labour win (new seat)				
Labour win (new seat)				

==== Tyseley & Hay Mills ====
Tyseley & Hay Mills 2018 (1)
Party	Candidate	Votes	%	±%
Labour	Zafar Iqbal	1,361	66.6	
Liberal Democrats	Syed Ali	306	15.0	
Conservative	Shafayet Khan	208	10.2	
Liberal	Mike Sheridan	170	8.3	
Majority		1,055		
Turnout		2,045		
Labour win (new seat)				

=== South-west of city centre ===
==== Allens Cross ====
Allens Cross 2018 (1)
Party	Candidate	Votes	%	±%
Conservative	Eddie Freeman	1,023	46.84	
Labour Co-op	Steve Bedser	974	44.60	
Common Good	Dick Rodgers	72	3.30	
Liberal Democrats	Clare Fielden	63	2.88	
Green	Peter Beck	52	2.38	
Majority		49	2.24	
Turnout		2,184	29.03	
Rejected ballots		5		
Conservative win (new seat)				

==== Bartley Green ====
Bartley Green 2018 (2)
Party	Candidate	Votes	%	±%
Conservative	Bruce Lines	2,627	61.8	
Conservative	John Lines	2,626	61.8	
Labour	Paul Preston	1,296	30.5	
Labour	Joanne Shemmans	1,197	28.2	
Green	James Robertson	188	4.4	
Liberal Democrats	David Osborne	113	2.7	
Liberal Democrats	Maureen Osborne	110	2.6	
Majority		1,330		
Turnout		4,252	27.14	
Conservative hold		Swing		
Conservative hold		Swing		

==== Billesley ====
Billesley 2018 (2)
Party	Candidate	Votes	%	±%
Labour	Phil Davis	2,537	50.5	▼1.7
Labour	Lucy Seymour-Smith	2,309	46.0	
Conservative	Tom Huxley	2,037	40.6	
Conservative	Jane James	2,035	40.5	
Green	Robert Grant	232	4.6	
Liberal Democrats	Alan Morrow	220	4.4	▲0.8
Green	David Gaussen	139	2.8	
Liberal Democrats	Phil Wagg	110	2.2	
Majority		272	5.6	
Turnout		5,022		
Labour hold		Swing		
Labour hold		Swing		

==== Bournbrook & Selly Park ====
Bournbrook & Selly Park 2018 (2)
Party	Candidate	Votes	%	±%
Labour Co-op	Brigid Jones	1,884	61.3	
Labour Co-op	Karen McCarthy	1,773	57.7	
Liberal Democrats	Jake Calcutt	476	15.5	
Conservative	Monica Hardie	423	13.8	
Liberal Democrats	Sophie Thornton	413	13.4	
Conservative	Angus Gillan	411	13.4	
Green	Alice Kiff	266	8.7	
Green	Benjamin Mabbett	123	4.0	
TUSC	Sam Witts	82	2.7	
Majority		1,297	42.2	
Turnout		3,074		
Labour Co-op win (new seat)				
Labour Co-op win (new seat)				

==== Bournville & Cotteridge ====
Bournville & Cotteridge 2018 (2)
Party	Candidate	Votes	%	±%
Labour	Liz Clements	2,809	51.3	
Labour	Fred Grindrod	2,505	45.7	
Conservative	Rob Sealey	2,065	37.7	
Conservative	Peter Douglas Osborn	1,899	34.7	
Green	Anna Masters	410	7.5	
Green	Claire Hammond	371	6.8	
Liberal Democrats	Dave Radcliffe	284	5.2	
Liberal Democrats	Tim Stimpson	194	3.5	
TUSC	Clive Walder	41	0.7	
Majority		440	8.0	
Turnout		5,476		
Labour win (new seat)				
Labour win (new seat)				

==== Frankley Great Park ====
Frankley Great Park 2018 (1)
Party	Candidate	Votes	%	±%
Conservative	Simon Morrall	1,019	50.9	
Labour	Andrew Cartwright	904	45.2	
Liberal Democrats	Gerry Jerome	78	3.9	
Majority		115	5.7	
Turnout		2,012		
Conservative win (new seat)				

==== King's Norton North ====
King's Norton North 2018 (1)
Party	Candidate	Votes	%	±%
Labour	Alex Aitken	1,341	50.2	
Conservative	Simon Jevon	1,237	46.3	
Liberal Democrats	Brian Peace	95	3.6	
Majority		104	3.9	
Turnout		2,694		
Labour win (new seat)				

==== King's Norton South ====
King's Norton South 2018 (1)
Party	Candidate	Votes	%	±%
Labour	Peter Griffiths	1,015	51.52	
Conservative	Barbara Wood	843	42.79	
Liberal Democrats	Peter Lloyd	106	5.38	
Majority		172	8.73	
Turnout		1,970	25.28	
Rejected ballots		6		
Labour win (new seat)				

==== Longbridge & West Heath ====
Longbridge & West Heath 2018 (2)
Party	Candidate	Votes	%	±%
Conservative	Debbie Clancy	2,174	49.7	
Labour	Brett O'Reilly	1,925	44.0	
Conservative	Graham Knight	1,911	43.7	
Labour	Carmel Corrigan	1,863	42.6	
Green	Susan Pearce	290	6.6	
Liberal Democrats	Hugh Duffy	101	2.3	
Liberal Democrats	Jim Whorwood	89	2.0	
Majority		14	0.3	
Turnout		4,376		
Conservative win (new seat)				
Labour win (new seat)				

==== Northfield ====
Northfield 2018 (1)
Party	Candidate	Votes	%	±%
Labour	Olly Armstrong	1,635	53.5	
Conservative	Randal Brew	1,257	41.1	
Green	Margaret Okole	84	2.7	
Liberal Democrats	Andy Moles	81	2.6	
Majority		378	12.4	
Turnout		3064		
Labour win (new seat)				

==== Rubery & Rednal ====
Rubery & Rednal 2018 (1)
Party	Candidate	Votes	%	±%
Conservative	Adrian Delaney	969	53.4	
Labour	Carole Griffiths	706	38.9	
Green	Rob Ball	89	4.9	
Liberal Democrats	Kevin Hannon	52	2.9	
Majority		263	14.5	
Turnout		1,819		
Conservative win (new seat)				

==== Stirchley ====
Stirchley 2018 (1)
Party	Candidate	Votes	%	±%
Labour Co-op	Mary Locke	1,856	66.8	
Conservative	Owen Williams	576	20.7	
Green	Elly Stanton	155	5.6	
Liberal Democrats	Phil Banting	141	5.1	
Birmingham Worker	Reuben Lawrence	45	1.6	
Majority		1,280	46.1	
Turnout		2,780		
Labour Co-op win (new seat)				

==== Weoley & Selly Oak ====
Weoley & Selly Oak 2018 (2)
Party	Candidate	Votes	%	±%
Labour	Julie Johnson	2,080	43.9	
Labour	Tristan Chatfield	2,035	43.0	
Conservative	Andrew Hardie	1,885	39.8	
Conservative	Des Flood	1,875	39.6	
Green	Eleanor Masters	410	8.7	
Liberal Democrats	Trevor Sword	329	6.9	
Liberal Democrats	Robert Wright	274	5.8	
TUSC	Nick Hart	77	1.6	
Majority		150	3.2	
Turnout		4,734		
Labour win (new seat)				
Labour win (new seat)				

=== Sutton Coldfield ===
==== Sutton Four Oaks ====
Sutton Four Oaks 2018 (1)
Party	Candidate	Votes	%	±%
Conservative	Maureen Cornish	1,957	77.1	
Labour	Roger Barley	340	13.4	
Liberal Democrats	David Willett	141	5.6	
Green	Fiona Nunan	100	3.9	
Majority		1,617	63.7	
Turnout		2,558		
Conservative hold		Swing		

==== Sutton Mere Green ====
Sutton Mere Green 2018 (1)
Party	Candidate	Votes	%	±%
Conservative	Meirion Jenkins	2,062	71.8	
Labour	Ian Brindley	462	16.1	
Liberal Democrats	Jonny Mayner	194	6.8	
Green	David Ratcliff	153	5.3	
Majority		1,600	55.7	
Turnout		2,890		
Conservative win (new seat)				

==== Sutton Reddicap ====
Sutton Reddicap 2018 (1)
Party	Candidate	Votes	%	±%
Conservative	Charlotte Hodivala	1,008	56.7	
Labour	Judy Preston	537	30.2	
Liberal Democrats	Tim Cotterill	121	6.8	
UKIP	Stewart Cotterill	111	6.2	
Majority		471	26.5	
Turnout		1,794		
Conservative win (new seat)				

==== Sutton Roughley ====
Sutton Roughley 2018 (1)
Party	Candidate	Votes	%	±%
Conservative	Ewan Mackey	1,809	67.4	
Labour	Paul Tomlinson	521	19.4	
Liberal Democrats	Kate Potter	215	8.0	
Green	Will Greaves	140	5.2	
Majority		1,288	48.0	
Turnout		2,695		
Conservative win (new seat)				

==== Sutton Trinity ====
Sutton Trinity 2018 (1)
Party	Candidate	Votes	%	±%
Conservative	David Pears	1,355	57.1	
Labour	Peter French	593	25.0	
Liberal Democrats	Jenny Wilkinson	299	12.6	
Green	Sean Madden	124	5.2	
Majority		762	32.1	
Turnout		2,371		
Conservative win (new seat)				

==== Sutton Vesey ====
Sutton Vesey 2018 (2)
Party	Candidate	Votes	%	±%
Labour	Rob Pocock	3,377	56.96	
Labour	Kath Scott	2,458	41.5	
Conservative	Janet Cairns	2,354	39.7	
Conservative	Louise Passey	2,182	36.8	
Green	Colin Marriott	297	5.0	
Liberal Democrats	Matthew Gibson	271	4.6	
Liberal Democrats	Mohammed Khalid	110	1.9	
Majority		104	1.8	
Turnout		5,929		
Labour win (new seat)				
Labour win (new seat)				

==== Sutton Walmley & Minworth ====
Sutton Walmley & Minworth 2018 (2)
Party	Candidate	Votes	%	±%
Conservative	David Barrie	2,445	65.0	
Conservative	Ken Wood	1,869	49.7	
Labour	Katy Coxall	696	18.5	
Independent	David O’Hagan	646	17.2	
Labour	Paul Finnegan	574	15.2	
Green	Ben Auton	336	8.9	
Liberal Democrats	David Cooke	236	6.3	
Liberal Democrats	James Garrington	179	4.8	
Majority		1,173	31.1	
Turnout		3,764		
Conservative win (new seat)				
Conservative win (new seat)				

==== Sutton Wylde Green ====
Sutton Wylde Green 2018 (1)
Party	Candidate	Votes	%	±%
Conservative	Alex Yip	1,806	65.13	
Labour	Terry Johnson	644	23.22	
Liberal Democrats	Malcolm Spencer	162	5.84	
Green	Zoe Challenor	142	5.12	
Majority		1,162	41.90	
Turnout		2,773	37.63	
Rejected ballots		19		
Conservative win (new seat)				

== By-elections ==
=== Billesley ===
Billesley: 6 May 2021
Party	Candidate	Votes	%	±%
Labour	Katherine Carlisle	2,553	54.0	+3.5
Conservative	Clair Felton	1,534	32.5	−8.0
Green	Joseph Peacock	252	5.3	+0.7
Independent	Nadia Rashid	107	2.3	N/A
Liberal Democrats	Ian Neal	91	1.9	−2.5
Independent	James Dalton	64	1.4	N/A
Freedom Alliance	John Goss	49	1.0	N/A
Reform	Ian Bishop	42	0.9	N/A
TUSC	Abdul Haq	34	0.7	N/A
Majority		1,019	21.5	
Turnout		4,726		
Labour hold		Swing	▲5.8	

=== Hall Green North ===
Hall Green North: 6 May 2021
Party	Candidate	Votes	%	±%
Labour	Saima Suleman	2,542	53.7	−0.6
Independent	Bob Harvey	833	17.6	−2.4
Conservative	Pranav Gupta	819	17.3	+3.8
Green	Chris Garghan	246	5.2	−1.0
Liberal Democrats	Andy Spruce	242	5.1	−1.9
TUSC	Eamonn Flynn	55	1.2	N/A
Majority		1,709	36.1	
Turnout		4,737		
Labour hold		Swing	▲0.9	

=== Oscott ===
Oscott: 6 May 2021
Party	Candidate	Votes	%	±%
Conservative	Darius Sandhu	1,981	54.4	+14.0
Labour	Uzma Ahmed	1,086	29.8	−21.8
Liberal Democrats	Joshua Bunting	238	6.5	+2.3
Green	Benjamin Craddock	165	4.5	+0.7
Independent	Graham Green	112	3.1	N/A
TUSC	Ted Woodley	58	1.6	N/A
Majority		895	24.6	
Turnout		3,640		
Conservative gain from Labour		Swing	▲17.9	

=== Quinton ===
Quinton: 6 May 2021
Party	Candidate	Votes	%	±%
Conservative	Dominic Stanford	2,728	48.7	+6.5
Labour	Elaine Kidney	2,344	41.8	−2.8
Green	Peter Beck	323	5.8	−0.8
Liberal Democrats	Stephanie Garrett	182	3.2	−3.4
TUSC	Mia Wroe	27	0.5	N/A
Majority		384	6.9	
Turnout		5,604		
Conservative gain from Labour		Swing	▲4.7	

=== Yardley East ===
Yardley East: 21 October 2021
Party	Candidate	Votes	%	±%
Liberal Democrats	Deborah Harries	1,312	65.3	+0.4
Labour	Carmel Corrigan	609	30.3	+0.1
Conservative	Pervez Akhtar	89	4.4	−0.5
Majority		703	35.0	
Turnout		2,016	25.2	
Liberal Democrats hold		Swing	▲0.2	
