= Edgbaston (ward) =

Coordinates: 52.45°N 1.91°W

- Ward
- Edgbaston Ward shown within Birmingham

- Location within the West Midlands
- Population: 24,426 (2011)
- OS grid reference: SP055845
- Metropolitan borough: Birmingham
- Metropolitan county: West Midlands
- Region: West Midlands
- Country: England
- Sovereign state: United Kingdom
- Post town: BIRMINGHAM
- Postcode district: B15 B16
- Dialling code: 0121
- Police: West Midlands
- Fire: West Midlands
- Ambulance: West Midlands
- UK Parliament: Birmingham Edgbaston
- Councillors: Deirdre Alden (Conservative Party); Matt Bennett (Conservative Party)

Edgbaston ward is a local government district, one of 40 wards that make up Birmingham City Council. Edgbaston lies to the south west of Birmingham city centre and is home to the University of Birmingham and the Queen Elizabeth hospital. The ward population at the 2011 census was 24,426.

== Ward description ==
The ward covers an area of west Birmingham, including the districts of Edgbaston and parts of Ladywood. It also covers areas around the University Hospital.

The ward was created in 1838, and has been a ward ever since.

The boundary changes of 1950, transferred an area east of the railway line and north of Church Rd and Priory Rd, was transferred to Market Hall ward. To compensate for the loss of electorate, the ward was extended westwards to take in areas of north Harborne.

The boundary changes of 1962 were a reverse of the 1950 changes. The areas south of Lea Bank and Belgrave Roads from the Market Hall ward. Once again to balance the electorate, the area north of the Hagley Road close to the city boundary at Bearwood, and the area of northern Harborne which had been acquired in 1950 were transferred to Harborne ward.

== Politics ==
The Edgbaston ward is currently represented by two Conservative Councillors; Deirdre Alden (1999-), and Matt Bennett (2015-).

The ward of Edgbaston forms part of the Parliamentary constituency of Birmingham Edgbaston along with Bartley Green, Harborne, and Quinton, which has been represented by Labour Party MP Preet Gill since 2017.

== Election results ==
=== 2020s ===
5 May 2022
| Party | Candidate | Votes | % | ±% |
|---|---|---|---|---|
| Conservative | Deirdre Alden | 1,710 | 24.1 | |
| Conservative | Matt Bennett | 1,548 | 21.9 | |
| Labour | Baljit Kaur | 1,474 | 20.8 | |
| Labour | Marie Hill | 1,465 | 20.7 | |
| Green | Ashish Awasthi | 392 | 5.5 | |
| Liberal Democrats | Jamie Scott | 251 | 3.5 | |
| Liberal Democrats | James Bryant | 243 | 3.4 | |
| Majority | | | | |
| Turnout | | 7,083 | | |
| Conservative hold | | Swing | | |
| Conservative hold | | Swing | | |

=== 2010s ===
3 May 2018
| Party | Candidate | Votes | % | ±% |
|---|---|---|---|---|
| Conservative | Deirdre Alden | 2,607 | 31.1 | |
| Conservative | Matt Bennett | 1,969 | 23.5 | |
| Labour | Jenny Nolan | 1,571 | 18.8 | |
| Labour | Marcus Bernasconi | 1,470 | 17.6 | |
| Green | Alexander Nettle | 279 | 3.3 | |
| Liberal Democrats | Daniel Chamberlain | 259 | 3.1 | |
| Liberal Democrats | Jamie Scott | 222 | 2.7 | |
| Majority | | | | |
| Turnout | | 8,377 | | |
| Conservative hold | | Swing | | |
| Conservative hold | | Swing | | |

5 May 2016
| Party | Candidate | Votes | % | ±% |
|---|---|---|---|---|
| Conservative | Deirdre Alden | 2,043 | 44.6 | ▲2.1 |
| Labour | Tom Keeley | 1,967 | 42.9 | ▲2.3 |
| Green | Joe Belcher | 222 | 4.8 | ▼3.2 |
| UKIP | Peter Hughes | 180 | 3.9 | ▼0.5 |
| Liberal Democrats | Lee Dargue | 174 | 3.8 | ▼0.7 |
| Majority | | 76 | 1.7 | |
| Turnout | | 4,586 | 32.3 | |
| Conservative hold | | Swing | | |

7 May 2015
| Party | Candidate | Votes | % | ±% |
|---|---|---|---|---|
| Conservative | Matt Bennett | 4,112 | 42.5 | ▲0.8 |
| Labour | Tom Keeley | 3,932 | 40.6 | ▼0.8 |
| Green | Tom Dalton | 777 | 8.0 | ▲1.3 |
| Liberal Democrats | Lee Dargue | 433 | 4.5 | ▼3.1 |
| UKIP | Laura Howard | 426 | 4.4 | ▲2.1 |
| Majority | | 180 | 1.9 | |
| Turnout | | 9,680 | | |
| Conservative hold | | Swing | ▲0.6 | |

22 May 2014
| Party | Candidate | Votes | % | ±% |
|---|---|---|---|---|
| Conservative | Fergus Robinson | 2,235 | | |
| Labour | Robbie Lea-Trengrouse | 2,061 | | |
| UKIP | Keith Rowe | 470 | | |
| Liberal Democrats | Kaneyalal Chudasama | 313 | | |
| Majority | | 174 | | |
| Turnout | | | | |
| Conservative hold | | Swing | | |

3 May 2012
| Party | Candidate | Votes | % | ±% |
|---|---|---|---|---|
| Conservative | Deirdre Alden | 2,240 | 46.1 | |
| Labour | D Minnis | 1999 | 41.1 | |
| Green | B Marle | 279 | 5.7 | |
| Liberal Democrats | Colin Green | 196 | 4.0 | |
| UKIP | D Bridges | 131 | 2.7 | |
| Majority | | 241 | 5.0 | |
| Turnout | | | 26.6 | ▼7.3 |
| Conservative hold | | Swing | | |

5 May 2011
| Party | Candidate | Votes | % | ±% |
|---|---|---|---|---|
| Conservative | James Hutchings | 2,555 | 41.7 | |
| Labour | D Minnis | 2534 | 41.4 | |
| Liberal Democrats | Colin Green | 472 | 7.7 | |
| Green | P Tinsley | 414 | 6.8 | |
| UKIP | G Houston | 145 | 2.4 | |
| Majority | | 21 | 0.3 | |
| Turnout | | | 33.9 | |
| Conservative hold | | Swing | | |

6 May 2010
| Party | Candidate | Votes | % | ±% |
|---|---|---|---|---|
| Conservative | Fergus Robinson | 3,832 | 40.4 | ▼18.4 |
| Labour | N Constantinou | 3,036 | 32.0 | ▲9.9 |
| Liberal Democrats | R Hunter | 2,053 | 21.7 | ▲12.6 |
| Green | E Moss | 378 | 4.0 | |
| BNP | E Wainwright | 181 | 1.9 | |
| Majority | | 796 | 8.4 | |
| Conservative hold | | Swing | | |

=== 2000s ===
1 May 2008
| Party | Candidate | Votes | % | ±% |
|---|---|---|---|---|
| Conservative | Deirdre Alden | 2,429 | 58.8 | |
| Labour | R Dungate | 912 | 22.1 | |
| Liberal Democrats | S Ritchie | 372 | 9.0 | |
| Majority | | 1517 | 36.7 | |
| Conservative hold | | Swing | | |

3 May 2007
| Party | Candidate | Votes | % | ±% |
|---|---|---|---|---|
| Conservative | James Hutchings | 2,410 | 51.9 | |
| Labour | M Clee | 1196 | 25.7 | |
| Liberal Democrats | S Ritchie | 524 | 11.3 | |
| Green | B Smith | 322 | 6.9 | |
| BNP | T Shearer | 121 | 2.6 | |
| UKIP | F Jones | 75 | 1.6 | |
| Majority | | 1214 | 26.1 | |
| Conservative hold | | Swing | | |
