= Paul Tilsley =

British politician

Cllr Paul Tilsley CBE
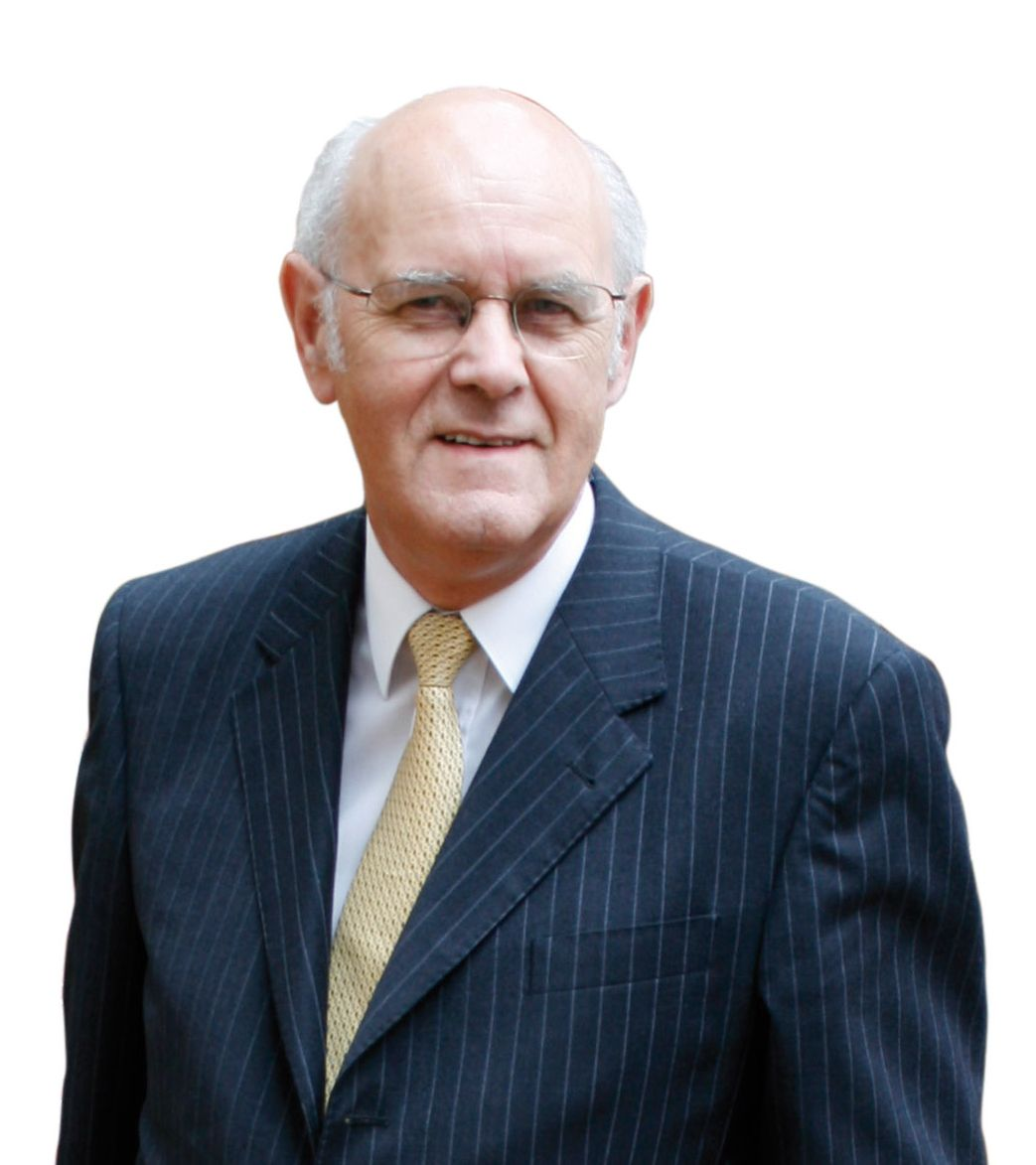
- Paul Tilsley in April 2011

Deputy Leader of Birmingham City Council
- In office 5 May 2005 – 3 May 2012
- Leader: Mike Whitby
- Preceded by: John Hemming
- Succeeded by: Ian Ward

Lord Mayor of Birmingham
- In office 1993–1994
- Preceded by: Peter Barwell
- Succeeded by: Richard Knowles

Member of Birmingham City Council for Sheldon
- Incumbent
- Assumed office May 1988

Member of Birmingham City Council for Aston
- In office May 1968 – May 1982

Deputy Lord Mayor of Birmingham
- In office March 2017 – May 2017

Personal details
- Born: Birmingham
- Party: Liberal Democrats

Paul Tilsley CBE is a British local politician. He was deputy leader of Birmingham City Council and the senior Liberal Democrat in the council's ruling Liberal Democrat–Conservative coalition. As of 2023, he is the council's longest-serving member, and was previously Lord Mayor of Birmingham, in 1993–4.

As a councillor, he represents the ward of Sheldon, and was previously a councillor in Aston ward. He was Chairman of the Birmingham Strategic Partnership from October 2005 until May 2012.

In January 2016, he announced his decision to stand down as leader of the council's Lib Dem group, a position held since June 2005, but to remain a back bencher.

Following the death in March 2017 of Cllr Ray Hassall, who was Deputy Lord Mayor, Tilsley was elected by the Council to complete his term of office.

== Biography ==
He was responsible for placing Birmingham as one of the UK's leading cities on the Sustainability and Environmental Agenda, speaking at a number of Conferences both in the UK and in Europe on this issue.

From May 2005 until May 2012 he was Chairman of Digital Birmingham which brought together both public and private sector partners to drive forward the city's "digital agenda". One of his responsibilities was to oversee the modernisation of Birmingham City Council's IT system.

He was appointed Member of the Order of the British Empire (MBE) in the 1991 Birthday Honours for "political and public service" and Commander of the Order of the British Empire (CBE) in the 2014 Birthday Honours for services to local government.
