= Aston (Birmingham ward) =

Electoral ward of Birmingham City Council

Aston is a ward covering an area of north east Birmingham, including the district of Aston.

== Demographics ==
The 2011 census found that 32,286 people were living in Aston. 50.4% of the population was female and 49.6% was male. This was above and below the national and city average respectively.

Aston is a very diverse community, ethnically, with 44% of the population born outside the United Kingdom. The largest ethnic group was Asian at 55%. More specifically, the Pakistani ethnic group was the largest at 38% of all Asians. Black British was the second largest ethnic group at 26%. White British was the third largest ethnic group at 18%. Islam was the most prominent religion in the ward with 54% of the ward's population stating themselves as Muslim, above the city average. Christianity was the second most prominent religion in Aston at 26%.

The ethnic makeup of the area drastically changed in the 1950s and 1960s with immigration from the Commonwealth. Most of the immigrants were from the Indian subcontinent, though a significant number were from the Caribbean.

== Ward history ==
The ward was created in 1911, when Birmingham gained the Aston Manor Urban District. As a typical inner city ward, which tends to lose population the boundaries have been altered on a number of occasions.

== Election fraud scandal ==
In 2004 the ward saw a voter fraud scandal in which Labour councillors were guilty of a systematic attempt to rig elections. They had set up a "vote-rigging factory" in a disused warehouse, stealing and intercepting hundreds and possibly thousands of ballot papers to achieve this. Three councillors, Mohammed Islam, Muhammed Afzal (later cleared) and Mohammed Kazi were convicted of voter fraud, with the elections having to be rerun. All three were barred from standing in the following election. The charges against Afzal were quashed by the Court of Appeal.

== Politics ==
The Aston ward is currently represented by two councillors: Mumtaz Hussain, a Liberal Democrat, and Abdul Shumon, an independent.

== Election results ==
=== 2020s ===
==== Aston ====
Aston 2026
Party	Candidate	Votes	%	±%
Independent	Abdul Choudhury Shumon	2,254	36.1	New
Liberal Democrats	Mumtaz Hussain	2,115	33.9	▼9.5
Liberal Democrats	Saeed Ahmed	1,610	25.8	▼25.6
Labour	Mohammed Hanif	1,505	24.1	▼17.9
Labour	Zafar Ali	1,161	18.6	▼19.3
Independent	Ziaul Islam	877	14.1	New
Green	Claire Groom	554	8.9	New
Independent	Naib Hussain	542	8.7	New
Green	Carol Guest	462	7.4	New
Independent	Dorothy Elizabeth Gerald	128	2.1	New
Reform	Desmond Hayden Dobson	111	1.8	New
Reform	Adam Fitzgerald	109	1.7	New
Conservative	Damon Scott Shinnie	98	1.6	▼2.1
Conservative	Derek Desmond Harold Lambert	95	1.5	▼1.5
Majority		505	8.1	
Turnout			41.77	
Registered electors		14,938		
Independent gain from Independent		Swing		
Liberal Democrats hold		Swing		

Aston 2022 (2)
Party	Candidate	Votes	%	±%
Liberal Democrats	Ayoub Khan	3,012		
Liberal Democrats	Mumtaz Hussain	2,542		
Labour	Muhammad Afzal	2,463		
Labour	Nagina Kauser	2,223		
Breakthrough Party	Nazma Meah	265		
Conservative	Jahid Choudhury	216		
Conservative	Lokman Hakim	177		
We Matter Party	Dorothy Gerald	148		
We Matter Party	Raymond Coke	127		
Majority				
Turnout			40	
Liberal Democrats gain from Labour		Swing		
Liberal Democrats gain from Labour		Swing		

=== 2010s ===
Aston 2018 (2)
Party	Candidate	Votes	%	±%
Labour	Muhammad Afzal	2,902	46.3	−41.6
Labour	Nagina Kauser	2,793		
Liberal Democrats	Ayoub Khan	2,252	35.9	+34.2
Liberal Democrats	Sham Uddin	1,546		
Independent	Abdul Aziz	1,134	18.1	+18.1
Conservative	Jahid Choudhury	891	14.2	+10.6
Conservative	Margaret Bennett	328		
Green	Vijay Rana	160	2.6	−0.5
Majority		650	10.4	
Turnout		6,266	44.1	+12.0
Labour win (new seat)				
Labour win (new seat)				

Birmingham City Council election: Aston Ward – 5 May 2016 Electorate: 17,852
Party	Candidate	Votes	%	±%
Labour	Nagina Kauser	5,074	87.9	+4.3
Conservative	Jahid A. Choudhury	208	3.6	−3.3
Green	Christopher P. Garghan	181	3.1	−1.6
Christian	Adrian A. Dawkins	159	2.7	+2.7
Liberal Democrats	Yaser Iqbal	100	1.7	−3.1
Majority		4866	87.9	+11.8
Turnout		5744	32.1	−20
Labour hold		Swing		

Birmingham City Council election: Aston Ward – 7 May 2015 Electorate: 19,053
Party	Candidate	Votes	%	±%
Labour	Muhammad Afzal	8,388	83.6	+14.9
Conservative	Joel C. Buckett	693	6.9	2.2
Liberal Democrats	Rezaul I. Billah	479	4.8	−17.2
Green	Hazel M. Clawley	474	4.7	+4.7
Majority		7695	76.1	+29.4
Turnout		10110	53.1	
Labour hold		Swing		

Birmingham City Council election: Aston Ward – 22 May 2014 Electorate Turnout
Party	Candidate	Votes	%	±%
Labour	Ziaul Islam	4,175	68.7	+18.2
Liberal Democrats	Sham Uddin	1,341	22.0	−22.2
Conservative	Thomas Pike	452	7.4	+5.4
Independent	Abdusalam bin Smith	108	1.7	−0.4
Majority		2834	46.7	+13.0
Turnout				
Labour hold		Swing		

Birmingham City Council election: Aston Ward – 3 May 2012 Electorate: 21,077
Party	Candidate	Votes	%	±%
Labour	Nagina Kauser	3,567	50.5	−11.9
Liberal Democrats	Ayoub Khan	3,123	44.2	+14.3
Independent	Abdusalam bin Smith	145	2.1	–
Conservative	Ian Colpman	138	2.0	−2.2
Green	Ankaret Harmer	94	1.3	−1.6
Majority		444	6.3	−26.3
Turnout			33.7	+0.1
Labour hold		Swing		

Birmingham City Council election: Aston Ward – 5 May 2011 Electorate 19,982
Party	Candidate	Votes	%	±%
Labour	Muhammad Afzal	4,562	62.4	+7.6
Liberal Democrats	Mohammed Hanif	2,187	29.9	−3.5
Conservative	Adam Felman	304	4.2	−1.2
Green	Aby Alamgir	209	2.9	+0.6
Majority		2,375	32.5	+10.1
Turnout			33.6	+11.2
Labour hold		Swing		

Birmingham City Council election: Aston Ward – 6 May 2010 Electorate 19,877 Turnout 53.1%,
Party	Candidate	Votes	%	±%
Labour	Ziaul Islam	5,683	54.8	
Liberal Democrats	Sham Uddin	3,360	32.4	
Conservative	Gareth Moore	564	5.4	
Independent	Abdusalam Smith	321	3.1	
Green	Alan Bale	242	2.3	
Majority		2,323	22.4	
Labour hold		Swing		

=== 2000s ===
1 May 2008
Party	Candidate	Votes	%	±%
Liberal Democrats	Ayoub Khan	2,769	38.6	
Labour	Amjad Hussain	2,417	33.7	
Respect	Abdul Aziz	1,406	19.6	
Conservative	Tom Nyeko Olam	206	2.9	
Green	David Goley	118	1.6	
UKIP	Abdul Azad	113	1.6	
BNP	Alan Chamberlain	105	1.5	
Majority		252	4.9	
Turnout			29.0	
Liberal Democrats gain from Labour		Swing		

Aston 2007
Party	Candidate	Votes	%	±%
Labour	Muhammad Afzal	2,684		
Respect	Abdul Aziz	2,018		
Liberal Democrats	Saeed Aehmed	2,005		
Conservative	Mohammed Hasan	209		
Green	Liam Wilkinson	165		
BNP	Pamela Allen	136		
Majority		666		
Turnout		7,255	39.9	
Labour hold		Swing	{{{swing}}}	

4 May 2006 Electorate Turnout %,
Party	Candidate	Votes	%	±%
Labour	Ziaul Islam	3,234	%	
Liberal Democrats	Abdul Khalique	2,698	%	
Independent	Kenneth Vernon Jeffers	283	%	
Respect	Alliya Genevieve Stennett	242		
Conservative	Mohammed Mushtaq	213	%	
BNP	Dennis Gary Phillips	170		
Green	Geoffrey Tapalu	100		
Majority		536	%	
Turnout		6,940	7.7%	
Labour gain from Liberal		Swing		

6 May 2004 Electorate Turnout %,
Party	Candidate	Votes	%	±%
Conservative			%	
Labour			%	
Liberal			%	
Independent			%	
Majority			%	
Labour gain from Liberal		Swing		
Labour hold		Swing		

1 May 2003 Electorate 16,985 Turnout 29.0%,
Party	Candidate	Votes	%	±%
Liberal Democrats	A Khan	2,467	50.1%	
Labour	A Malik	1,868	38.0%	
Conservative	G Khan	560	11.4%	
Majority		599	12.1%	
Liberal Democrats gain from Labour		Swing		

2 May 2002 Electorate 16,983 Turnout 16.1%,
Party	Candidate	Votes	%	±%
Labour	A Kennedy	2,347	86.1%	
Labour	N Ahmed	1,734	63.6%	
Liberal Democrats	M Monu	499	18.3%	
People's Justice	Z Ahmed	383	14.0%	
Conservative	G Khan	325	11.9%	
Independent	M Miah	164	6.0%	
Majority		1,848 & 1,235	67.8% & 45.3%	
Labour hold		Swing		
Labour hold		Swing		

4 May 2000 Electorate 16,945 Turnout 26.1%,
Party	Candidate	Votes	%	±%
Labour	M Afzal	2,245	50.8%	
Independent	A Bahar	1,240	28.0%	
Conservative	M Shaw	635	14.4%	
Liberal Democrats	S Dad	265	6.0%	
Majority		1,005	22.8%	
Labour hold		Swing		

=== 1990s ===
6 May 1999 Electorate 17,180 Turnout 27.4%,
Party	Candidate	Votes	%	±%
Labour	A Iftikhar	2,319	49.2%	
Independent	G Miah	1,361	28.9%	
Conservative	A Choudhury	366	7.8%	
Independent	M Rahman	228	4.8%	
Liberal Democrats	U Shariff-Sliame	205	4.4%	
Independent	J Foster	164	3.5%	
Majority		958	20.3%	
Labour gain from Liberal		Swing		
Labour hold		Swing		

7 May 1998 Electorate 17,023 Turnout 20.7%,
Party	Candidate	Votes	%	±%
Labour	A Kennedy	2,504	71.1%	
Conservative	O Shariff	656	18.6%	
Independent	J Foster	334	9.5%	
Majority		1,848	52.5%	
Labour hold		Swing		

2 May 1996 Electorate 17,364 Turnout 63.7%,
Party	Candidate	Votes	%	±%
Labour	M Afzal	2,511	63.7%	
Conservative	C Winters	457	11.6%	
Independent	J Foster	365	9.3%	
Independent	O Shariff	291	7.4%	
Liberal Democrats	S Horvat-Marcovic	288	7.3%	
Majority		2,054	52.1%	
Labour hold		Swing		

4 May 1995 Electorate 17,649 Turnout 26.7%,
Party	Candidate	Votes	%	±%
Labour	S Stacey	3,468	73.6%	
Conservative	R Li	499	10.6%	
Independent	O Shariff	281	6.0%	
Liberal Democrats	S Horvat-Marcovic	278	5.9%	
Green	P Slatter	130	2.8%	
Majority			%	
Labour gain from Liberal		Swing		
Labour hold		Swing		

5 May 1994 Electorate 17,334 Turnout 33.5%,
Party	Candidate	Votes	%	±%
Labour	A Chauhan	3,401	58.6%	
Conservative	A Choudhury	1,619	27.9%	
Liberal Democrats	S Horvat-Marcovic	399	6.9%	
Green	A Clawley	388	6.7%	
Majority		2,782	30.7%	
Labour gain from Liberal		Swing		
Labour hold		Swing		

7 May 1992 Electorate 17,867 Turnout 23.2%,
Party	Candidate	Votes	%	±%
Labour	M Afzal	2,514	60.7%	
Conservative	Z Mian	894	21.6%	
Liberal Democrats	D Bennett	433	10.4%	
Green	A Clawley	231	5.6%	
Independent	K Tunaley	65	1.6%	
Majority			%	
Labour gain from Liberal		Swing		
Labour hold		Swing		

2 May 1991 Electorate 17,809 Turnout 31.9%,
Party	Candidate	Votes	%	±%
Labour	S Stacey	3,827	67.4%	
Conservative	Z Mian	840	14.8%	
Liberal Democrats	D Bennett	598	10.5%	
Green	H Clawley	376	6.6%	
Majority			%	
Labour gain from Liberal		Swing		
Labour hold		Swing		

3 May 1990 Electorate 17,506 Turnout 36.9%,
Party	Candidate	Votes	%	±%
Labour	E Carless	5,024	77.8%	
Conservative	N Kayani	618	9.6%	
Liberal	R Crosbee	433	6.7%	
Green	H Clawley	384	5.9%	
Majority			%	
Labour gain from Liberal		Swing		
Labour hold		Swing		

=== 1980s ===
5 May 1988 Electorate 18,167 Turnout 30.6%,
Party	Candidate	Votes	%	±%
Labour	M Afzal	4,338	78.0%	
Conservative	S Ratra	625	11.2%	
Independent	B Ali	464	8.3%	
Independent	S Singh	136	2,4%	
Majority		3,713	66.8%	
Labour gain from Liberal		Swing		
Labour hold		Swing		

7 May 1987 Electorate 18,621 Turnout 34.3%,
Party	Candidate	Votes	%	±%
Labour	F Carter	4,517	70.7%	
Liberal	T Nightingale	871	13.6%	
Conservative	S Ratra	774	12.1%	
Green	G Grainger	219	3.4%	
Majority		3,646	57.1%	
Labour hold		Swing		

1 May 1986 Electorate 18,869 Turnout 31.7%,
Party	Candidate	Votes	%	±%
Labour	E Carless	4,342	72.6%	
Liberal	G Crosbee	1,012	16.9%	
Conservative	C Harrison	515	8.6%	
Majority		3,230	55.7%	
Labour hold		Swing		

3 May 1984 Electorate 19,300 Turnout 32.3%,
Party	Candidate	Votes	%	±%
Labour	M Afzal	3,949	63.3%	
Liberal	G Crosbee	1,580	25.3%	
Conservative	J Dad	701	11.2%	
Majority		2,369	38.0%	
Labour hold		Swing		

5 May 1983 Electorate 19,069 Turnout 38.7%,
Party	Candidate	Votes	%	±%
Labour	F Carter	5,218	70.7%	
Liberal	S Anderson	1,170	15.9%	
Conservative	G Bayliss	939	12.7%	
Majority		4,038	54.8%	
Labour hold		Swing		

6 May 1982 Electorate 19,187 Turnout 35.9%,
Party	Candidate	Votes	%	±%
Labour	E Carless	3,209	46.6%	
Labour	M Afzal	3,119	45.3%	
Labour	F Carter	3,038	44.1%	
Liberal	Paul Tilsley	2,546	37.0%	
Liberal	R Millichip	2,171	31.5%	
Liberal	M Sharpe	2,040	29.6%	
Conservative	G Bayliss	884	12.8%	
Conservative	M Price	695	10.1%	
Conservative	H Hordern	594	8.6%	
Majority		663, 573 & 492	9.6%, 8.3% & 7.1%	
Labour gain from Liberal		Swing		
Labour hold		Swing		
Labour hold		Swing		

1 May 1980 Electorate Turnout %,
Party	Candidate	Votes	%	±%
Labour	G Eynon	1,702	51.6%	
Liberal	G Gopsill	1,413	42.8%	
Conservative	Z Saeed	185	5.6%	
Majority		289	8.8%	
Labour gain from Liberal		Swing		

=== 1970s ===
3 May 1979 Electorate 7,534 Turnout 62.6%,
Party	Candidate	Votes	%	±%
Labour	E Carless	2,702	57.3%	
Liberal	G Hughes	1,483	31.4%	
Conservative	K Wooldridge	534	11.3%	
Majority		1,219	25.9%	
Labour gain from Liberal		Swing		

4 May 1978 Electorate 7,715 Turnout 48.9%,
Party	Candidate	Votes	%	±%
Liberal	Paul Tilsley	1,919	50.8%	
Labour	E Carless	1,697	44.9%	
Conservative	J Spittle	160	4.2%	
Majority		222	5.9%	
Labour gain from Liberal		Swing		
Liberal hold		Swing		

6 May 1976 Electorate 7,533 Turnout 39.9%,
Party	Candidate	Votes	%	±%
Liberal	G Gopsill	1,387	46.1%	
Labour	E Carless	1,203	40.0%	
Conservative	J Kemp	252	8.4%	
National Front	C Driscoll	112	3.7%	
Independent	S Banner	38	1.3%	
Majority		184	6.1%	
Liberal hold		Swing		

1 May 1975 Electorate 7,635 Turnout 35.7%,
Party	Candidate	Votes	%	±%
Liberal	G Hughes	1,527	56.1%	
Labour	E Carless	944	34.7%	
Conservative	Wilkins	253	9.3%	
Majority		583	21.4%	
Liberal hold		Swing		

2 May 1974 Electorate 7,635 Turnout 35.7%,
Party	Candidate	Votes	%	±%
Liberal	G Hughes	1,527	56.1%	
Labour	E Carless	944	34.7%	
Conservative	Wilkins	253	9.3%	
Majority		583	21.4%	
Liberal hold		Swing		

3 May 1973 Electorate 7,736 Turnout 35.7%,
Party	Candidate	Votes	%	±%
Liberal	Paul Tilsley	2,000	72.4%	
Liberal	G Gopsill	1,884	68.2%	
Liberal	G Hughes	1,846	66.8%	
Labour	B Downey	743	26.9%	
Labour	F Deakin	727	26.3%	
Labour	J Brooke	677	24.5%	
Conservative	R Harris	127	4.6%	
Conservative	J Kemp	119	4.3%	
Conservative	S Wilkins	104	3.8%	
Independent	K Taylor	60	2.2%	
Majority		1,257, 1,141 & 1,103	45.5%, 41.3% &39.9%	
Liberal hold		Swing		
Liberal hold		Swing		
Liberal hold		Swing		

4 May 1972 Electorate 8,464 Turnout 37.1%,
Party	Candidate	Votes	%	±%
Liberal	G Gopsill	1,707	54.4%	
Labour	F Bagshaw	1,199	38.2%	
Conservative	R Jauncey	231	7.4%	
Majority		508	16.2%	
Liberal hold		Swing		

13 May 1971 Electorate 10,188 Turnout 36.8%,
Party	Candidate	Votes	%	±%
Liberal	Paul Tilsley	2,225	59.3%	
Labour	F Bagshaw	1,213	32.3%	
Conservative	F O’Brien	312	8.3%	
Majority		1,012	27.0%	
Liberal hold		Swing		

7 May 1970 Electorate 12,527 Turnout 22.7%,
Party	Candidate	Votes	%	±%
Liberal	H Minnis	1,151	40.5%	
Labour	Stan Yapp	1,128	39.6%	
Conservative	D Krause	433	15.2%	
Independent	A Shorthouse	133	4.7%	
Majority		23	0.9%	
Liberal gain from Labour		Swing		

=== 1960s ===
8 May 1969 Electorate 14,033 Turnout 23.2%,
Party	Candidate	Votes	%	±%
Liberal	G Gopsill	1,894	58.1%	
Labour	E MacDonald	697	21.4%	
Conservative	F O’Brien	583	17.9%	
Communist	N Jelf	85	2.6%	
Majority		1,197	36.7%	
Liberal gain from Labour		Swing		

9 May 1968 Electorate 15,070 Turnout 31.6%,
Party	Candidate	Votes	%	±%
Liberal	Paul Tilsley	2,475	52.0%	
Conservative	C Hamilton	1,118	23.5%	
Labour	F Gillespie	1,080	22.7%	
Communist	N Jelf	84	1.8%	
Majority		1,357	28.5%	
Liberal gain from Labour		Swing		

11 May 1967 Electorate 16,977 Turnout 20.5%,
Party	Candidate	Votes	%	±%
Labour	S Styles	1,525	43.8%	
Conservative	F O’Brien	1,045	30.0%	
Liberal	Paul Tilsley	780	22.4%	
Communist	J Leishman	131	3.8%	
Majority		480	13.8%	
Labour hold		Swing		

12 May 1966 Electorate 17,605 Turnout 22.3%,
Party	Candidate	Votes	%	±%
Labour	E MacDonald	2,383	60.7%	
Conservative	F O’Brien	1,355	34.5%	
Communist	J Leishman	185	4.7%	
Majority		1,028	26.2%	
Labour hold		Swing		

13 May 1965 Electorate 17,996 Turnout 22.8%,
Party	Candidate	Votes	%	±%
Labour	F Gillespie	2,077	50.5%	
Conservative	F O’Brien	1,696	41.3%	
Liberal	R Bourne	219	5.3%	
Communist	J Leishman	119	2.9%	
Majority		381	9.2%	
Labour hold		Swing		

7 May 1964 Electorate 18,062 Turnout 23.8%,
Party	Candidate	Votes	%	±%
Labour	S Styles	2,888	67.2%	
Conservative	F O’Brien	1,212	28.2%	
Labour	S Styles	2,888	67.2%	
Communist	J Leishman	197	4.6%	
Majority		1,676	39.0%	
Labour hold		Swing		

9 May 1963 Electorate 18.573 Turnout 23.9%,
Party	Candidate	Votes	%	±%
Labour	E MacDonald	3,107	70.1%	
Conservative	L Lanham	1,096	24.7%	
Communist	J Leishman	227	5.1%	
Majority		2,111	45.4%	
Labour hold		Swing		

10 May 1962 Electorate 19,129 Turnout 23.4%,
Party	Candidate	Votes	%	±%
Labour	F Gillespie	2,775	61.9%	
Conservative	F Gillespie	1,140	25.4%	
Liberal	K Day	453	10.1%	
Communist	J Leishman	115	2.6%	
Majority		1,635	36.5%	
Labour hold		Swing		

11 May 1961 Electorate 17,176 Turnout 29.2%,
Party	Candidate	Votes	%	±%
Labour	S Styles	3,099	61.9%	
Conservative	A Hinton	1,275	25.5%	
Liberal	G Wilson	482	9.6%	
Communist	J Leishman	153	3.1%	
Majority		1,724	66.4%	
Labour hold		Swing		

12 May 1960 Electorate 17,421 Turnout 20.1%,
Party	Candidate	Votes	%	±%
Conservative	A Hinton	1,332	38.1%	
Labour	E MacDonald	1,998	57.2%	
Communist	J Leishman	166	4.7%	
Majority		666	19.1%	
Labour hold		Swing		

=== 1950s ===
14 May 1959 Electorate 17,808 Turnout 26.6%,
Party	Candidate	Votes	%	±%
Conservative	A Hinton	1,409	29.7%	
Labour	F Gillespie	3,161	66.7%	
Communist	J Leishman	167	3.5%	
Majority		1,752	37.0%	
Labour hold		Swing		

8 May 1958 Electorate 17,911 Turnout 31.0%,
Party	Candidate	Votes	%	±%
Labour	S Styles	3,955	71.2%	
Conservative	A Gilroy Bevan	1,369	24.6%	
Communist	J Leishman	232	4.2%	
Majority		2,586	46.6%	
Labour hold		Swing		

9 May 1957 Electorate 17,899 Turnout 25.7%,
Party	Candidate	Votes	%	±%
Labour	J Wood	3,156	68.6%	
Conservative	K Freshwater	1,292	28.1%	
Communist	J Leishman	153	3.3%	
Majority		1,864	40.5%	
Labour hold		Swing		

10 May 1956 Electorate 18,267 Turnout 27.3%,
Party	Candidate	Votes	%	±%
Labour	F Gillespie	3,286	65.8%	
Conservative	K Freshwater	1,527	30.6%	
Communist	J Leishman	181	3.6%	
Majority		1,759	35.2%	
Labour gain from Liberal		Swing		
Labour hold		Swing		

12 May 1955 Electorate 18,608 Turnout 32.1%,
Party	Candidate	Votes	%	±%
Conservative	C Whitehead	2.009	33.6%	
Labour	S Styles	3,812	63.8%	
Communist	J Leishman	153	2.6%	
Majority		1,803	30.2%	
Labour hold		Swing		

13 May 1954 Electorate 18,810 Turnout 32.7%,
Party	Candidate	Votes	%	±%
Labour	J Wood	3,576	58.2%	
Conservative	R Freshwater	2,396	39.0%	
Communist	J Leishman	173	2.8%	
Majority		1,180	19.2%	
Labour hold		Swing		

7 May 1953 Electorate 19,145 Turnout 30.5%,
Party	Candidate	Votes	%	±%
Conservative	C Whitehead	1,834	31.4%	
Labour	F Gillespie	3,910	66.9%	
Communist	W Evans	100	1.7%	
Majority		2,076	35.5%	
Labour hold		Swing		

8 May 1952 Electorate 19,508 Turnout 39.2%,
Party	Candidate	Votes	%	±%
Labour	S Styles	5,586	73.0%	
Conservative	C Whitehead	1,964	25.7%	
Communist	J Leishman	101	1.3%	
Majority		3,622	47.3%	
Labour hold		Swing		

10 May 1951 Electorate 19,572 Turnout 34.9%,
Party	Candidate	Votes	%	±%
Labour	J Wood	3,720	54.4%	
Conservative	F Lennon	2,977	43.5%	
Communist	O Dorman	139	2.0%	
Majority		743	10.9%	
Labour hold		Swing		

11 May 1950 Electorate 19,709 Turnout 35.7%,
Party	Candidate	Votes	%	±%
Labour	H Watton	4,341	61.7%	
Conservative	F Lannon	2,577	36.6%	
Communist	J Leishman	117	1.7%	
Majority		1,764	25.1%	
Labour hold		Swing		

=== 1940s ===
12 May 1949 Electorate 19,643 Turnout 45.0%,
Party	Candidate	Votes	%	±%
Labour	F Moody	5,075	57.4%	
Conservative	I Shelley	3,769	42.6%	
Majority		1,306	14.8%	
Labour hold		Swing		

1 November 1947 Electorate 19,423 Turnout 42.9%,
Party	Candidate	Votes	%	±%
Labour	J Wood	4,373	52.5%	
Conservative	D Heath	3,962	47.5%	
Majority		411	5.0%	
Labour gain from Conservative		Swing		

2 November 1946 Electorate 18,858 Turnout 34.0%,
Party	Candidate	Votes	%	±%
Labour	H Watton	4,031	62.8%	
Conservative	W Blackwell	2,386	37.2%	
Majority		1,645	25.6%	
Labour gain from Conservative		Swing		

3 November 1945 Electorate 18,224 Turnout 35.1%,
Party	Candidate	Votes	%	±%
Labour	F Moody	4,535	70.8%	
Conservative	H Farr	1,867	29.2%	
Majority		2,668	41.6%	
Labour gain from Conservative		Swing		
