= John Clancy (Labour politician) =

English Labour Party politician

Professor John Clancy
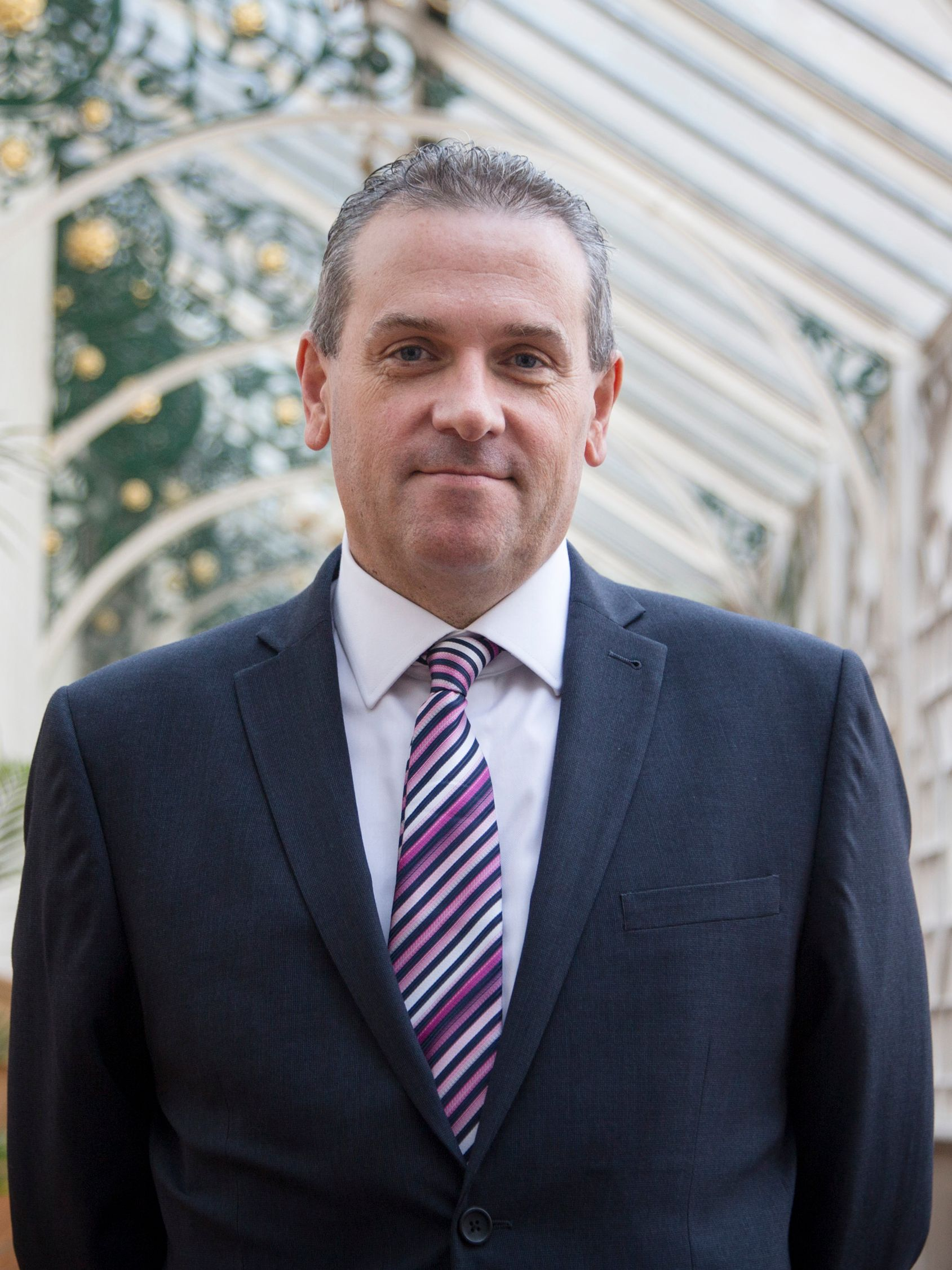
- Clancy in Birmingham Council House's Crystal Gallery, in 2015

Leader of Birmingham City Council
- In office 1 December 2015 – 11 September 2017
- Preceded by: Sir Albert Bore
- Succeeded by: Ian Ward

Member of Birmingham City Council for Hodge Hill
- In office 2002–2006

Member of Birmingham City Council for Quinton
- In office May 2011 – March 2020

Personal details
- Party: Labour
- Occupation: Professor and politician
- Known for: Former leader of Birmingham City Council

John Clancy is a British politician, who was leader of Birmingham City Council from 2015 to 2017, he is currently a visiting professor at Birmingham City University Business School, and a qualified solicitor.

He is an expert on public sector pension funds and hyper-local data and researches these areas in particular at Birmingham City University.

As political leader of Birmingham, he was in charge of an annual revenue budget of over £3 billion, and assets of over £6 billion.

== Municipal Socialism and Brummie Bonds ==
He was particularly known for re-introducing to the U.K. the local authority funding method of Municipal Bonds for House building. These bonds in Birmingham were known as ‘Brummie Bonds”. In 2017 the City Council issued £45 million in Brummie Bonds.

Clancy espoused the concept of Municipal Socialism, with a nod to Birmingham’s Joseph Chamberlain, where a local council becomes an active economic actor in the local economy, rather than being a passive deliverer of services and welfare.

The concept being that by putting the £6 billion of assets and spending power of the City Council, and its presence as an anchor institution of the city, into economic development, the critical welfare services of the city (and reliance on government funding) would be needed much less.

The Brummie Bonds issue was a significant part of the process. Clancy saw this as a part of a wider process of rewiring new local economic pathways and what he referred to as “confident acts of local economic self-determination”.

== Housing ==
He identified the most pressing challenge facing Birmingham to be its lack of housing to meet a fast-growing, young population and the poor quality of much of the social housing which was existing. He proposed bringing in the council’s and other wealth from global capital into meeting the need to kickstart a massive house building programme and building council houses at a scale not seen since the 1960s.

Clancy led a number of overseas trade missions to sidestep U.K. and Government funding shortfalls to fund house-building and economic regeneration. In particular he signed a £2 billion agreement for investment in housing in the city with Guangdong-based developer Country Garden during his week-long trade mission to China.

== West Midlands Local Government Pension Fund and Capita re-negotiations ==
Utilising the wealth of the West Midlands Local Government Pension Fund to invest in the city and its region was also a frequent policy call as part of local economy rewiring.

He identified the Fund as draining assets and resources away from the region and in particular challenged its calls to local government in the region for extra funding to pay down what he termed illusory deficits whilst they were making cuts to services due to central government cuts. He demanded cuts to the fund’s bills to the city council, and managed to negotiate them down considerably by £24 million in one year according to local media.

After criticising the size of the budget pay-outs to outsourcing giant Capita through the City Council’s outsourcing Joint venture Service Birmingham for many years, Clancy announced the ending of the joint venture in 2017 and a wind-down of the relationship saving the City Council £43 million over 4 years.

These two renegotiations enabled Clancy to shield the city from £35 million of further cuts to the city’s services in the first year of their effects.

== Children’s Services ==
Shortly after he became council leader, Clancy was responsible for the decision voluntarily to move the failing Children’s Services department at Birmingham City Council into an external trust in May 2016. After being judged as failing in successive government inspections since 2008, he said there had been "some progress" but it was "not sufficient enough for us all to be satisfied children are safe in this city". However, Clancy said it was still a facing a "huge challenge".

Speaking at the time Clancy remarked of the challenge that it was “the biggest challenge in [British] politics, certainly in local government terms.”

Apparently vindicating Clancy’s decision, three years later, the services were finally judged no longer to be inadequate. The Children’s minister at the time Nadhim Zahawi described Ofsted's judgment as "a significant milestone". During Clancy’s leadership period there were no deaths to children in care at the council due to neglect.

== Pensions ==
Clancy has written extensively on public sector pensions and is regularly quoted in the U.K. national media on the subject.

His research work at Birmingham City University is based at the Centre for Brexit Studies, and the Centre for Regional Economic Development and Investment (CREDIT).

During the BREXIT process Clancy questioned the status of the EU Commission’s unfunded Pension Scheme and whether the U.K.’s liability for future payments post-BREXIT were accurate or existed at all.

His book The Secret Wealth Garden - rewiring local government pension funds into regional economies (2014) introduced to a wider world the area of U.K. Local Government Pension Funds.

He was C.E.O. of Pension Fund Analysis Limited.

== Hyper-local Data analysis and Covid-19 hyper-local contexts ==
Clancy began researching how hyper-local neighbourhoods in the U.K. experienced life differently from each other even in a relatively local context. This was initially to explore how especially non-urban, rural and coastal areas, which he termed ‘ruralpolitan’ and ‘coastalpolitan’ had appeared to experience very differently the Brexit referendum, the implementation of its result and the political fall-out from these events. He suggested these areas were part of a ‘left-behind’ and culturally ignored class because political policy had been based for decades by different political parties around city and large urban areas and their needs.

Clancy’s analysis looked at MSOAs (medium level super output areas used for census) of around 7,000 people and LSOAs (around 1,500 or 650 households) at a more granular level. He compiled and collated wide sources of that MSOA and LSOA data relating especially to population density, BAME, age, deprivation levels, neighbourhood characteristics, health and rural/urban classifications. This data architecture is the basis for further research on hyper-local experience of Brexit but also in other areas of the experience and political behaviour in neighbourhoods in the U.K.

Clancy applied the research to neighbourhoods’ experience of the 2020 Covid-19 pandemic, and how neighbourhoods had successfully withstood or been more vulnerable to the impact of the virus.

=== Covid-19 lockdown policy ===
Clancy argued that policy responses during the pandemic should be based on hyper-local data where better intervention at that level would be more successful, rather than wider lockdown responses across towns, cities and regions. He was particularly critical in August 2020 of suggestions that the entire city of Birmingham could be put into a local lockdown, when hyper-local data suggested it was not a city-wide issue. He suggested hyper-local interventions.

Clancy also pointed to the differences in quality of the data upon which government lockdown policy was being based, as between test data on the one hand, which he suggested were at an unreliable stage for policy response, and the more reliable hyper-local deaths data on the other. He also proposed that local health data and hospital admissions was the place to start to base any policy response. Local intensive care doctors in Birmingham also urged caution at the same time as deaths and hospital admissions were very low across the city.

He produced data at the time showing that his research based around the governments own MSOA test figures showed at the time that 91% of England had not recorded a single Covid-19 case for 4 weeks.

The analysis was widely reported in the local and national press.

== Background ==
He co-authored Blogs from the Blackstuff – The case for rewiring the economy (2010) with Professor David Bailey. He has written widely in the media on regional economic development.

Clancy is a former corporate lawyer, having worked as a solicitor at Lee Crowder in Birmingham in the 1990s.

He was a councillor for the city's Hodge Hill ward from 2002 to 2006, and was elected to represent Quinton in May 2011. Clancy stepped down as leader during a labour dispute at the council when a deal he had prepared to end a refuse collection strike was prevented from being implemented. The deal was later implemented after a court case was brought by the union, which the new council administration was forced to settle, apparently vindicating Clancy’s position, when the union succeeded in winning an injunction prior to full trial. He remained on Birmingham City Council as councillor for Quinton until March 2020.

Clancy is from Stockport, Greater Manchester, but lived in Birmingham for 30 years, from 1990 until 2020. He graduated from the University of Keele in Law and English. His career has included stints as a teacher, visiting lecturer at University of Birmingham Business School and solicitor. He was also a columnist for the Birmingham Post until 2015. He is married to a former assistant principal of a Black Country comprehensive school, and they have one daughter. Clancy moved away from Birmingham in 2020 and now lives in North Wales.

Political offices
Preceded by Albert Bore	Leader of Birmingham City Council; 2015 to 2017	Succeeded by Ian Ward
