= List of electoral wards in the West Midlands (county) =

This is a list of electoral divisions and wards in the ceremonial county of West Midlands in the West Midlands. All changes since the re-organisation of local government following the passing of the Local Government Act 1972 are shown. The number of councillors elected for each electoral division or ward is shown in brackets.

== District councils ==
=== Birmingham ===
Wards from 1 April 1974 (first election 10 May 1973) to 6 May 1982:

Wards from 6 May 1982 to 10 June 2004:

Wards from 10 June 2004 to 3 May 2018:

1. Acocks Green (3)
2. Aston (3)
3. Bartley Green (3)
4. Billesley (3)
5. Bordesley Green (3)
6. Bournville (3)
7. Brandwood (3)
8. Edgbaston (3)
9. Erdington (3)
10. Hall Green (3)
11. Handsworth Wood (3)
12. Harborne (3)
13. Hodge Hill (3)
14. Kings Norton (3)
15. Kingstanding (3)
16. Ladywood (3)
17. Longbridge (3)
18. Lozells & East Handsworth (3)
19. Moseley & Kings Heath (3)
20. Nechells (3)
21. Northfield (3)
22. Oscott (3)
23. Perry Barr (3)
24. Quinton (3)
25. Selly Oak (3)
26. Shard End (3)
27. Sheldon (3)
28. Soho (3)
29. South Yardley (3)
30. Sparkbrook (3)
31. Springfield (3)
32. Stechford & Yardley North (3)
33. Stockland Green (3)
34. Sutton Four Oaks (3)
35. Sutton New Hall (3)
36. Sutton Trinity (3)
37. Sutton Vesey (3)
38. Tyburn (3)
39. Washwood Heath (3)
40. Weoley (3)

Wards from 3 May 2018 to present:

1. Acocks Green (2)
2. Allens Cross (1)
3. Alum Rock (2)
4. Aston (2)
5. Balsall Heath West (1)
6. Bartley Green (2)
7. Billesley (2)
8. Birchfield (1)
9. Bordesley & Highgate (1)
10. Bordesley Green (1)
11. Bournbrook & Selly Park (2)
12. Bournville & Cotteridge (2)
13. Brandwood & King's Heath (2)
14. Bromford & Hodge Hill (2)
15. Castle Vale (1)
16. Druids Heath & Monyhull (1)
17. Edgbaston (2)
18. Erdington (2)
19. Frankley Great Park (1)
20. Garretts Green (1)
21. Glebe Farm & Tile Cross (2)
22. Gravelly Hill (1)
23. Hall Green North (2)
24. Hall Green South (1)
25. Handsworth (1)
26. Handsworth Wood (2)
27. Harborne (2)
28. Heartlands (1)
29. Highter's Heath (1)
30. Holyhead (1)
31. King's Norton North (1)
32. King's Norton South (1)
33. Kingstanding (2)
34. Ladywood (2)
35. Longbridge & West Heath (2)
36. Lozells (1)
37. Moseley (2)
38. Nechells (1)
39. Newtown (1)
40. North Edgbaston (2)
41. Northfield (1)
42. Oscott (2)
43. Perry Barr (2)
44. Perry Common (1)
45. Pype Hayes (1)
46. Quinton (2)
47. Rubery & Rednal (1)
48. Shard End (1)
49. Sheldon (2)
50. Small Heath (2)
51. Soho & Jewellery Quarter (2)
52. South Yardley (1)
53. Sparkbrook & Balsall Heath (2)
54. Sparkhill (2)
55. Stirchley (1)
56. Stockland Green (2)
57. Sutton Four Oaks (1)
58. Sutton Mere Green (1)
59. Sutton Reddicap (1)
60. Sutton Roughley (1)
61. Sutton Trinity (1)
62. Sutton Vesey (2)
63. Sutton Walmley & Minworth (2)
64. Sutton Wylde Green (1)
65. Tyseley & Hay Mills (1)
66. Ward End (1)
67. Weoley & Selly Oak (2)
68. Yardley East (1)
69. Yardley West & Stechford (1)

=== Coventry ===
Wards from 1 April 1974 (first election 10 May 1973) to 1 May 1980:

Wards from 1 May 1980 to 10 June 2004:

Wards from 10 June 2004 to 7 May 2026:

1. Bablake (3)
2. Binley & Willenhall (3)
3. Cheylesmore (3)
4. Earlsdon (3)
5. Foleshill (3)
6. Henley (3)
7. Holbrook (3)
8. Longford (3)
9. Lower Stoke (3)
10. Radford (3)
11. St Michael's (3)
12. Sherbourne (3)
13. Upper Stoke (3)
14. Wainbody (3)
15. Westwood (3)
16. Whoberley (3)
17. Woodlands (3)
18. Wyken (3)

Wards from 7 May 2026 to present:

1. Bablake (3)
2. Binley & Willenhall (3)
3. Cheylesmore (3)
4. Earlsdon (3)
5. Foleshill (3)
6. Henley (3)
7. Holbrook (3)
8. Longford (3)
9. Lower Stoke (3)
10. Radford (3)
11. Sherbourne (3)
12. St Michael's (3)
13. Tile Hill and Canley (3)
14. Upper Stoke (3)
15. Wainbody (3)
16. Whoberley (3)
17. Woodlands (3)
18. Wyken (3)

=== Dudley ===
Wards from 1 April 1974 (first election 10 May 1973) to 6 May 1982:

1. Dudley: Brierley Hill (3)
2. Dudley: Quarry Bank (3)
3. Dudley: St James (3)
4. Dudley: Sedgley (3)
5. Dudley: Wordsley (3)
6. Dudley: Brockmoor & Pensnett (3)
7. Dudley: Castle & St Thomas (3)
8. Dudley: Coseley East (3)
9. Dudley: Coseley West (3)
10. Dudley: Gornal (3)
11. Dudley: Kingswinford & Wall Heath (3)
12. Dudley: Netherton & Woodside (3)
13. Dudley: Priory (3)
14. Dudley: St Andrews (3)
15. Halesowen: North (3)
16. Halesowen: Belle Vale & Cradley (3)
17. Halesowen: Central & Lapal (3)
18. Halesowen: Hasbury & Hayley Green (3)
19. Stourbridge: Amblecote & Wollaston (3)
20. Stourbridge: Lye & Wollescote (3)
21. Stourbridge: Norton & West (3)
22. Stourbridge: Pedmore & East (3)

Wards from 6 May 1982 to 10 June 2004:

1. Amblecote (3)
2. Belle Vale & Hasbury (3)
3. Brierley Hill (3)
4. Brockmoor & Pensnett (3)
5. Castle & Priory (3)
6. Coseley East (3)
7. Coseley West (3)
8. Gornal (3)
9. Halesowen North (3)
10. Halesowen South (3)
11. Hayley Green (3)
12. Kingswinford North & Wall Heath (3)
13. Kingswinford South (3)
14. Lye & Wollescote (3)
15. Netherton & Woodside (3)
16. Norton (3)
17. Pedmore & Stourbridge East (3)
18. Quarry Bank & Cradley (3)
19. Sedgley (3)
20. St. Andrews (3)
21. St. James (3)
22. St. Thomas (3)
23. Wollaston & Stourbridge West (3)
24. Wordsley (3)

Wards from 10 June 2004 to present:

1. Amblecote (3)
2. Belle Vale (3)
3. Brierley Hill (3)
4. Brockmoor & Pensnett (3)
5. Castle & Priory (3)
6. Coseley Eastv (3)
7. Cradley & Foxcote (3); renamed Cradley & Wollescote in 2011
8. Gornal (3)
9. Halesowen North (3)
10. Halesowen South (3)
11. Hayley Green & Cradley South (3)
12. Kingswinford North & Wall Heath (3)
13. Kingswinford South (3)
14. Lye & Wollescote (3); renamed Lye & Stourbridge North in 2011
15. Netherton, Woodside & St Andrews (3)
16. Norton (3)
17. Pedmore & Stourbridge East (3)
18. Quarry Bank & Dudley Wood (3)
19. St James's (3)
20. St Thomas's (3)
21. Sedgley (3)
22. Upper Gornal & Woodsetton (3)
23. Wollaston & Stourbridge Town (3)
24. Wordsley (3)

=== Sandwell ===
Wards from 1 April 1974 (first election 10 May 1973) to 3 May 1979:

Wards from 3 May 1979 to 10 June 2004:

Wards from 10 June 2004 to 7 May 2026:

1. Abbey (3)
2. Blackheath (3)
3. Bristnall (3)
4. Charlemont with Grove Vale (3)
5. Cradley Heath & Old Hill (3)
6. Friar Park (3)
7. Great Barr with Yew Tree (3)
8. Great Bridge (3)
9. Greets Green & Lyng (3)
10. Hateley Heath (3)
11. Langley (3)
12. Newton (3)
13. Oldbury (3)
14. Old Warley (3)
15. Princes End (3)
16. Rowley (3)
17. St Pauls (3)
18. Smethwick (3)
19. Soho & Victoria (3)
20. Tipton Green (3)
21. Tividale (3)
22. Wednesbury North (3)
23. Wednesbury South (3)
24. West Bromwich Central (3)

Wards from 7 May 2026 to present:

1. Bearwood (3)
2. Blackheath (3)
3. Bristnall (3)
4. Charlemont with Grove Vale (3)
5. Cradley Heath & Old Hill (3)
6. Friar Park & Stone Cross (3)
7. Great Barr & Yew Tree (3)
8. Great Bridge (3)
9. Greets Green & Lyng (3)
10. Hateley Heath (3)
11. Hill Top (3)
12. Langley (3)
13. Newton & Valley (3)
14. Old Warley (3)
15. Oldbury (3)
16. Princes End (3)
17. Rowley (3)
18. Smethwick (3)
19. Soho & Victoria (3)
20. St Pauls (3)
21. Tipton Green (3)
22. Tividale (3)
23. Wednesbury (3)
24. West Bromwich Central (3)

=== Solihull ===
Wards from 1 April 1974 (first election 10 May 1973) to 3 May 1979:

Wards from 3 May 1979 to 10 June 2004:

Wards from 10 June 2004 to 7 May 2026:

1. Bickenhill (3)
2. Blythe (3)
3. Castle Bromwich (3)
4. Chelmsley Wood (3)
5. Dorridge & Hockley Heath (3)
6. Elmdon (3)
7. Kingshurst & Fordbridge (3)
8. Knowle (3)
9. Lyndon (3)
10. Meriden (3)
11. Olton (3)
12. St Alphege (3)
13. Shirley East (3)
14. Shirley South (3)
15. Shirley West (3)
16. Silhill (3)
17. Smith’s Wood (3)

Wards from 7 May 2026 to present:

1. Balsall & Berkswell (3)
2. Blythe (3)
3. Castle Bromwich (3)
4. Chelmsley Wood (3)
5. Dorridge & Hockley Heath (3)
6. Elmdon (3)
7. Fordbridge (3)
8. Kingshurst & Smith’s Wood (3)
9. Knowle (3)
10. Lyndon (3)
11. Meriden & Arden (3)
12. Olton (3)
13. Shirley East & Sharmans Cross (3)
14. Shirley South (3)
15. Shirley West (3)
16. Silhill (3)
17. St Alphege with Monkspath & Hillfield (3)

=== Walsall ===
Wards from 1 April 1974 (first election 10 May 1973) to 1 May 1980:

Wards from 1 May 1980 to 10 June 2004:

Wards from 10 June 2004 to 7 May 2026:

1. Aldridge Central & South (3)
2. Aldridge North & Walsall Wood (3)
3. Bentley & Darlaston North (3)
4. Birchills Leamore (3)
5. Blakenall (3)
6. Bloxwich East (3)
7. Bloxwich West (3)
8. Brownhills (3)
9. Darlaston South (3)
10. Paddock (3)
11. Palfrey (3)
12. Pelsall (3)
13. Pheasey Park Farm (3)
14. Pleck (3)
15. Rushall–Shelfield (3)
16. St Matthew's (3)
17. Short Heath (3)
18. Streetly (3)
19. Willenhall North (3)
20. Willenhall South (3)

Wards from 7 May 2026 to present:

1. Aldridge Central & South (3)
2. Aldridge North & Walsall Wood (3)
3. Beechdale, Leamore & Reedswood (3)
4. Bentley & Darlaston North (3)
5. Bloxwich East & Blakenall Heath (3)
6. Bloxwich West (3)
7. Brownhills (3)
8. Darlaston South (3)
9. Harden, Goscote & Ryecroft (3)
10. New Invention (3)
11. Paddock (3)
12. Palfrey & The Delves (3)
13. Pelsall (3)
14. Pheasey Park Farm (3)
15. Pleck (3)
16. Rushall–Shelfield (3)
17. Short Heath (3)
18. St Matthew's (3)
19. Streetly (3)
20. Willenhall (3)

=== Wolverhampton ===
Wards from 1 April 1974 (first election 10 May 1973) to 6 May 1982:

Wards from 6 May 1982 to 10 June 2004:

Wards from 10 June 2004 to 4 May 2023:

1. Bilston East (3)
2. Bilston North (3)
3. Blakenhall (3)
4. Bushbury North (3)
5. Bushbury South & Low Hill (3)
6. East Park (3)
7. Ettingshall (3)
8. Fallings Park (3)
9. Graiseley (3)
10. Heath Town (3)
11. Merry Hill (3)
12. Oxley (3)
13. Park (3)
14. Penn (3)
15. St Peter's (3)
16. Spring Vale (3)
17. Tettenhall Regis (3)
18. Tettenhall Wightwick (3)
19. Wednesfield North (3)
20. Wednesfield South (3)

Wards from 4 May 2023 to present:

1. Bilston North (3)
2. Bilston South (3)
3. Blakenhall (3)
4. Bushbury North (3)
5. Bushbury South & Low Hill (3)
6. East Park (3)
7. Ettingshall North (3)
8. Ettingshall South & Spring Vale (3)
9. Fallings Park (3)
10. Graiseley (3)
11. Heath Town (3)
12. Merry Hill (3)
13. Oxley (3)
14. Park (3)
15. Penn (3)
16. St Peters (3)
17. Tettenhall Regis (3)
18. Tettenhall Wightwick (3)
19. Wednesfield North (3)
20. Wednesfield South (3)

== Former county council ==
=== West Midlands ===
Electoral Divisions from 1 April 1974 (first election 12 April 1973) to 1 April 1986 (county abolished):

1. Acocks Green (1)
2. Aldridge Brownhills No. 1 (1)
3. Aldridge Brownhills No. 2 (1)
4. Aldridge Brownhills No. 3 (1)
5. All Saints (1)
6. Aston (1)
7. Billesley (1)
8. Brandwood (1)
9. Coventry No. 1 (3)
10. Coventry No. 2 (3)
11. Coventry No. 3 (3)
12. Coventry No. 4 (3)
13. Deritend (1)
14. Duddeston (1)
15. Dudley No. 1 (1)
16. Dudley No. 2 (1)
17. Dudley No. 3 (1)
18. Dudley No. 4 (1)
19. Dudley No. 5 (1)
20. Dudley No. 6 (1)
21. Dudley No. 7 (1)
22. Edgbaston (1)
23. Erdington (1)
24. Fox Hollies (1)
25. Gravelly Hill (1)
26. Halesowen No. 1 (1)
27. Halesowen No. 2 (1)
28. Hall Green (1)
29. Handsworth (1)
30. Harborne (1)
31. Kings Norton (1)
32. Kingstanding (1)
33. Ladywood (1)
34. Longbridge (1)
35. Meriden No. 1 (1)
36. Meriden No. 2 (1)
37. Meriden No. 3 (1)
38. Moseley (1)
39. Newtown (1)
40. Northfield (1)
41. Oscott (1)
42. Perry Barr (1)
43. Quinton (1)
44. Rotton Park (1)
45. Saltley (1)
46. Sandwell (1)
47. Selly Oak (1)
48. Shard End (1)
49. Sheldon (1)
50. Small Heath (1)
51. Soho (1)
52. Solihull No. 1 (1)
53. Solihull No. 2 (1)
54. Solihull No. 3 (1)
55. Solihull No. 4 (1)
56. Sparkbrook (1)
57. Sparkhill (1)
58. Stechford (1)
59. Stockland Green (1)
60. Stourbridge No. 1 (1)
61. Stourbridge No. 2 (1)
62. Sutton Coldfield No. 1 (1)
63. Sutton Coldfield No. 2 (1)
64. Sutton Coldfield No. 3 (1)
65. Walsall No. 1 (1)
66. Walsall No. 2 (1)
67. Walsall No. 3 (1)
68. Walsall No. 4 (1)
69. Walsall No. 5 (1)
70. Walsall No. 6 (1)
71. Walsall No. 7 (1)
72. Warley No. 1 (1)
73. Warley No. 2 (1)
74. Warley No. 3 (1)
75. Warley No. 4 (1)
76. Warley No. 5 (1)
77. Warley No. 6 (1)
78. Washwood Heath (1)
79. Weoley (1)
80. West Bromwich No. 1 (1)
81. West Bromwich No. 2 (1)
82. West Bromwich No. 3 (1)
83. West Bromwich No. 4 (1)
84. West Bromwich No. 5 (1)
85. West Bromwich No. 6 (1)
86. Wolverhampton No. 1 (1)
87. Wolverhampton No. 2 (1)
88. Wolverhampton No. 3 (1)
89. Wolverhampton No. 4 (1)
90. Wolverhampton No. 5 (1)
91. Wolverhampton No. 6 (1)
92. Wolverhampton No. 7 (1)
93. Wolverhampton No. 8 (1)
94. Wolverhampton No. 9 (1)
95. Wolverhampton No. 10 (1)
96. Yardley (1)

Electoral Divisions due from 2 May 1985 (order revoked by the Local Government Act 1985):

1. Abbey & Old Warley (1)
2. Acock's Green (1)
3. Aldridge & Walsall Wood (1)
4. Allesley Park (1)
5. Amblecote, Quarry Bank & Cradley (1)
6. Aston (1)
7. Bartley Green (1)
8. Bentley & Darlaston (1)
9. Bickenhill & Meriden (1)
10. Billesley (1)
11. Bilston (1)
12. Birchills Leamore & Pleck (1)
13. Blackheath, Cradley Heath & Old Hill (1)
14. Blakenall & Bloxwich East (1)
15. Blakenhall & Spring Vale (1)
16. Bloxwich West & Willenhall North (1)
17. Bournville (1)
18. Brandwood (1)
19. Brownhills & Pelsall (1)
20. Bushbury & Oxley (1)
21. Caludon (1)
22. Cannon Park (1)
23. Castle Bromwich (1)
24. Charlemont & Newton (1)
25. Charterhouse (1)
26. Chelmsley Wood (1)
27. Coseley East, Castle & Priory (1)
28. Daimler (1)
29. Edgbaston (1)
30. Elmdon & Lyndon (1)
31. Erdington (1)
32. Ernesford (1)
33. Ettingshall & East Park (1)
34. Fox Hollies (1)
35. Gornal & Pensnett (1)
36. Graiseley & Park (1)
37. Great Barr & Friar Park (1)
38. Great Bridge, Greets Green & Lyng (1)
39. Halesowen East (1)
40. Halesowen West (1)
41. Hall Green (1)
42. Handsworth (1)
43. Harborne (1)
44. Hearsall (1)
45. Heath Town & St Peter's (1)
46. Hereward (1)
47. Hodge Hill (1)
48. Humber (1)
49. Jaguar (1)
50. King's Norton (1)
51. Kingsbury (1)
52. Kingstanding (1)
53. Kingswinford & Wall Heath (1)
54. Knowle & Packwood (1)
55. Ladywood (1)
56. Langley & Oldbury (1)
57. Longbridge (1)
58. Low Hill & Fallings Park (1)
59. Merry Hill & Penn (1)
60. Morris (1)
61. Moseley (1)
62. Nechells (1)
63. Netherton & St Andrews (1)
64. Northfield (1)
65. Olton & Silhill (1)
66. Oscott (1)
67. Paddock & Hatherton Rushall (1)
68. Perry Barr (1)
69. Pheasey & Streetly (1)
70. Quinton (1)
71. Rowley & Tividale (1)
72. Sandwell (1)
73. Sedgley & Coseley West (1)
74. Selly Oak (1)
75. Shard End (1)
76. Sheldon (1)
77. Shirley South & West (1)
78. Short Heath & Willenhall South (1)
79. Small Heath (1)
80. Smethwick & Bristnall (1)
81. Soho (1)
82. Sparkbrook (1)
83. Sparkhill (1)
84. St Alphege & Shirley East (1)
85. St James's & St Thomas's (1)
86. St Matthew's & Palfrey (1)
87. St Pauls, Soho & Victoria (1)
88. Stockland Green (1)
89. Stourbridge East (1)
90. Stourbridge West (1)
91. Sutton Four Oaks (1)
92. Sutton New Hall (1)
93. Sutton Vesey (1)
94. Tettenhall (1)
95. Tipton (1)
96. Washwood Heath (1)
97. Wednesbury (1)
98. Wednesfield (1)
99. Weoley (1)
100. West Bromwich Central & Hateley Heath (1)
101. Whittle (1)
102. Wordsley & Brierley Hill (1)
103. Yardley (1)

== Electoral wards by constituency ==
Wards as they existed on 1 December 2020.

=== Aldridge-Brownhills ===
Walsall: Aldridge Central & South; Aldridge North & Walsall Wood; Brownhills; Paddock (polling districts UE & UF); Pelsall; Pheasey Park Farm; Rushall-Shelfield; Streetly.

=== Birmingham Edgbaston ===
Birmingham: Bartley Green; Edgbaston; Harborne; North Edgbaston; Quinton.

=== Birmingham Erdington ===
Bimringham: Castle Vale; Erdington; Gravelly Hill; Kingstanding; Oscott (polling districts OSC4, OSC5, OSC7 & OSC8); Perry Common; Pype Hayes; Stockland Green.

=== Birmingham Hall Green and Moseley ===
Birmingham: Brandwood & King’s Heath (polling districts BKH1HG, BKH2HG & BKH3); Hall Green North; Hall Green South; Moseley; Sparkbrook & Balsall Heath East; Sparkhill.

=== Birmingham Hodge Hill and Solihull North ===
Birmingham: Bromford & Hodge Hill; Garretts Green; Glebe Farm & Tile Cross; Heartlands; Shard End; Ward End.

Solihull: Castle Bromwich; Smith’s Wood.

=== Birmingham Ladywood ===
Birmingham: Alum Rock; Balsall Heath West; Bordesley & Highgate; Bordesley Green; Ladywood; Nechells; Newtown; Soho & Jewellery Quarter.

=== Birmingham Northfield ===
Birmingham: Allens Cross; Frankley Great Park; King’s Norton North; King’s Norton South; Longbridge & West Heath; Northfield; Rubery & Rednal; Weoley & Selly Oak (polling districts WSO1ED, WSO4, WSO6, WSO7, WSO8, WSO9 & WSO10).

=== Birmingham Perry Barr ===
Birmingham: Aston; Birchfield; Handsworth; Handsworth Wood; Holyhead; Lozells; Oscott (polling districts OSC1, OSC2, OSC3 & OSC6); Perry Barr.

=== Birmingham Selly Oak ===
Birmingham: Billesley; Bournbrook & Selly Park; Bournville & Cotteridge; Brandwood & King’s Heath (polling districts BKH4, BKH5 & BKH6); Druids Heath & Monyhull; Highter’s Heath; Stirchley; Weoley & Selly Oak (polling districts WSO2SO, WSO3SO & WSO5SO).

=== Birmingham Yardley ===
Birmingham: Acocks Green; Sheldon; Small Heath; South Yardley; Tyseley & Hay Mills; Yardley East; Yardley West & Stechford.

=== Coventry East ===
Coventry: Binley & Willenhall; Foleshill; Henley; Longford; Upper Stoke; Wyken.

=== Coventry North West ===
Coventry: Bablake; Holbrook; Radford; Sherbourne; Whoberley; Woodlands.

=== Coventry South ===
Coventry: Cheylesmore; Earlsdon; Lower Stoke; St. Michael’s; Wainbody; Westwood.

=== Dudley ===
Dudley: Brockmoor & Pensnett; Castle & Priory; Gornal; St. James’s; St. Thomas’s; Sedgley; Upper Gornal & Woodsetton.

=== Halesowen ===
Dudley: Belle Vale; Cradley & Wollescote; Halesowen North; Halesowen South; Hayley Green & Cradley South; Quarry Bank & Dudley Wood.

Sandwell: Blackheath (polling district BLG); Cradley Heath & Old Hill.

=== Kingswinford and South Staffordshire (part) ===
Dudley: Kingswinford North & Wall Heath; Kingswinford South; Wordsley.

=== Meriden and Solihull East ===
Solihull: Bickenhill; Chelmsley Wood; Dorridge & Hockley Heath; Elmdon; Kingshurst & Fordbridge; Knowle; Meriden; Silhill.

=== Smethwick ===
Sandwell: Abbey; Blackheath (polling districts BLA, BLB, BLC, BLD, BLE, BLF & BLH); Bristnall; Langley; Old Warley; St. Pauls; Smethwick; Soho & Victoria.

=== Solihull West and Shirley ===
Solihull: Blythe; Lyndon; Olton; St. Alphege; Shirley East; Shirley South; Shirley West.

=== Stourbridge ===
Dudley: Amblecote; Brierley Hill; Lye & Stourbridge North; Netherton, Woodside & St. Andrews; Norton; Pedmore & Stourbridge East; Wollaston & Stourbridge Town.

=== Sutton Coldfield ===
Birmingham: Sutton Four Oaks; Sutton Mere Green; Sutton Reddicap; Sutton Roughley; Sutton Trinity; Sutton Vesey; Sutton Walmley & Minworth; Sutton Wylde Green.

=== Tipton and Wednesbury ===
Dudley: Coseley East.

Sandwell: Friar Park; Great Bridge; Hateley Heath; Princes End; Tipton Green; Wednesbury North; Wednesbury South.

=== Walsall and Bloxwich ===
Walsall: Birchills Leamore; Blakenall; Bloxwich East; Bloxwich West; Paddock (polling districts UA, UB, UC & UD); Palfrey; Pleck; St. Matthew’s.

=== West Bromwich ===
Sandwell: Charlemont with Grove Vale; Great Barr with Yew Tree; Greets Green & Lyng; Newton; Oldbury; Rowley; Tividale; West Bromwich Central.

=== Wolverhampton North East ===
Walsall: Short Heath; Willenhall North.

Wolverhampton: Bushbury North; Bushbury South & Low Hill; Fallings Park; Heath Town; Wednesfield North; Wednesfield South.

=== Wolverhampton South East ===
Walsall: Bentley & Darlaston North; Darlaston South; Willenhall South.

Wolverhampton: Bilston East; Bilston North; East Park; Ettingshall; Spring Vale.

=== Wolverhampton West ===
Wolverhampton: Blakenhall; Graiseley; Merry Hill; Oxley; Park; Penn; St. Peter’s; Tettenhall Regis; Tettenhall Wightwick.

== See also ==
- List of parliamentary constituencies in the West Midlands (county)
