= Bromford =

Area of Birmingham, England

Coordinates: 52.5069°N 1.8316°W

- Location within the West Midlands
- OS grid reference: SP115897
- Metropolitan borough: Birmingham
- Metropolitan county: West Midlands
- Region: West Midlands
- Country: England
- Sovereign state: United Kingdom
- Post town: BIRMINGHAM
- Postcode district: B36
- Dialling code: 0121
- Police: West Midlands
- Fire: West Midlands
- Ambulance: West Midlands
- UK Parliament: Birmingham Hodge Hill and Solihull North

Bromford, referred to locally as "the Bromford", is an industrial and residential area of Birmingham, between Ward End, Alum Rock, Hodge Hill, Washwood Heath, Shard End, Stechford, Castle Bromwich and Tyburn. The industrial area is predominantly on the north side of the M6 motorway, including The Bromford Gate industrial park, Fort Shopping Park, and Fort Dunlop, with one industrial site sitting east of the M6 called Bromford Central. The residential area sits adjacent to the East of the M6 comprising two neighbourhoods, Bromford (formally referred to as Bromford Bridge) built along Bromford Drive, and The Firs built along Chipperfield Road. The industrial and residential areas have increasingly become two separate distinguishable places, and not recognised locally as joined or one. This is signified by the M6 & River Tame dividing the two areas, poor public transport links between the two areas, and the areas sitting within three different local authority wards (industrial being split between Gravelly Hill and Pype Hayes, and the residential within Bromford & Hodge Hill), and two parliamentary constituencies (industrial area within Birmingham Erdington and residential area within Birmingham Hodge Hill and Solihull North.

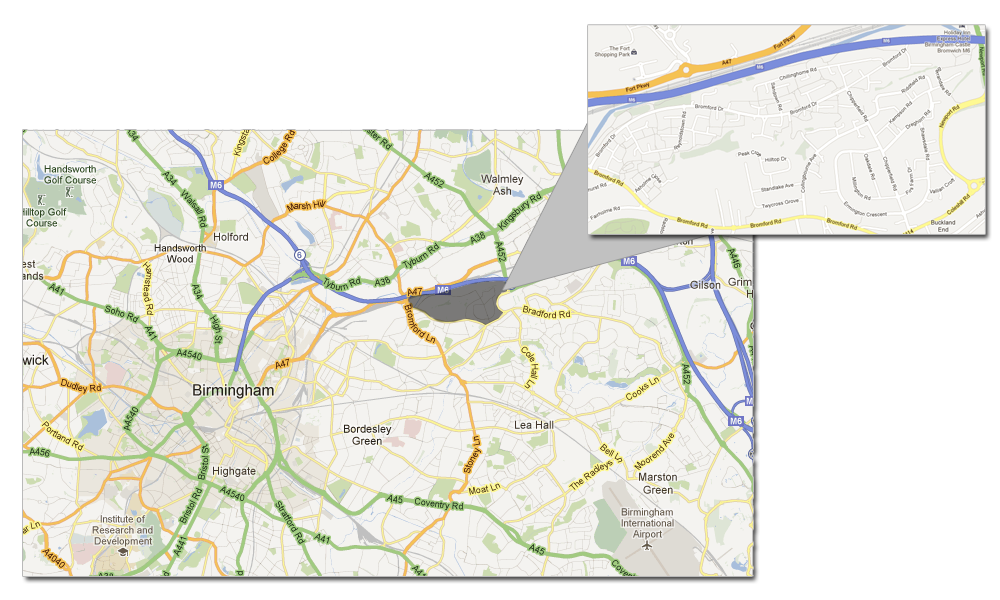
Bromford Location.

== Toponymy ==
In Old English, "Bromford" means "broom ford", signifying abundance of broom shrubs (or similar hard-wearing plants) and a location to cross the River Tame.

In the United Kingdom Census of 1841 the area was named as "Bromfield", however the exact location is uncertain.

== History ==
Bromford has historically been associated with two main features – the river crossing (a bridge in the area was first documented in 1317) and a mill. Bromford Mill, serving nearby Erdington, was first recorded in the Domesday Book in 1086 and was a corn mill. At around 1600, it was converted to an iron mill – the last of Birmingham's mills to do so. In the Ordnance Survey map of 1864, the mill was annotated as Bromyard Forge; its use had changed from iron milling to paper milling and finally to wire drawing and steel rolling at approximately 1850. The production of steel continued in the surrounding area until the late 20th century.

The area covered by the Firs and Bromford Estates was originally farmland. With the growth of urbanization before the War (1939–1945) the process of ribbon development took place at the southern end of Chipperfield Road. at this point the remainder of the Firs Estate area remained farmland, except for the part that was developed into a golf course, the Club House is on the site of the current Comet Hotel. While this transformation was taking place on the Firs Estate, the present Bromford Estate was being developed into the Birmingham Racecourse.

At this time, both areas came under the Parish of Castle Bromwich Church, and this link is still evident today as the Firs' Royal British Legion still use this church as their church of worship and remembrance. To this day, many people living in the area of the Firs and Bromford Estates state their address as Castle Bromwich.

With the need for housing after the war, the area of the Firs Estate was developed by the City Council in the 1950s. This mainly consisted of three-story flats, high rise flats and terrace housing on a high-density level.

The increasing need for housing was the reason for the closure of Birmingham Racecourse in 1965 and the building of the Bromford Estate, which was finalised in 1966. This estate was planned on the New Town principle, containing high and low rise flats, terrace housing, and included and built within these plans were housing for Co-ownership and Private housing.

The two Estates are not, strictly speaking, distinguishable from each other, although they are easily identifiable as a joint entity by a glance at a map of the area. Local residents make a clear distinction, however between the older Firs Estate and the more recent Bromford.

An estimate of the population based on the latest Census Data would put the population at something over 10,000 in an area of about three-quarters of a square mile. There are some 1,000 households on the Firs Estate, 2,000 on the Bromford Estates, and perhaps a further 800 households in the area of older 1930s housing which lies between the post-war estates.

In 2009 Firs and Bromford was awarded Big Local, a National Lottery investment of £1 million into 150 areas across England. Big Local is an exciting opportunity for residents in 150 areas around England to use at least £1m each to make a massive and lasting positive difference to their communities. Big Local brings together all the local talent, ambitions, skills and energy from individuals, groups and organisations who want to make their area an even better place to live. In 2011 Firs and Bromford Neighbours Together , a 100% resident-led partnership, was established to oversee Big Local in Firs and Bromford. The partnership is committed and passionate to make Firs and Bromford an even better place to live for all.

== Transport ==
Bromford lies on the River Tame, and is adjacent to the Birmingham and Fazeley Canal. Bromford Bridge railway station served the area between 1898 and 1965, closing when Bromford Bridge Racecourse ceased to operate. Since this closure there is no longer a nearby train station serving Bromford. Closest stations are Stechford (1.5 miles away), Erdington (2 miles away), or Gravelly Hill (1.5 miles away).

National Express West Midlands run a number of bus services through Firs and Bromford (the residential area). Including the X12 and X13 services and also the 26 service, which run services between Bromford & Erdington & Ward End, The Fox & Goose Shopping Centre. The Number 11 bus service runs on the edge of the Bromford estate and through Bromford industrial area, but no longer serves the Fort Shopping Park. There are also bus services which run from the top of Chipperfield Road via the Coleshill Road, as well as bus services from Berrandale Gardens when walking off the Bromford & Firs Estates.

The M6 motorway cuts through Bromford. The Gravelly Hill Interchange (known as "Spaghetti Junction") is approximately 1.5 miles (2.4 km) west of Bromford.

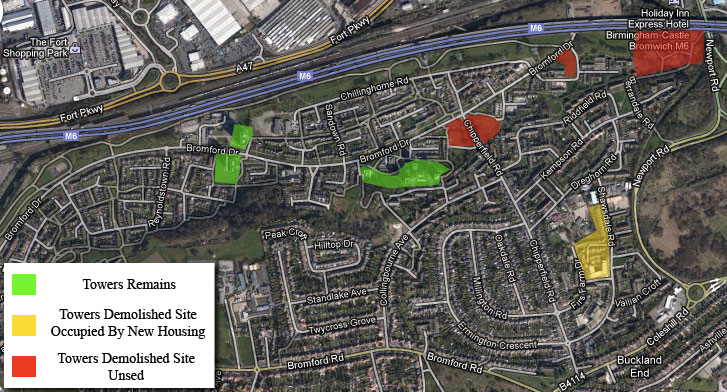
Bromford Tower Site.
