= Joe Simpson (artist) =

English painter

- Born: Joseph Patrick Simpson; 4 May 1984 (age 42); Lancaster, England
- Education: B.A., University of Leeds,
- Known for: Photorealistic painter, visual artist,
- Website: Official website

Joe Simpson (born 4 May 1984) is an English figurative painter based in London. His work is influenced by cinematography to create frozen scenes detached from a wider context. His work has been shown internationally, including in the National Portrait Gallery, The Royal Albert Hall, House of Commons, Air Gallery, The Hospital (Covent Gardens) and Manchester Art Gallery.

In 2009 Simpson’s first major exhibition ‘Almost There’ launched. Simpson collaborated with twelve bands and solo artists (including The Miserable Rich, Nizlopi, The Voluntary Butler Scheme, New Cassettes and Jose Vanders) to create a series of paintings that have an accompanying original soundtrack. Each painting had a song written specifically for that piece, inspired by the scene and composed to complement the mood of the image. The paintings were exhibited with headphones beside them, so that you could simultaneously listen to the music and view the image. The visual and audio components come together to create one new piece of art.

In 2011 Simpson produced a series of portraits of famous musicians, with subject including Brandon Flowers, Mark Ronson, Ezra Koenig (Vampire Weekend), Maxi Jazz (Faithless), Paloma Faith, Matt Berninger (The National), Sam Beam (Iron & Wine) and Jamie Cullum. The exhibition launched in a pop up in Soho and then was displayed as a solo exhibition at The Royal Albert Hall. Simpson's portrait of Maxi Jazz (Faithless) was shortlisted for the BP Portrait Award and exhibited at The National Portrait Gallery.

His next major series of paintings was titled 'Across America' and depicted scenes from the artist's trip in the United States. The paintings were exhibited at Reuben Colley Fine Arts in Birmingham in 2013.

From 2014 to 2022, Simpson worked on a project entitled 'Act', where he painted a series of British actors in their dream role. He asked each actor what role they had always wanted to play, and he then created a narrative painting depicting them playing that part. The roles could be from scripts that never got made, or characters from novels or plays that they would love to embody, or any other interpretation of the question. For this series, he painted Paddy Considine, Warwick Davis, Michael Sheen, Olivia Colman, Eleanor Tomlinson, Gugu Mbatha-Raw, Mark Gatiss, John Simm, Charlie Cox and Matt Lucas.

Oil on Canvas 2007
