= Washwood Heath Academy =

Location
- Burney Lane; Birmingham, West Midlands, B8 2AS; England; 52°29′25″N 1°49′09″W

Information
- Type: Academy
- Established: 1967
- Department for Education URN: 139888 Tables
- Ofsted: Reports
- Head Teacher: Lynn Petrie
- Gender: Mixed
- Age: 4 to 19
- Enrolment: 1,621
- Houses: Plaza Tolkien; Chamberlain; Farah; Harewood; Simmonds; Seacole Moeen Ali
- Website: https://washwood.academy/

Washwood Heath Academy is an all through school located in the Washwood Heath ward of Birmingham, England. Originally known as Washwood Heath Comprehensive School, it opened in September 1967. It was extended in 1996 to make way for the Post-16 centre. The school became a specialist Technology College and was renamed Washwood Heath Technology College.

In 2013 Washwood Heath Technology College was converted into an academy and renamed Washwood Heath Academy.

David Harewood, an ex-pupil, made a documentary about turning a group of Washwood Heath pupils into Shakespearean actors in five days.

== Controversy ==
- In 1996, maths teacher Israr Khan interrupted a Christmas carol rehearsal performance, questioning the involvement of Muslim pupils professing to Christian theology in the festive songs.
- In 2002, the school became the first in Britain to have its entire governing body sacked under new government powers after an 18-month row over race and religion created internal disagreements amongst staff. The board were replaced by a council team and subsequently received praise from Ofsted.
- In 2010, following a General Teaching Council disciplinary hearing, teacher Jasbir Dhillon was suspended for three months for being late for class on 21 occasions. Action was taken after pupils complained about his punctuality.
- In 2025, the school went through a crisis where kids went to schools such as Hodge Hill College and attack students. this was called the Red v Blue school wars which led to 2 students being injured one which needed extra medical help.

== Alumni ==
- Terry Cooke, professional footballer
- Stephen Duffy, singer songwriter
- David Harewood, television and film actor
- Lee Hendrie, professional footballer
- Jason Kavanagh professional footballer
- Jason White, professional footballer
- Rashid Rauf, alleged Al-Qaeda operative
- Carl Saunders, footballer
- Ian Taylor, professional footballer
