= Bescot Yard =

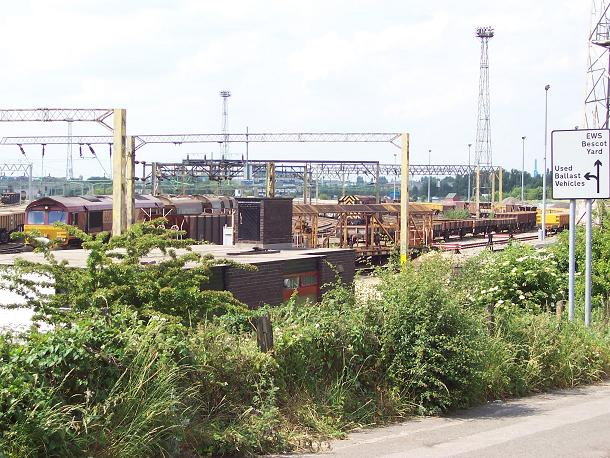
- DB Schenker Class 66, next to Network Rail infrastructure vehicles, at Bescot in June 2005
- Interactive map of Bescot Yard

Location
- Location: Bescot, Walsall, England
- Coordinates: 52.5597°N 1.9862°W

Characteristics
- Operator: DB Cargo UK

Bescot Yard is a railway yard in Bescot, a suburb of Walsall in the West Midlands, operated by DB Cargo UK. The yard is the major freight yard of the region, handling all of the rail freight movements and most of the railfreight traffic around the West Midlands.

== History ==
Bescot is on the Chase Line between Birmingham New Street and Walsall, part of the former Grand Junction Railway, opened in 1837. It was built to handle the coal and industrial traffic associated with the West Midlands. In April 1966, a remodelled Bescot Yard was opened which was capable of handling over 4,000 wagons daily.

Traffic from the West Midlands Domestic Coal network was diverted away from Bescot to Washwood Heath sidings in July 1987. This allowed for extra capacity at Bescot.

Bescot TMD is to the north-west of the yard. This entire complex of track is clearly visible from the northern end of the M6 and M5 motorway junction.

== Present ==
After closure of the 1950s-developed hump shunting yard, freight declined significantly during the Great Recession, and the associated Bescot TMD now carries no allocation of locomotives. Washwood Heath sidings were closed to freight trains in the latter half of 2008 and all residual services were transferred back to Bescot yard.

DB Schenker services workings are still the mainstay of operations in the area, Direct Rail Services nuclear flask trains pass once or twice a week, and Freightliner Group Intermodal and Automotive trains also pass through. Regular Freightliner Coal trains also ran around on the up goods on their way to Rugeley Power Station prior to the closure of the power station in 2016.

The yard can be viewed in operation from Bescot Stadium railway station, served by West Midlands Railway.

== Gallery ==
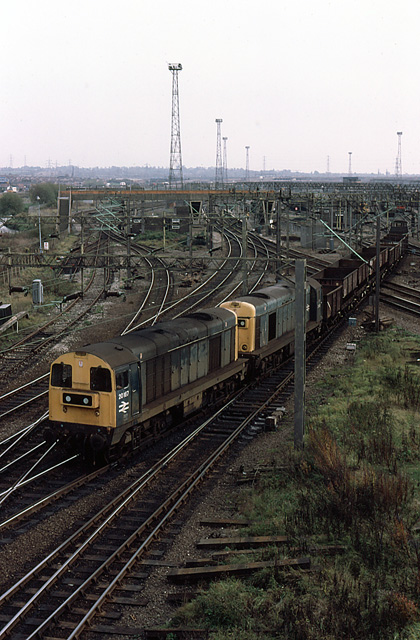
British Railways Class 20 No.s 20167 and 20162 take the line to Walsall, Hednesford and Rugeley from Bescot with a short train of empty coal wagons, November 1982

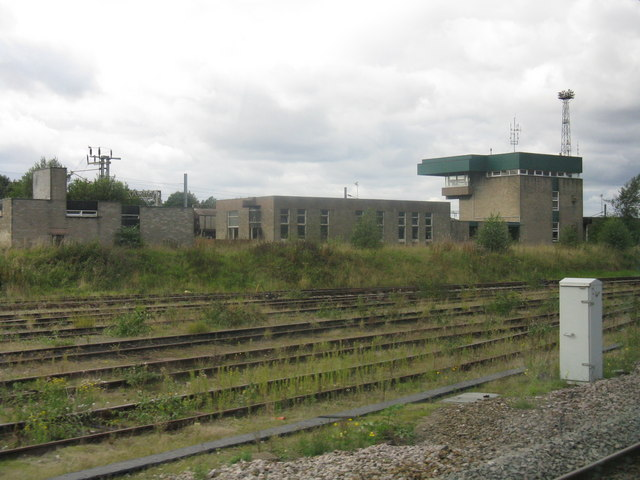
Bescot's former hump shunting control offices ably illustrate the run-down state of the yard in September 2008

== See also ==
- List of rail yards
- Rail transport in Great Britain
