= Eden Boys' Leadership Academy, Birmingham East =

Eden Boys Leadership Academy, Birmingham East

Location
- 441 Alum Rock Road, Saltley, Birmingham; Alum Rock; Birmingham, West Midlands, B8 3DT; England; 52°29′15″N 1°50′29″W

Information
- Type: Academy
- Religious affiliation: Islam
- Established: 2018
- Local authority: Birmingham City Council
- Trust: Star Academies Trust
- Department for Education URN: 145878 Tables
- Ofsted: Reports
- Regional Executive: Asiyah Ravat
- Principal: Akhmed Hussain
- Gender: Male only
- Age: 11 to 16
- Enrolment: 614
- Website: www.edenboysbirminghameast.com

Eden Boys Leadership Academy Birmingham East, also known as Eden Boys Leadership Academy locally or abbreviated to EBLA B'ham East, is a secondary school located in the Saltley area of Birmingham, West Midlands, England.

== History ==
Eden Boys’ Leadership Academy, Birmingham East was purpose-built on the former site of a Smith & Nephew medical products facility in the Alum Rock area of Birmingham. Construction was led by Wates Construction, with contributions Broxap for outdoor infrastructure, including cycle shelters, benches, and litter bins. The new campus features a three-storey teaching block, modern science labs, a sports hall, prayer and ablution facilities, and outdoor sports areas including a full-size pitch and a multi-use games area.

Initially, the school operated from a temporary site before moving into its permanent home at 441 Alum Rock Road in 2021. In January 2023, the school received an "Outstanding" rating from the regulator Ofsted in every category.

== Mission ==
Its mission is:

To promote a culture of educational excellence, from within a caring and secure Islamic environment enriched with the values of discipline, mutual care and respect, which extends beyond the school into the wider community.

— Eden Boys

== School profile ==
Eden Boys’ Leadership Academy, Birmingham East is part of the Star Academies trust. The school primarily serves communities in Alum Rock, Saltley, and surrounding East Birmingham wards. It admits approximately 120 pupils per year and has a total capacity of 800 students.

The academy received an Ofsted rating of "Outstanding" in all categories in January 2023, under the leadership of Principal Akhmed Hussain
