= Washwood Heath depot =

Railway depot in the West Midlands, England

Washwood Heath
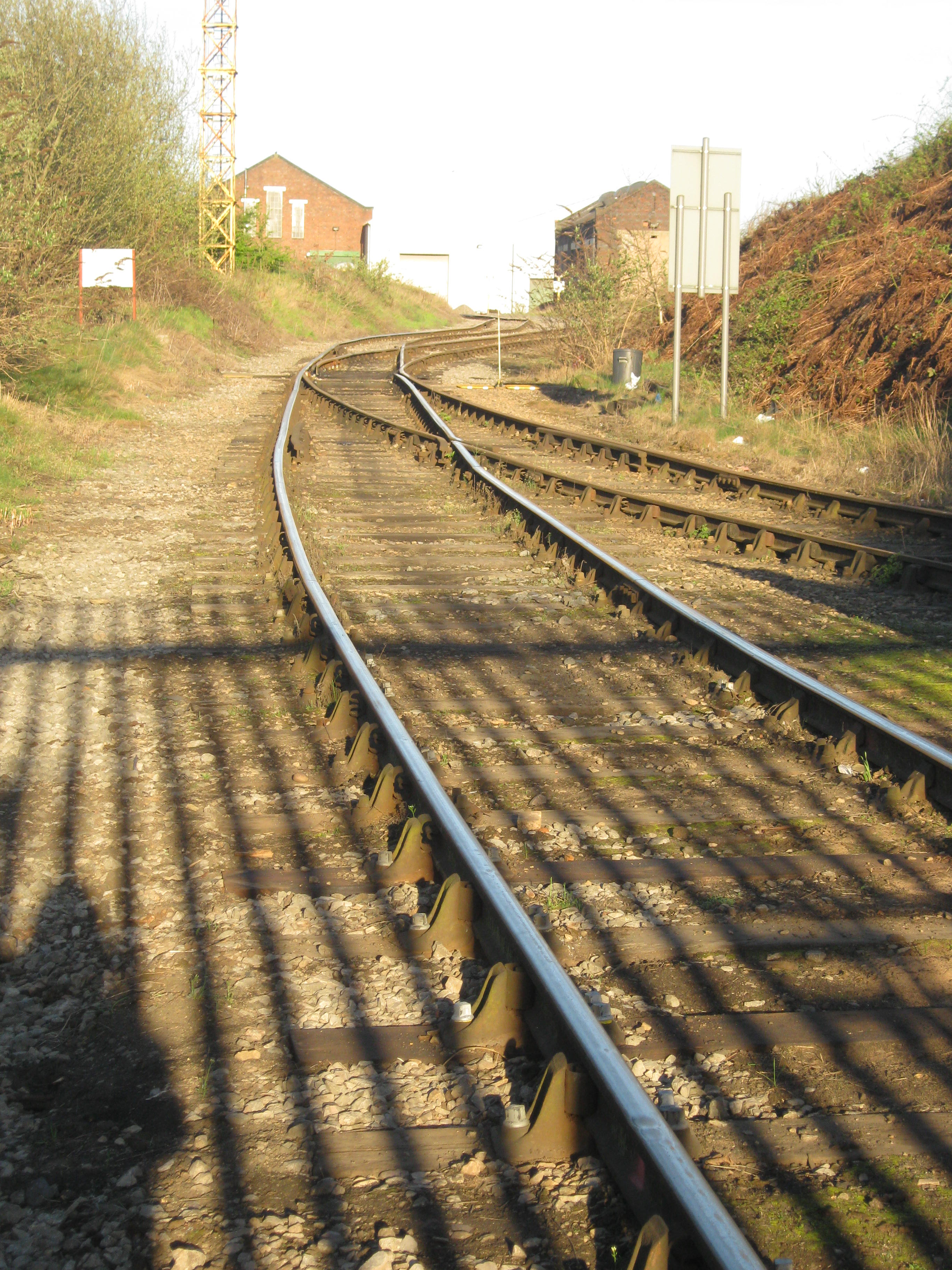
- Carriage Works Sidings, Washwood Heath, where the depot will be built
- Interactive map of Washwood Heath

Location
- Location: Washwood Heath, West Midlands, England
- Coordinates: 52.5000°N 1.8509°W

Characteristics
- Owner: HS2 Ltd
- Type: EMU storage and maintenance facility
- Roads: 14
- Routes served: HS2

Washwood Heath depot is a planned depot in Washwood Heath, Birmingham for High Speed 2 (HS2), a high-speed railway line under construction in the United Kingdom. Planning permission for the 14 road site was granted in early 2023.

== History ==
Part of the site was previously occupied by factories for LDV Group and Wolseley Motors. Manufacturing ceased in 2009.

It was also previously occupied by the Washwood Heath Railway Works, which was later used by Metro-Cammell and last used by Alstom. The land was acquired along with other properties by St. Modwen Properties from Alstom in 2002, who leased it back to companies including Alstom and Network Rail. The 50-acre (20-hectare) was sold to the government in December 2016 for an undisclosed amount. The Railway Works was cleared in 2019.

The site was identified as the favoured location for a depot by HS2 in 2011.

In 2018, a row of houses and a motor workshop on Common Lane were compulsorily purchased. In February 2021, HS2 began seeking bids for an estimated £275 million contract to build the depot. In early 2023, Birmingham City Council gave planning permission to build the site.

In May 2026, HS2 signed the contract for the depot with a joint venture of Taylor Woodrow and Aureos, at a cost of £856 million.

== Infrastructure ==
The site is expected to have 14 sidings, a maintenance building which will cover 40,000 square metres (430,000 sq ft), and network control centre (the NICC - Network Integrated Control Centre).

== Usage ==
The site will contain a rolling stock maintenance depot, storage area, control centre, and facilities for drivers and cleaning staff. It will be the only depot for the project.

== See also ==
- Washwood Heath Yard, nearby former railway yard
