= Thornton Road poltergeist claim =

1981 Birmingham mystery of stone-throwing, investigated as poltergeist activity

Coordinates: 52.49°N 1.83°W

The Thornton Road Poltergeist refers to stone-throwing incidents in a residential area of Birmingham, England, in 1981 and the subsequent police investigation.

== History ==
In 1981, Ward End residents at Thornton Road told police they could not locate the source of stones being thrown that were causing significant damage to windows and roof tiles. Chief Inspector Len Turley investigated, saying his team went to great lengths to catch the individual or individuals responsible. Officers camped outside overnight and reportedly employed night sights, image intensifiers and automatic cameras, but failed to find the source of the stone throwing, prompting some writers to ascribe the incident to a poltergeist.

Police later speculated that the stones may have been launched 200 yards (180 m) from the houses using a home-made catapult.

== Literature ==
- Fairley, John & Welfare Simon 1984: Arthur C. Clarke's World of Strange Powers pages 31–34. ISBN 0-00-216679-8.
- Time Life Books 1989: Mind Over Matter pages 53–54. ISBN 0-8094-6336-9.
