= Alum Rock, Birmingham =

Coordinates: 52.486944°N 1.831944°W

Alum Rock
- Ward
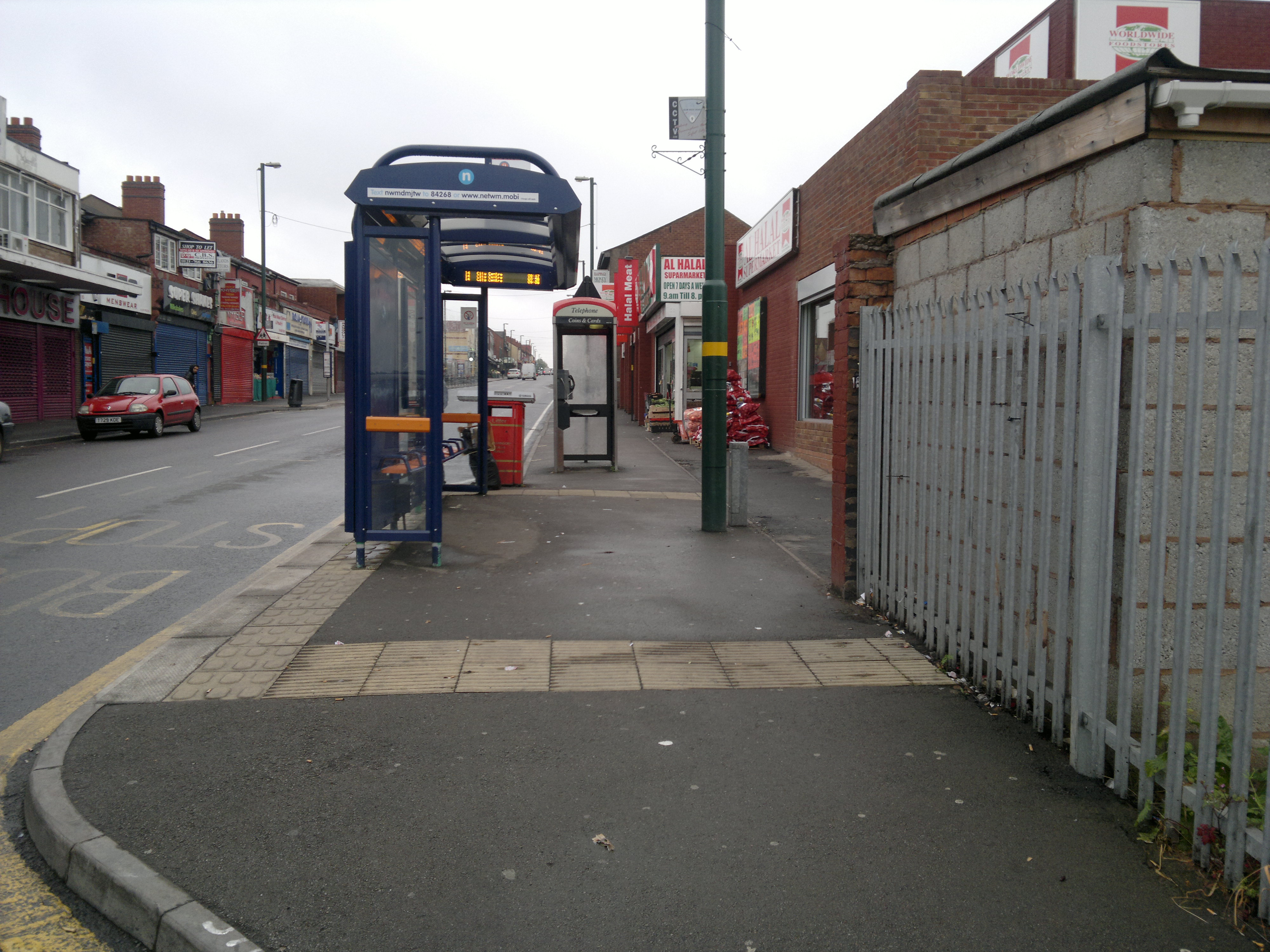
- Alum Rock centre

- Location within the West Midlands
- Metropolitan borough: Birmingham
- Metropolitan county: West Midlands
- Region: West Midlands
- Country: England
- Sovereign state: United Kingdom
- Post town: Birmingham
- Postcode district: B8
- Dialling code: 0121
- Police: West Midlands
- Fire: West Midlands
- Ambulance: West Midlands
- UK Parliament: Birmingham Hodge Hill
- Councillors: Mohammed Idrees (Labour); Mariam Khan (Labour)

Alum Rock is an inner-city suburb of Birmingham, England, located roughly 2 miles (3.2 km) east of Birmingham city centre. The area is officially a division of Saltley. Before 1974, it was in northwestern Warwickshire, near to the border with Worcestershire.

== Toponymy ==
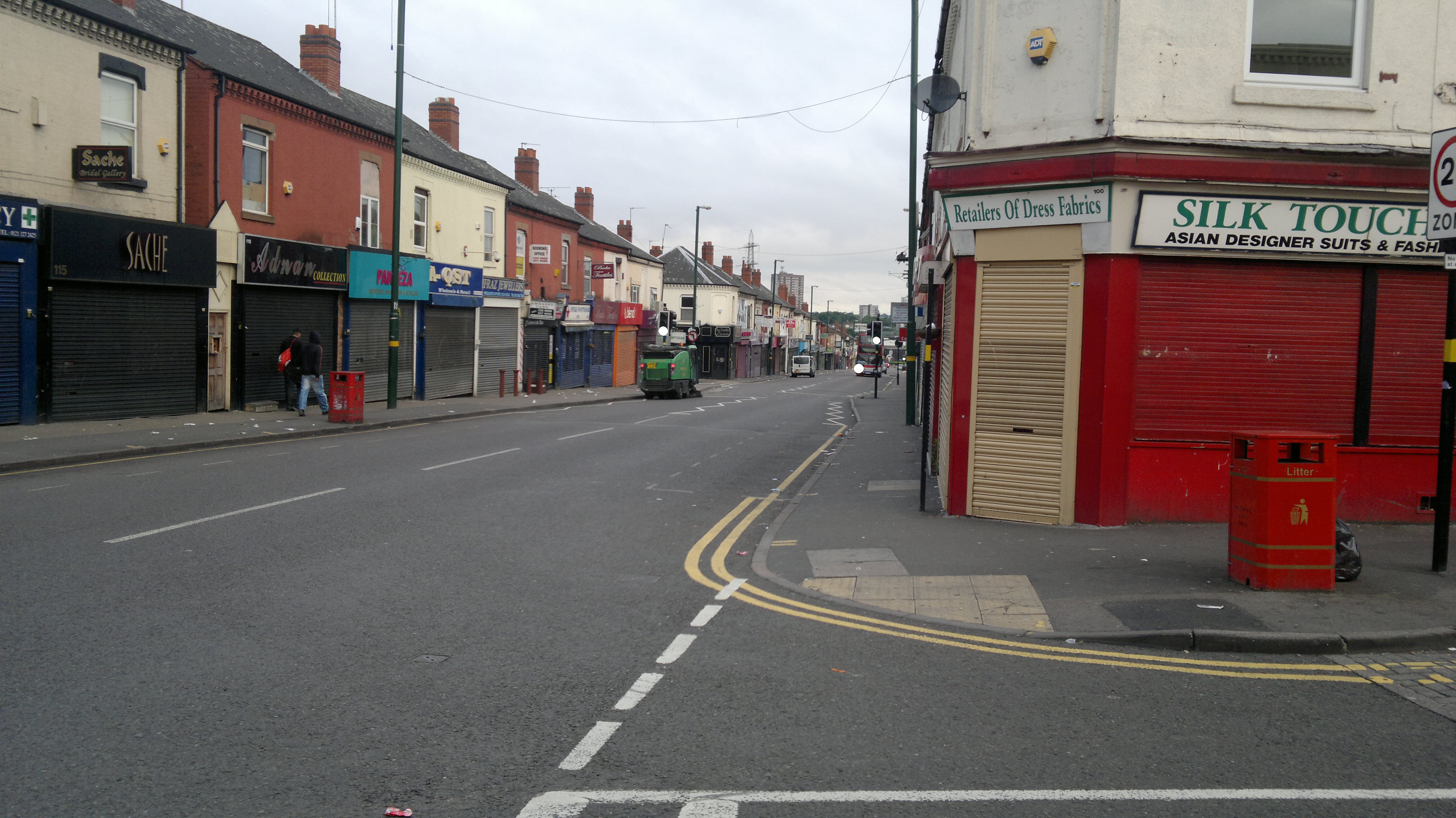
Alum Rock Road

The name probably refers to the rock from which the mineral salt called alum (potassium aluminium sulphate) is extracted and used in the tanning of leather as well as other processes. The area was being referred to as Alom Rock in 1718. This suggests a large quantity of this rock somewhere there.

== Geography ==
Alum Rock includes the connecting streets of the 3 km Alum Rock Road beginning at Saltley Gate and ending at Railway Bridge. Once through the main shopping area, Alum Rock Road continues towards Stechford, passing through Pelham, before joining Washwood Heath Road at the Fox & Goose the eastern part of the main road is in Ward End.

The area locally known as "The Rock" starts at Saltley Gate and ends at the junction with Highfield Road and Bowyer Road.

Alum Rock covers most of Saltley and so runs into many of Saltley's neighbouring areas, Bordesley Green to the south, Ward End to the north and east and Nechells to the west.

Washwood Heath Road, which also begins at Saltley Gate, runs loosely parallel to Alum Rock Road for a mile, before both main roads join up in front of the Fox & Goose.

== Governance and politics ==
Until 2018, Alum Rock was part of the Washwood Heath ward. Following boundary changes in 2018 the area is now included in eponymous Alum Rock ward. Alum Rock ward is served by two Independent councillors; Nosheen Khalid and Shaukat Mahmood, both elected in the 2026 Birmingham City Council elections.

== Culture and community ==
The Saltley Gate Peace Group is an organisation based in Alum Rock, taking its name from the local roundabout which leads to the area's main shopping area, Alum Rock road.

== Landmarks ==
Brookhill Tavern is a grade II listed former pub on Alum Rock Road.

== Education ==
- Primary Schools
  - Shaw Hill Primary School: An outstanding-rated state school serving ages 3–11.
  - Parkfield Community School: An outstanding-rated academy for children aged 3–11.
  - Nansen Primary School: A state primary school for ages 3–11.
  - Ward End Primary School: A state school serving children aged 3–11.
  - St Cuthbert’s RC Junior and Infant School: A Catholic state school for ages 3–11.
  - Thornton Primary School: A state school specifically for ages 7–11.
  - Sladefield Infant School: A state school for younger primary children aged 4–7.
  - Alston Primary School: An academy serving children aged 3–11.
  - Highfield Junior and Infant School: A state school for ages 4–11.
  - The Rosary Catholic Primary School: A Catholic state primary for ages 3–11.
  - Wyndcliffe Primary School: Located nearby in Bordesley Green, serving ages 3–11.
  - Cromwell Junior and Infant School: Situated approximately 0.5 miles from Alum Rock.
  - Hamd House School: An independent primary and secondary school for ages 5–16. Nurseries
  - Adderley Nursery School: A local authority-maintained nursery for children aged 2–4.
  - Highfield Nursery School: A maintained nursery school located on Highfield Road.
  - Hamd House Nursery (Alum Rock Branch): Provides early education with a focus on Islamic foundations.
  - Laugh 'n' Learn Day Nursery: Located on Alum Rock Road, serving children from 0 months to 5 years.
  - Havelock House Day Nursery: A private nursery facility on Highfield Road.
  - Al-Madina Nursery (Alum Rock Road): A registered childcare provider in the area.
  - The Village Community Nursery: Located at St Peter's Urban Village in Alum Rock.
  - Bright Star Day Nursery: Situated nearby on Washwood Heath Road.
  - Little Angels Day Nursery: Located on Washwood Heath Road. All-Through and Secondary Schools (with Primary/Nursery Intake)
  - Washwood Heath Academy: An all-through academy serving children from age 4 to 18.
  - Waverley School: An all-through state school for ages 4–19.
  - Eden Boys' Leadership Academy, Birmingham East: A secondary academy (ages 11–18) located directly on Alum Rock Road.
  - Rockwood Academy: A secondary school on Naseby Road for ages 11-16.

== Notable people ==
Stephen Duffy, singer-songwriter and founding member of Duran Duran, was born and brought up in Alum Rock.
