= Washwood Heath Yard =

Disused railway yard in England

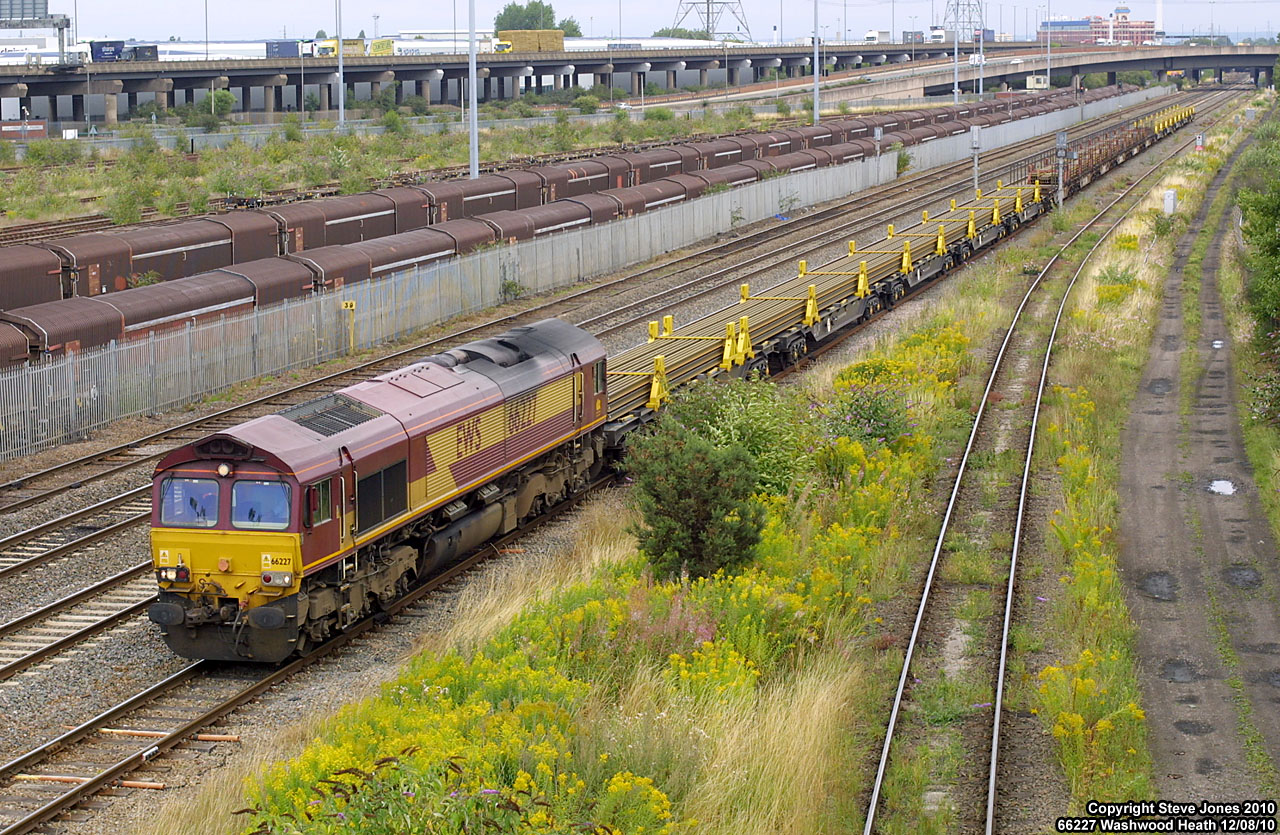
- 66227 passing Washwood Heath - rows of KSA wagons are shown in the yard. (Note: KSA wagons were built by Rautaruukki of Finland in 1995, specifically for moving automotive body parts between Swindon and Longbridge. When that traffic ended, some were stored at Washwood Heath, others were converted to carry timber traffic.)
- Interactive map of Washwood Heath Yard

Location
- Location: Washwood Heath, Birmingham, England
- Coordinates: 52.5038°N 1.8415°W
- OS grid: SP108895

Characteristics
- Owner: Network Rail
- Operator: DB Cargo UK
- Type: Freight
- Routes served: Sutton Park Line (to Bescot); Camp Hill Line (to the south); Birmingham to Peterborough Line (to the east); Chiltern Main Line (to the south); Cross Country Route (to Derby)

History
- Opened: 1900
- Closed: 1982 (as a hump yard); 2008 as a flat-shunted yard/sidings
- Pre-grouping: Midland Railway
- Post-grouping: London Midland Scottish
- BR region: London Midland

Washwood Heath Yard was a marshalling yard, and later sidings, to the east of Birmingham, in the West Midlands, England. The site was first host to sidings in the late 1870s, which were upgraded to a hump marshalling yard by 1900 which survived until the early 1980s. Thereafter, the site was flat shunted, but moreover used as a layover yard, rather than used for the transfer or interchange of wagons between trains. It was run-down and closed in late 2008 due to the loss of most of the automotive traffic that it was latterly used for. The lines were removed by 2020.

== History ==
Sidings at Washwood Heath on the Birmingham to Derby route were first installed in October 1877, but the hump yards were opened in 1900, with most lines being commissioned in September. In the early days, the sidings were clustered around the down lines (those going towards Birmingham), but the sidings in use up until the 21st century, were located on the up lines (towards Derby). These were opened in 1918 and expanded in 1930. Whilst the yard at Bescot retained a greater importance for freight traffic under British Rail after electrification of the West Coast Main Line in 1966, and the Rugby–Birmingham–Stafford line in 1967, the hump yard at Washwood Heath was still busy as a location for wagonload traffic, handling some 18,384 wagons over the year in 1967 (an average of 50 wagons per day). (Note: At the same time, Bescot was handling an average of 40 wagons per day, however, the West Midlands had several yards which dealt with wagonload traffic; Coventry, Hednesford, Stourbridge, and Langley Green.)

Wagonload traffic was also handled at Lawley Street (to the west) and Water Orton (to the east), so much so, that the combined efforts of these three yards aligned on a short space of track handled more traffic than the hump yards at Toton and March Whitemoor. However, in the 1960s, Bescot was designated as the wagonload hub in the West Midlands (one of twelve UK wide), which saw Washwood Heath removed as a wagonload shunting location, but wagons were still tripped from Washwood Heath to Bescot for sorting.

During the merry-go-round (MGR) period on British Railways, when coal was forwarded to power stations in dedicated wagons (such as HAAs), the sidings at Washwood Heath were used as a staging post for trains between the coal mines in the Midlands and further afield, and the power station at Didcot. Domestic coal was also forwarded across the Midlands area to Shrewsbury, Gobowen, and even as far as the North-West of England throughout the 1980s. The intense MGR workings to and from Didcot prompted a proposal to electrify the route between Washwood Heath and Didcot via Banbury and Oxford, however this was not carried through due to the logistics of transferring between diesel and electric power at either end of the journey. The intent of the MGR cycle was to make the delivery of coal to power station as simple as possible, but services such as those to Ironbridge Power Station operated from Washwood Heath in the late 1970s/early 1980s were complicated by the need to reverse into and out of Washwood Heath when not being used. These services were re-routed to use Bescot, eliminating the reversal at Washwood Heath.

Washwood Heath also became the staging post for automotive traffic carried on the railway from the 1970s until 2008. Several locations within the West Midlands generated rail-borne traffic in terms of finished cars for delivery/export, or inwards deliveries of parts and windscreens. Major flows included body parts from Swindon to Longbridge for Rover, Rover cars out from Longbridge, Jaguar Land Rover vehicles out from Solihull and Heartlands (Castle Bromwich). The yard was remodelled in the 1990s with the building of the A47 on the northern side, and in anticipation of gaining Channel Tunnel traffic, high-security fencing was installed around the same time.

The loss of the automotive traffic that the yard was latterly almost completely dedicated to led to it being rundown and closed in late 2008.

In January 2020, Tarmac opened a new aggregates and asphalt facility on the site of the old up sidings, leaving just one line on serving the new terminal.

== See also ==
- List of rail yards
- Rail transport in Great Britain
- Washwood Heath depot, HS2 depot nearby
