= Alum Rock (ward) =

Electoral ward in Birmingham, England

- Population: 27,164
- Metropolitan borough: City of Birmingham
- Metropolitan county: West Midlands
- Region: West Midlands
- Country: England
- Sovereign state: United Kingdom
- UK Parliament: Birmingham Hodge Hill
- Councillors: Mohammed Idrees (Labour); Mariam Khan (Labour)

Alum Rock is an electoral ward of Birmingham City Council in the east of Birmingham, West Midlands, covering an urban area to the east of the city centre.

The ward was created in 2018 as a result of boundary changes that saw the number of wards in Birmingham increase from 40 to 69.

== Boundaries ==
The ward was largely created from the former Washwood Heath ward and is contained within the Birmingham Hodge Hill constituency. The seat includes the historic area of Saltley.

== Profile ==
The ward is largely composed of late-Victorian and Edwardian terrace housing which runs the length of the Alum Rock Road and the roads off it. The area is notable for a high ethnic minority population many of whom can trace their origins to 20th century migrants from South Asia.

=== Demographics ===
As of 2024, Alum Rock has a population of 28,014 and is the most populous ward of Birmingham. It is also one of the most deprived wards, with an unemployment rate of 66%.

The ethnic makeup of the area is found to be composed:

- Bangladeshi – 7%
- Chinese – 0.2%
- Indian – 1.2%
- Pakistani – 60.1%
- Black African – 8.0%
- Black Caribbean – 1.5%
- Mixed – 2.1%
- White – 6.4%
- Other – 6.0%

== Councillors ==
Election	Councillor	Councillor
2018	Mohammed Idrees (Lab)	Mariam Khan (Lab)

== Elections since 2018 ==
Alum Rock 2018 (2)
Party	Candidate	Votes	%	±%
Labour	Mohammed Idrees	4,910	85.3	
Labour	Mariam Khan	4,464	77.6	
Liberal Democrats	Thomas Lister	296	5.1	
Conservative	Richard Brookes-Bland	215	3.7	
Conservative	Amil Khan	214	3.7	
Liberal Democrats	Colin Ross	187	3.2	
Majority		4,168		
Turnout		5,755		
Labour win (new seat)				
Labour win (new seat)				
