= Bromford Bridge Racecourse =

Defunct horse racing venue in England

Coordinates: 52°30′21″N 1°49′15″W

Bromford Bridge
- The Birmingham Racecourse Company logo
- Interactive map of Bromford Bridge
- Location: Bromford, Birmingham, England
- Owned by: Birmingham Racecourse Company
- Date opened: 1895
- Date closed: 1965
- Notable races: The City of Birmingham Cup

Bromford Bridge Racecourse was a horse racing course in the Bromford area of Birmingham, England. Its official name was 'Birmingham'. It staged flat and national hunt racing.

== History ==
The earliest recorded horse-race in Birmingham according to Chris Pitt and Chas Hammond took place in May 1747 but it is not known where that race took place. At various times racing took place at Smethwick, Handsworth, Sparkbrook, Hall Green and Four Oaks; but as Birmingham spread outwards the open ground needed for horse racing became scarcer. Bromford Bridge was an exception as it was well placed between the city and the countryside.

The Bromford Bridge racecourse was opened in 1894 by brothers John and Stanley Ford. The lease of the land (measuring 42 acres (17 ha)) was supported by a company owned by the Earl of Aylesford. The first recorded meeting was on Friday 14 June and Saturday 15 June 1895. The first race, the Midland Welter Handicap, over a mile and a quarter, was won by Philology owned by Mr G F Fawcett.

When the course was built it was out in the country, on the flat river meadows bordered by the River Tame to the north and the west, near the village of Castle Bromwich. Charles Richardson, writing in 'The English Turf' described the placing of the stands as: "The perfect model of what a racecourse ought to be. The racing, and in particular the finishes, can be better seen at Birmingham than at many places, and it may be added that the course is a good one."

A national hunt jockey, Bernard Wells, said that: "Birmingham was the class National Hunt meeting in the Midlands, Cheltenham excepted. The facilities were excellent, the racecourse stables were the best in England." The flat course had a straight mile, and Ruff's Guide to the Turf commented that: "After Newmarket it is undoubtedly the best straight course in the United Kingdom." The Easter Monday meeting was first held in 1896, and continued until the course was closed.

Bromford Bridge railway station was opened to serve the racecourse, and closed when the course closed. It was on the line between Birmingham New Street and Derby. It was open only on race days and did not appear in official timetables.

In May 1914, the grandstand was burnt down by members of the suffragette movement. Following this, the course was requisitioned by the military. During the Second World War, the racecourse was used initially as a barrage balloon and anti-aircraft gun site, later for billeting soldiers and as an army stores depot. Bombs caused damage to the course during the war, but by August 1946 the course was open again for a two day meeting at which Gordon Richards rode seven winners.

In 1949, the course was bought as freehold by the Birmingham Racecourse Company for £85,000.

In 1952 John Rickman wrote: "Birmingham is one of the best racecourses in the country. True, its surroundings cannot be compared with those of Goodwood or York, but if one keeps one's eye on the racing and considers the technical perfection of the track one should have no compaint whatsoever". Rickman continued: "Birmingham never lacks runners, and although many of its races are for second-class and moderate animals, there are a number of events during the nine meetings comprising fifteen days' racing held between Easter Monday and November, which cater for and attract high-class horses. The standard of prize money is high. There are four plates of £1,000 and four sweepstakes with £1,000 added. A feature is Birmingham's Monday racing, and meetings are held on Easter Monday and Whit Monday."

The course was redeveloped in 1958-59. A refreshment bar was constructed in the centre of the course, which at 334 feet was the longest continuous bar in the world. The same year, the course hosted its most valuable event – a 2.5 miles (20 furlongs) handicap with a first prize of approximately £2,500.

By the 1960s average attendances at Birmingham's race meetings had fallen to around 5,000. Racegoers seemed to prefer the more rural settings of Warwick, Worcester and Stratford to the industrial views of Fort Dunlop's Base Stores and Bromford Wire Mills. The racecourse management tried various things to boost attendances, including Saturday evening fixtures, free admission for ladies and performances by pop groups such as the Swinging Blue Jeans. Birmingham Corporation was keen to buy the 180 acres of the racecourse's site to build housing for people who had to move from inner city slum clearances, and in 1964 the racecourse shareholders accepted the council's offer of £1.25 million.

=== The final meeting ===
Birmingham's farewell meeting took place on Monday evening, 21 June 1965, starting at 7pm. The official race card was one shilling (5p). A crowd of 9,400 watched the six races. A total of 50 runners competed. 7pm Chesterton Apprentice Plate 1 mile. 1. Morris Dancer (6/5 fav) ridden by Terry Watson; 2. Desist (9/4) - P Graham; 3. Singing in the Rain (20/1) - A Skeoch. 7.30pm Warwickshire 2-y-o Plate 6 furlongs. 1. Golden Beige (9/1) - Brian Taylor; 2. Badedas (10/1) - C Moss; 3. Crocus (4/9 fav) - Lester Piggott. 8pm Letherby & Christopher Handicap Stakes £1,500 added 1 mile. 1. London Way (9/2) - Lester Piggott; 2. Free Boy (4/1 fav) - J Roe; 3. Fairmont (8/1) - D Letherby. 8.30pm Bromford Handicap Plate 5 furlongs. 1. Selly Oak (11/8 fav) - Lester Piggott; 2. Abbot's Quill - T Sturrock; 3. Gratel (3/1) - Brian Taylor. 9pm Henley-in-Arden Plate 1 mile. 1. Penisola (9/1) - Stan Clayton; 2. Red Hot (100/8) - Greville Starkey; 3. Bomby (3/1) - Lester Piggott. 9.30pm Farewell Plate 5 furlongs. 1. Welshman (11/2) - Greville Starkey; 2. Philistine (6/4 fav) - R P Elliott; 3. Peintre Bleu (25/1) - C Moss. A horse named Plantation finished last of the 12 runners in the final race at Birmingham on a cold, wet evening at Bromford Bridge. Lester Piggott had first ridden at Birmingham racecourse in 1948. Lord Willoughby de Broke handed the finishing post over to Birmingham City Council's house-building committee.

=== Redevelopment ===
By 1965, Birmingham Corporation had bought the land on which the racecourse stood for £1.25 million, with the intention of building a new housing estate on its site to rehouse people from inner city slum clearances.

The racecourse was demolished and the Castle Bromwich settlement was extended. The roads in the redevelopment were given names related to racing, including references to Newmarket, Reynoldstown, Haydock, and Thirsk. The winning post was re-sited next to a playground on Bromford Drive. The area used as the parade ring is still recognisable today although all railings and other furnishings are long gone.

== The course ==
Birmingham was a right-handed oval-shaped course of a little over one mile three furlongs, with a straight mile which joined the round course to form a home straight of four furlongs. One mile races were also run on the round course. The steeplechase course was on the inside of the flat course. There were eight fences, four in the back straight, including the water jump, and four in the home straight. Hurdle races were run on the flat course.
