= Fox & Goose =

Coordinates: 52.4935°N 1.8185°W

The Fox & Goose is a shopping district in Ward End, Birmingham, England, at the eastern end of Washwood Heath Road. It is named after the public house there. It also is the point where Ward End and Hodge Hill end and Stechford begins.

The Fox & Goose provides an alternate shopping area from nearby Alum Rock and includes Beaufort Park opposite it, which is also a shopping area.

Tesco Stores recently opened a new store in the area. Plans were first outlined in 2005, however, campaigns and objections by the residents saw the plans revised in September 2006. This included the reduction in land taken from Brockhurst playing fields (also known as the Met by locals as the land used to be owned by Metropolitan-Cammell), resulting in the reduction of the proposed store size and number of car parking spaces to be made available. Money paid under the Section 106, will fund an artificial turf pitch for Hodge Hill School and improvements to CCTV in the area.
