= Hodge Hill =

Area of Birmingham, England

Coordinates: 52.497°N 1.819°W

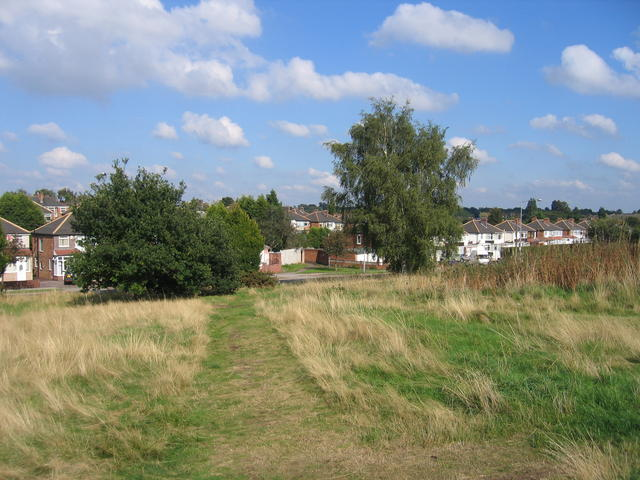
- Hodge Hill Common

- Location within the West Midlands
- Population: 28,026 (2011, ward)
  - Density: 48.2 per ha
- OS grid reference: SP130890
- Metropolitan borough: Birmingham
- Metropolitan county: West Midlands
- Region: West Midlands
- Country: England
- Sovereign state: United Kingdom
- Post town: Birmingham
- Postcode district: B34 & B36
- Dialling code: 0121
- Police: West Midlands
- Fire: West Midlands
- Ambulance: West Midlands
- UK Parliament: Birmingham Hodge Hill and Solihull North

Hodge Hill constituency shown within Birmingham

Hodge Hill is an area 4 mi (6.4 km) east of Birmingham city centre, England. It is also a council constituency, managed by its own district committee. The MP of Hodge Hill is currently Liam Byrne.

The constituency includes the smaller constituency ward and the wards of Bordesley Green, Shard End and Washwood Heath.

== Politics ==
Hodge Hill is in the larger Birmingham Hodge Hill and Solihull North constituency.

The Hodge Hill ward is currently represented by three councillors on Birmingham City Council. The ward has a Ward Support Officer.

== Geography ==
The boundaries of the Hodge Hill ward are defined by the M6 motorway to the north and A4040 outer circle to the west.

Hodge Hill Common and the Cole Valley, which are covered by the Kingfisher Country Park, are major areas of open space within the ward.

== Population ==
The 2001 census recorded 24,825 people living within the ward with a population density of 4,566 people per km^{2} compared with 3,649 people per km^{2} for Birmingham. Ethnic minorities represent 13.9% (3,442) of the ward's population as opposed to 29.6% for Birmingham in general.

== Transport ==
The B4114 Coleshill Road is the main road that separates the area. Stechford station on the Coventry to Birmingham New Street line, as well as occasional services to Walsall via Aston, serves the area.

Coleshill Road was the A47 before 1997, when the Heartlands Spine Road was completed.

== Facilities ==
The local library is Glebe Farm Library, which was the first library to be built in Birmingham after World War II. It was constructed out of pre-fabricated concrete sections and took one year to build. On 22 April 1952 it was opened to the public by Alderman Ralph Yates, then Lord Mayor of Birmingham. The Glebe Farm Local History Society gather at the library once every month.

Shopping facilities are mainly provided at the Fox & Goose; however, many travel to nearby Stechford to shop.

Primary schools in the area include Colebourne Primary School and Hodge Hill Primary School, while the main secondary schools serving the area are Hodge Hill College and Hodge Hill Girls' School. Special schools in Hodge Hill include Beaufort School and Braidwood School for The Deaf.

== Notable people ==
Norable people from Hodge Hill include:

- Reuben Colley, artist
- Dinita Gohil, actress
- Stefan Moore, footballer attended Hodge Hill College
- Luke Moore, footballer attended Hodge College
