= The Voluntary Butler Scheme =

Rob Jones
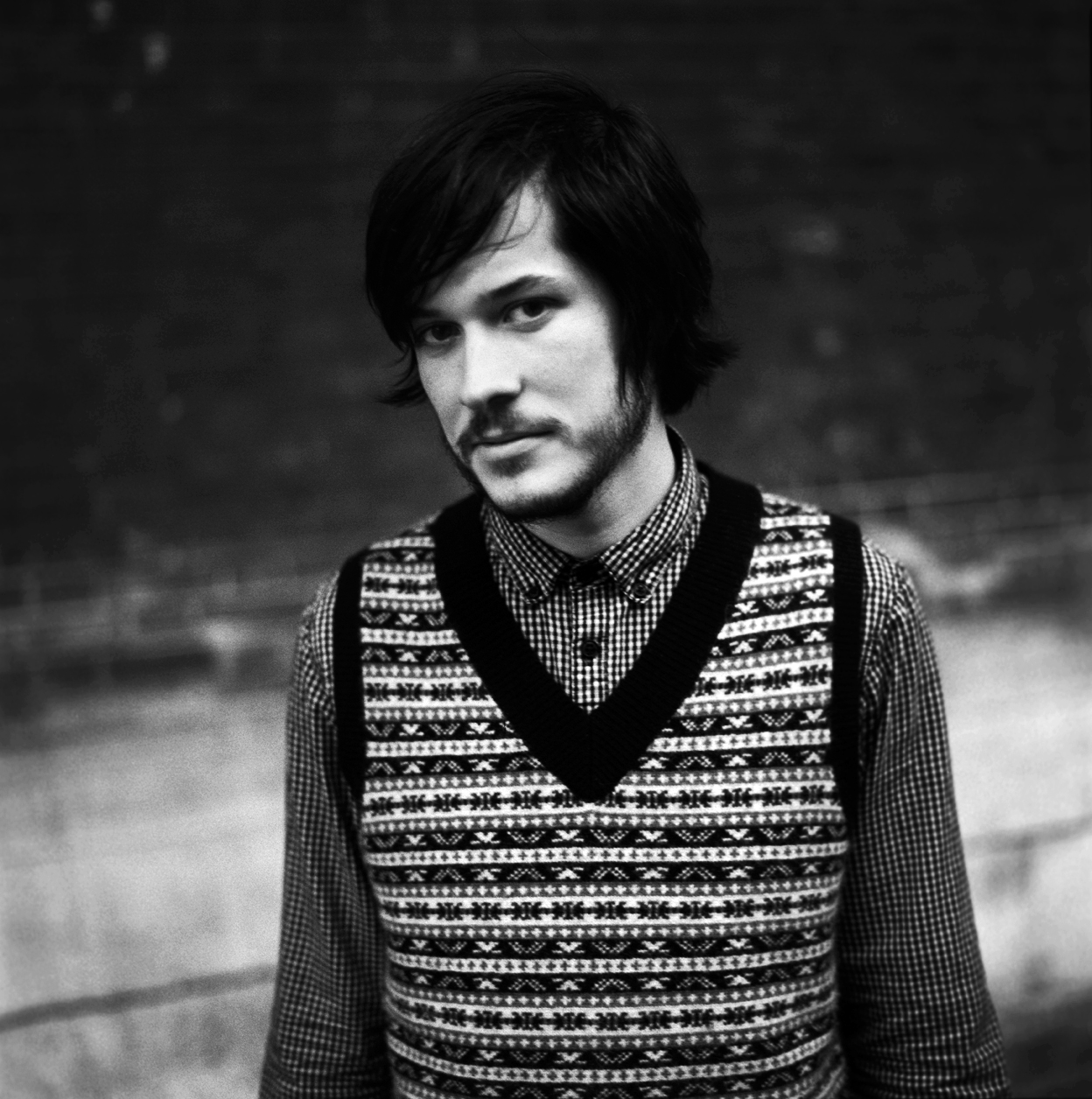
- The Voluntary Butler Scheme

Background information
- Born: 28 May 1985 (age 41); Stourbridge, England
- Genres: Indie pop, one man band
- Occupations: Singer, songwriter
- Instruments: Vocals, guitar, bass, percussion, drums, kazoo, ukulele, keyboard, synthesizer
- Label: Split Records

The Voluntary Butler Scheme (VBS) is the stage name for one-man band Rob Jones, based in Stourbridge near Birmingham. Jones records and produces the majority of his material by himself in a home studio in his bedroom. The VBS uses the technique of live looping at gigs, playing in parts on various instruments, such as a guitar, a guitar synthesizer, drums, a kazoo and a ukulele.

The debut album, At Breakfast, Dinner, Tea, was released on 7 September 2009 on Split Records. Singles from the album have been championed by the NME, BBC Radio 1, BBC Radio 2, BBC Radio 6 and XFM. The VBS has played sessions for Huw Stephens, Marc Riley, Dermot O'Leary and Jon Kennedy. Declared "one to watch" in publications as diverse as Q and The Sun, and Suggs declared himself a fan, stating in an interview that "they are a very good band".

== Biography ==
The Voluntary Butler Scheme came about in 2008, when a chance spotting on MySpace led to Rob Jones being asked to play a gig in Birmingham. He went ahead, playing six songs to a crowd of about 12, and subsequently decided that he no longer wanted to play with bands and that The VBS was the path he wished to follow.

Since 2008, The Voluntary Butler Scheme has toured with Duke Special, Joe Lean & the Jing Jang Jong, Brakes, Jason Lytle (Grandaddy) & Adam Green.

In July 2008 The Voluntary Butler Scheme did a session on the Dermot O'Leary's BBC Radio 2 show - performing "Trading Things In" and a cover of "Build Me Up Buttercup".

== Debut album ==
The Voluntary Butler Scheme's debut album, At Breakfast, Dinner, Tea, was recorded in a month-long stint at a studio in Stockwell, with producer Charlie Francis (known for his work with R.E.M. and the High Llamas) and a handful of guest musicians.

At Breakfast, Dinner, Tea has gained much attention because of its unusual and quirky lyrics. Q says, "The lyrics of longing about running shoes, coffee, MP3 players and turning vegetarian are clearly quite daft but utterly endearing". A BBC Music Review states that Jones "has a wicked line in witty lyrics", and The Daily Growl commends his "quaintly observational everyday lyrics". The line “wear a De La Soul t-shirt once in a while to make you feel more hip hop than you are” has even been put onto VBS merchandise T-shirts.

Rob states of his lyrics, "I think it's about not trying too hard... You know, I read something Phil Spector said in some sound magazine, about the recording of ‘Be My Baby’, and asking, 'Is it dumb enough? Are people gonna get it?' I'm not trying to make it dumb, but there's something in that - stuff feels so much more honest when it's simple." The single "Trading Things In" contains the lyric "yes we can listen to La Bamba on your mp3 player". Mexican folk song "La Bamba" is one of Rob's all time favourites, though he states, "I don't even know what the guy's singing about... it really doesn't matter. The way he sings it – it just breaks your heart. And I remember thinking, oh, I can probably just talk about whatever I've been up to that day and it'll work."

The song "Trading Things In" was used in Season 6, Episode 4, of Grey's Anatomy on 8 October 2009.

== Discography ==
=== Singles ===
- "Trading Things In" (2008)
- "Multiplayer" (2009)
- "Tabasco Sole" (2009)
- "Split"
- "Multiplayer"

=== Albums ===
- At Breakfast, Dinner, Tea (2009)
- The Grandad Galaxy (2011)
- A Million Ways To Make Gold (2014)
