= Glebe Farm and Tile Cross (ward) =

Electoral ward of Birmingham City Council

Glebe Farm and Tile Cross is an electoral ward of Birmingham City Council in the north of Birmingham, West Midlands.

== History ==
Under the 2023 Periodic Review of Westminster constituencies in the 2024 United Kingdom general election the ward became part of the Birmingham Hodge Hill and Solihull North constituency.

== Election results ==
The ward is currently represented by two councillors: Jess Ankrett of Reform UK, and Shehryay Kayani of the Workers Party.

=== 2026 Birmingham City Council election ===
Glebe Farm and Tile Cross 2026 (2)
Party	Candidate	Votes	%	±%
Reform	Jess Ankrett	1,394	31.3	new
Workers Party	Shehryar Kayani	1,163	26.1	new
Reform	Satnam Tank	1,157	26.0	new
Workers Party	Amir Shafique	1,078	24.2	new
Labour	Marje Bridle	1,035	23.2	▼40.2
Labour	John Cotton	896	20.1	▼37.9
Green	Gary Charles	654	14.7	▲ new
Green	Gareth Hooper	569	12.8	▲ new
Conservative	Chris Fikeis	252	5.7	▼13.4
Independent	Faisal Mahmood	251	5.6	▲ new
Conservative	Fergus David Robinson	229	5.1	▼11.5
Liberal Democrats	Javed Khan	139	3.1	▼16.2
Liberal Democrats	Uzman Kiani	103	2.3	▼8.1
Majority		6	0.1	▼38.6
Turnout		4460	28.23	▲9
Reform hold		Swing		
Workers Party hold		Swing		

=== 2022 Birmingham City Council election ===
Glebe Farm and Tile Cross 2022 (2)
Party	Candidate	Votes	%	±%
Labour	Marje Bridle	1,862	63.4	▼4.5
Labour	John Cotton	1,704	58.0	▼4.0
Liberal Democrats	Iftekhar Hussain	567	19.3	▲11.7
Conservative	Matthew Fox	562	19.1	▲3.8
Conservative	Faisal Mahmood	486	16.6	▲3.1
Liberal Democrats	Elizabeth Norman	306	10.4	▲3.2
Majority		1,137	38.7	
Turnout		2,936	19.23	
Labour hold		Swing		
Labour hold		Swing		
