= Red v Blue school wars =

2026 viral phenomenon

The Red v Blue school wars were a 2026 viral phenomenon spread through social media and centred on London, UK.

Social media posts on TikTok and Snapchat promoted battles between pupils from different schools, denoted red or blue (following a wider online trend of red v blue comparisons), in London, with copycat posts then coming to Bristol, Cardiff and the West Midlands. While the initial focus was on secondary schools, post-16 and higher education institutions in south London were also mentioned. Schools and police cancelled afterschool activities and patrolled the streets. Hundreds of Metropolitan Police officers were deployed.

Social media posts first appeared in Hackney and Croydon in London in mid-February 2026. Who created them is unknown, but it is thought to be young people living locally. The posts appear to have been created using generative AI. However, no violence was recorded, with the posts going on to attract more attention from parents, including in WhatsApp groups, than from their children, in what BBC News described as a "phantom trend". Children often viewed the messages as a hoax or mocked them.

Two people were arrested by Metropolitan police. Arrests were also made in Birmingham. A 13-year old boy was arrested in Sheffield.

== See also ==
- Momo Challenge hoax, a similar phantom trend
