= Hodge Hill Girls' School =

Hodge Hill Girls School

Location
- Bromford Road; Hodge Hill; Birmingham, West Midlands, B36 8EY; England
- 52.5026°N 1.8176°W

Information
- Type: Community school
- Motto: 'Educating tomorrow's women today.'
- Local authority: Birmingham City Council
- Department for Education URN: 103483 Tables
- Ofsted: Reports
- Headteacher: Sonia Adu
- Gender: Girls
- Age: 11 to 16
- Enrolment: 748 as of April 2022
- Houses: Dench (After Dame Judi Dench) Williams (After Serena Williams) Parks (After Rosa Parks) Yousafzai (After Malala Yousafzai) Curie (After Marie Curie)
- Colours: Colours depend on house: Red, Green, Yellow, Blue and Purple
- Website: https://www.hodgehgs.bham.sch.uk/

Hodge Hill Girls' School is a secondary school located in the Hodge Hill area of Birmingham, in the West Midlands of England.

Formerly a grammar school, today it is a non-selective community school administered by Birmingham City Council. Hodge Hill Girls' School offers GCSEs and ASDAN awards as programmes of study for pupils.

== Notable alumni ==
=== Hodge Hill Girls' Grammar School ===
- Sue Reeve (née Scott), pentathelete in the 1968 Summer Olympics
