= Birmingham Hodge Hill and Solihull North =

UK Parliament constituency (since 2024)

Coordinates: 52.495°N 1.79°W

- Borough constituency for the House of Commons
- Boundaries since 2024
- Boundary of Birmingham Hodge Hill and Solihull North in West Midlands region
- County: West Midlands
- Electorate: 76,922 (2023)
- Major settlements: Hodge Hill

Current constituency
- Created: 2024
- Member of Parliament: Liam Byrne (Labour)
- Seats: One
- Created from: Birmingham Hodge Hill; Meriden (part); Birmingham Yardley (minor part)

Birmingham Hodge Hill and Solihull North is a constituency of the House of Commons in the UK Parliament. Created as a result of the 2023 review of Westminster constituencies, it was first contested in the 2024 general election. It is represented by Labour Party member Liam Byrne, who was MP for Birmingham Hodge Hill from 2004 to 2024.

The constituency name refers to the Hodge Hill area of Birmingham and the northern areas of the Metropolitan Borough of Solihull.

== Constituency profile ==
The constituency is located to the east of Birmingham city centre. It is entirely urban or suburban, and neighbourhoods in the constituency include Hodge Hill, Kitts Green, Castle Bromwich and Smith's Wood. Most of the constituency lies within the boundaries of Birmingham, however Castle Bromwich and Smith's Wood, in the north-east of the constituency, form part of the Metropolitan Borough of Solihull.

The population of the area grew after World War II as a Birmingham overspill estate. Residents of the constituency are considerably more deprived and have lower rates of education and professional employment compared to national averages. The population is ethnically diverse; 50% of residents are White, 34% are Asian (primarily Pakistani) and 8% are Black. At the most recent local elections in 2026, half of the elected councillors were Labour Party councillors, however some wards elected Reform UK, Workers Party and Independent councillors. In the 2016 referendum on European Union membership, voters in the constituency strongly supported leaving the EU, with an estimated 63% voting for this option.

== Boundaries ==
The constituency comprises the following:

In the City of Birmingham:

- Bromford, Hodge Hill, Glebe Farm and Tile Cross, Heartlands, Shard End and Ward End from the Birmingham Hodge Hill constituency
- Garretts Green from the Birmingham Yardley constituency

In the Metropolitan Borough of Solihull:

- Castle Bromwich and Smith's Wood from the Meriden constituency

== Members of Parliament ==
Birmingham Hodge Hill prior to 2024

Election	Member	Party
2024	Liam Byrne	Labour

== Elections ==
=== Elections in the 2020s ===
General election 2024: Birmingham Hodge Hill and Solihull North
Party	Candidate	Votes	%	±%
Labour	Liam Byrne	10,655	31.2	▼28.7
Workers Party	James Giles	9,089	26.6	new
Reform	Jamie Pullin	6,456	18.9	▲15.8
Conservative	Caroline Clapper	4,634	13.6	▼15.0
Green	Imran Khan	2,360	6.9	▲3.4
Liberal Democrats	Qasim Esak	942	2.8	▼1.5
Majority		1,566	4.6	▼27.1
Turnout		34,136	43.9	▼9.8
Registered electors		77,737		
Labour win (new seat)				

== See also ==
- parliamentary constituencies in the West Midlands (county)
- List of parliamentary constituencies in West Midlands (region)
