= Hodge Hill College =

Location
- Bromford Road; Hodge Hill; Birmingham, West Midlands, B36 8HB; England; 52.5015°N 1.8204°W

Information
- Type: Community school
- Motto: Dream, Believe, Achieve
- Local authority: Birmingham City Council
- Department for Education URN: 103503 Tables
- Ofsted: Reports
- Headteacher: Hannah Herrmann
- Gender: Mixed
- Age: 11 to 16
- Enrolment: 1,196 as of April 2022
- Website: http://www.hodgehill.bham.sch.uk/

Hodge Hill College is a mixed secondary school located in the Hodge Hill area of Birmingham, in the West Midlands of England.

It is a non-selective community school administered by Birmingham City Council. The school serves a wide area to the north and east of the centre of Birmingham, with admission of pupils coming from some 31 different feeder primary schools.

Hodge Hill College offers GCSEs and BTECs as programmes of study for pupils. The school also has a partnership with Braidwood School for The Deaf, which is located next to Hodge Hill College.
