= Reuben Colley =

British representational painter

- Born: 1976 (age 49–50)
- Occupation: Artist
- Website: www.reubencolley.com

Reuben Colley (born 1976) is a British representational painter primarily recognised for his "gritty" city-scapes and parkland scenes depicting his home town of Birmingham, England. His work is included in the collection of the Birmingham Museum and Art Gallery and private collections both nationally and internationally.

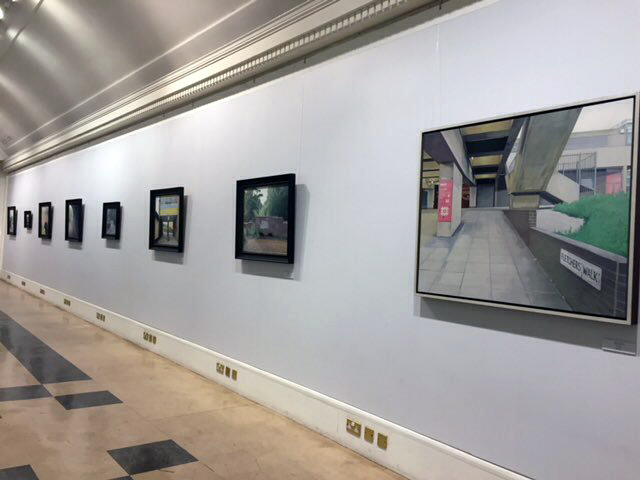
Reuben Colley Remnant Collection exhibited at Birmingham Museum and Art Gallery. 2017.

== Life ==
Colley studied at Handsworth Grammar School for Boys then Bournville Art College, Birmingham, and in 1995, he enrolled at The University of Wolverhampton, where he gained a BA Honours in Fine Art, specialising in painting.

Through his work he has supported charitable causes including Freedom from Torture and Birmingham Children's Hospital.

After founding a commercial gallery (Reuben Colley Fine Arts) in the Moseley district of Birmingham in 2010, the gallery relocated to Birmingham's city centre on Colmore Row in 2015.

Colley has said: "I don't paint a particular subject, I try to depict an atmosphere". He's explained his process, saying:

I am constantly exploring new areas of my own painting to see what creates an atmosphere or a mood for the viewer, to take them past the boundaries of being purely representational, and they become a record of my own experiences and impressions of places. [...] Painting, to me, should be a very natural process, without the restraints of gimmick and style, it is an infinite language of expression, only I find it much more comforting than using words.

== Awards ==
- 2002 Best Up and Coming Published Artist. Fine Art Trade Guild
- 2007 Best Work on Paper - Birmingham Open. Birmingham Museum and Art Gallery
- 2012 Best Painting - West Midlands Open. Wolverhampton Art Gallery / Birmingham Museums

== Exhibitions ==
- 2001 Impressions of Birmingham, Halcyon Gallery, Birmingham
- 2002 Streetlife. ICC, Birmingham
- 2002 Impressions of London, Harrods, London
- 2003 Forward. ICC, Birmingham
- 2005 California. Bruton Street, London
- 2005 Venice. ICC, Birmingham
- 2007 Urban Landscapes. New Bond Street, London
- 2007 Birmingham Open. Gas Hall, Birmingham Museum and Art Gallery
- 2008 Reuben Colley Exhibition. ICC, Birmingham
- 2008 The Art Of Birmingham 1940 to the Millennium. Birmingham Museum and Art Gallery
- 2009 Birmingham Seen. Birmingham Museum and Art Gallery
- 2010 City of Culture Exhibition in conjunction with Birmingham City Council. RCFA, Birmingham
- 2011 Reuben Colley Exhibition. Hay Hill Gallery. Cork Street, Mayfair
- 2012 My Birmingham. RCFA, Birmingham
- 2013 City Living. RCFA, Birmingham
- 2015 Change In the Inner City, Birmingham Museum and Art Gallery
- 2016 City Living Collection II. RCFA, Birmingham
- 2017 Remnant (Preview). Bridge Gallery, Birmingham Museum and Art Gallery
- 2017 Remnant. RCFA, Birmingham
- 2018 Group Exhibition. Birmingham Museum and Art Gallery
- 2022 Skatepark, RCFA, Birmingham
- 2023 Birmingham Life, RCFA, Birmingham

== Acquisitions ==
- 2002 Council House. Acquired by Birmingham City Council
- 2003 Brindley Light. Acquired by Birmingham Museum and Art Gallery
- 2006 Vitol Oil - London. Acquired by Vitol Group
- 2011 9:45 Church Street. Acquired by Brown Shipley Private Bank. Birmingham
- 2011 Selfridges at Night, Birmingham. Acquired by Selfridges, Birmingham
- 2015 John Lewis Birmingham Portfolio. (A collection of five paintings). Acquired by The John Lewis Partnership, John Lewis, Grand Central, Birmingham
- 2018 Birmingham Law Courts. Acquired by The Birmingham Law Society.
