= Washwood Heath =

Coordinates: 52.4969°N 1.8419°W

- Location within the West Midlands
- Population: 32,921 (2011 Ward)
  - Density: 80.7 per ha
- OS grid reference: SP105885
- Metropolitan borough: Birmingham
- Metropolitan county: West Midlands
- Region: West Midlands
- Country: England
- Sovereign state: United Kingdom
- Post town: BIRMINGHAM
- Postcode district: B8
- Dialling code: 0121
- Police: West Midlands
- Fire: West Midlands
- Ambulance: West Midlands
- UK Parliament: Birmingham Hodge Hill and Solihull North

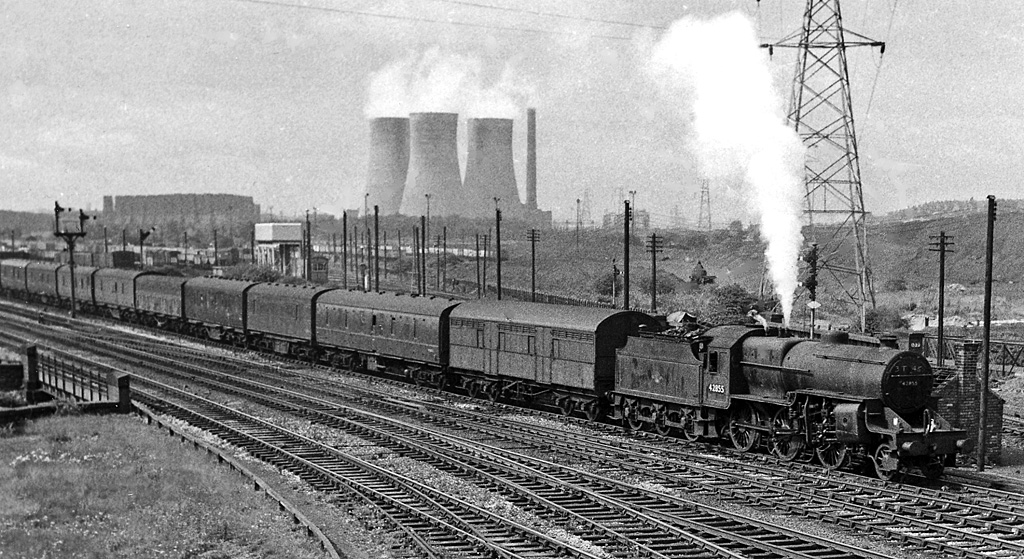
Washwood Heath railway yards in 1962

Washwood Heath is a ward in Birmingham, within the formal district of Hodge Hill, roughly two miles north-east of Birmingham city centre, England. Washwood Heath covers the areas of Birmingham that lie between Nechells, Bordesley Green, Stechford and Hodge Hill.

== Geography ==
Saltley on the south-western side and Ward End on the north-eastern side of Washwood Heath are the two areas that cover the entire ward, though some parts near Nechells and Hodge Hill do not come under either of these and are simply headed under "Washwood Heath". One of the area's major employers was the railway works owned by Metropolitan-Cammell (later Alstom), but it closed in 2005.

In the 2020s, Washwood Heath railway depot is to be constructed as part of the High Speed 2 project - to service and maintain the high speed trains.

== Demographics ==
According to the 2001 Population Census, there were 27,822 people living in the ward with a population density of 5,335 people per km^{2} compared with 3,649 people per km^{2} for Birmingham. The area is 5.2 km^{2}. Washwood Heath is an ethnically diverse community with 57% (15,863) of the ward's population being of an ethnic minority compared with 29.6% for Birmingham. It had been a major Irish community.

== Education ==
The area is served by Washwood Heath Academy. For the younger population, there is a children's centre.

== Politics ==
The ward is represented on Birmingham City Council by three councillors: Mariam Khan, Ansar Ali Khan and Mohammed Idrees, all Labour.

=== Project Champion ===
Project Champion was a project to install a £3m network of 169 Automatic Number Plate Recognition cameras to monitor vehicles entering and leaving Washwood Heath and Sparkbrook. Its implementation was frozen in June 2010 amid allegations that the police deliberately misled councillors about its purpose, after it was revealed that it was being funded as an anti-terrorism initiative, rather than for 'reassurance and crime prevention'.

== Places of interest ==
Saltley

- Adderley Park
- Adderley Park railway station
- Wheels Adventure Park

Ward End

- Fox & Goose
- Ward End Park

== Image Gallery ==
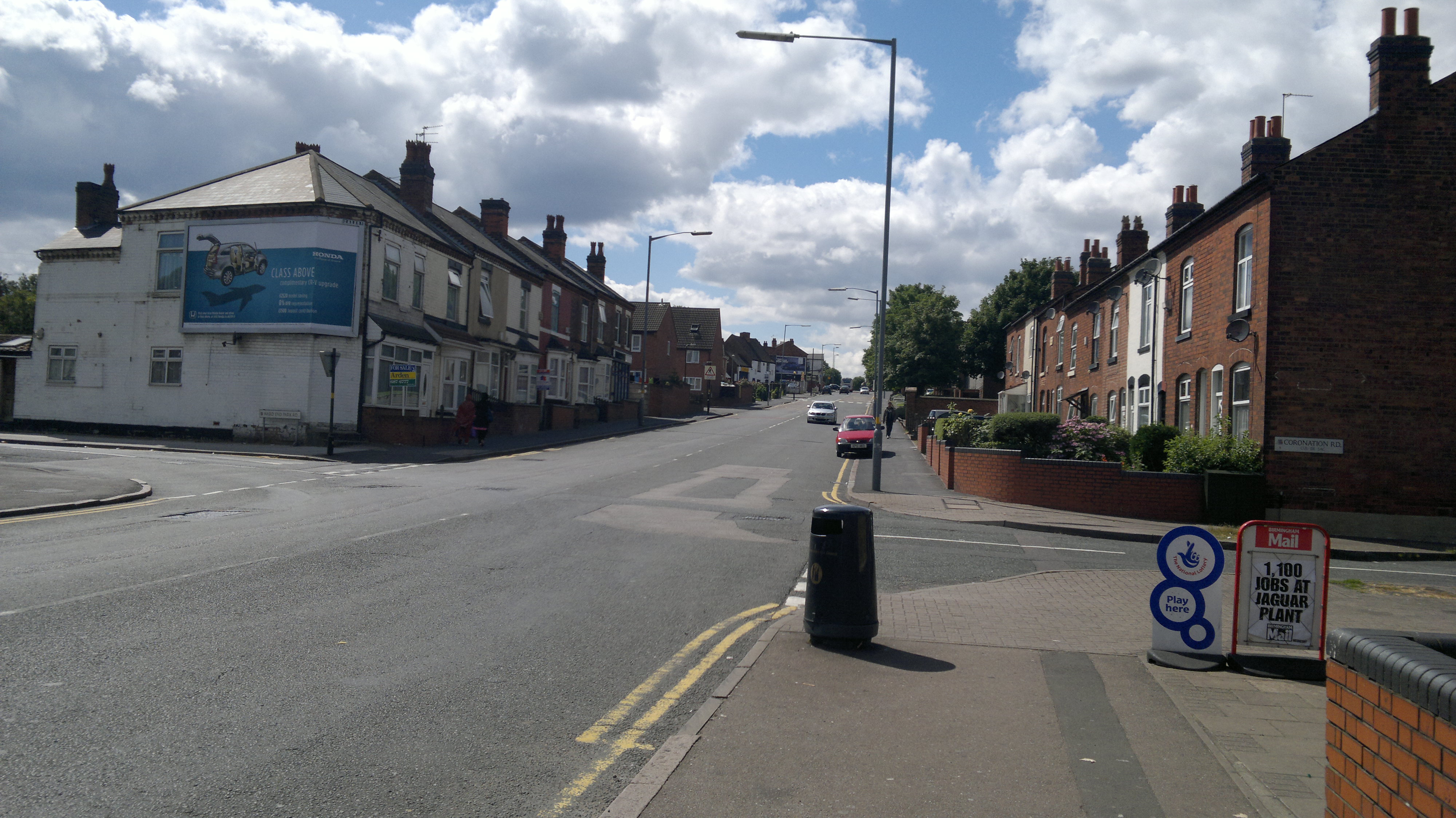
Washwood Heath Road

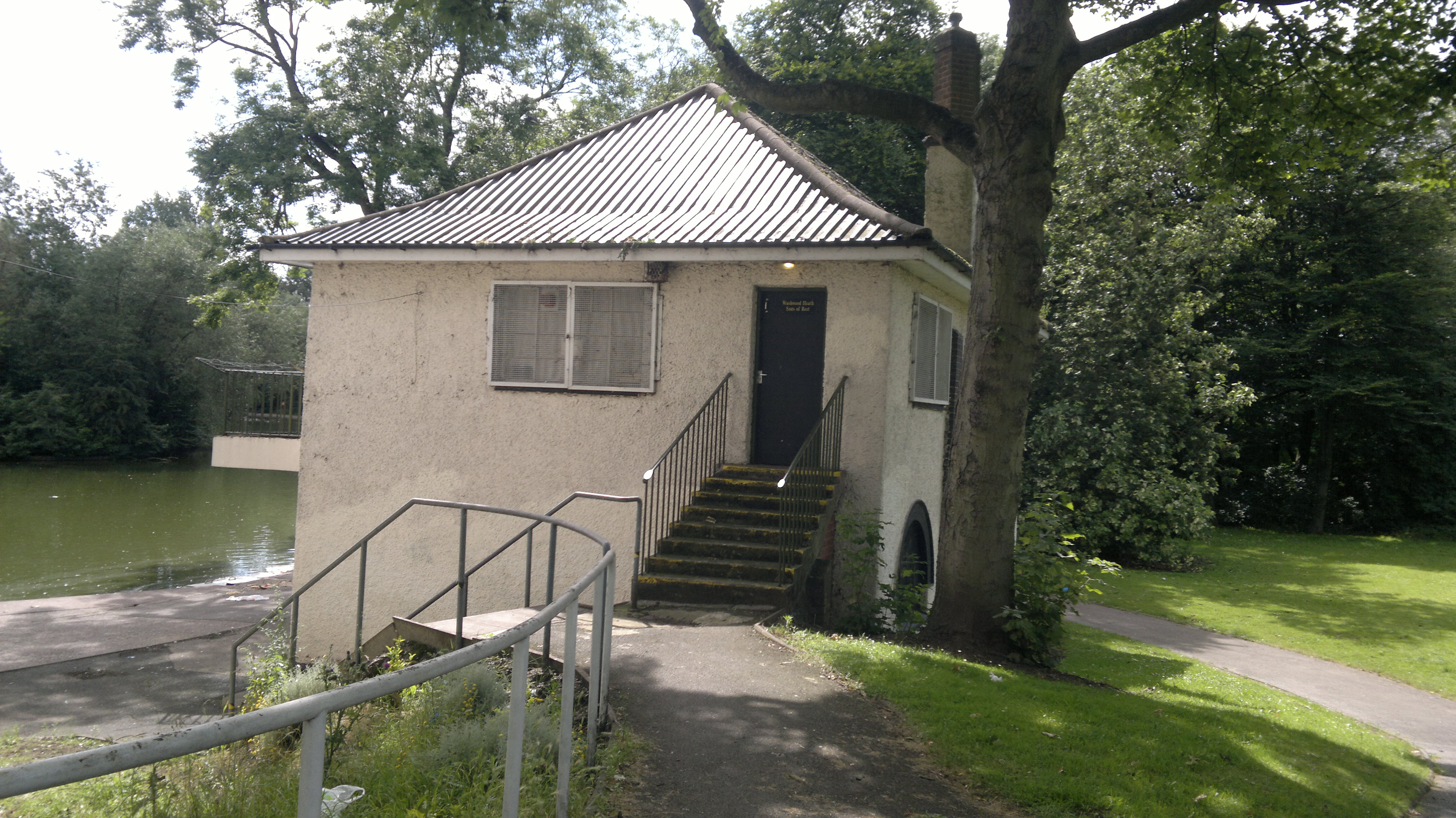
Ward End Park

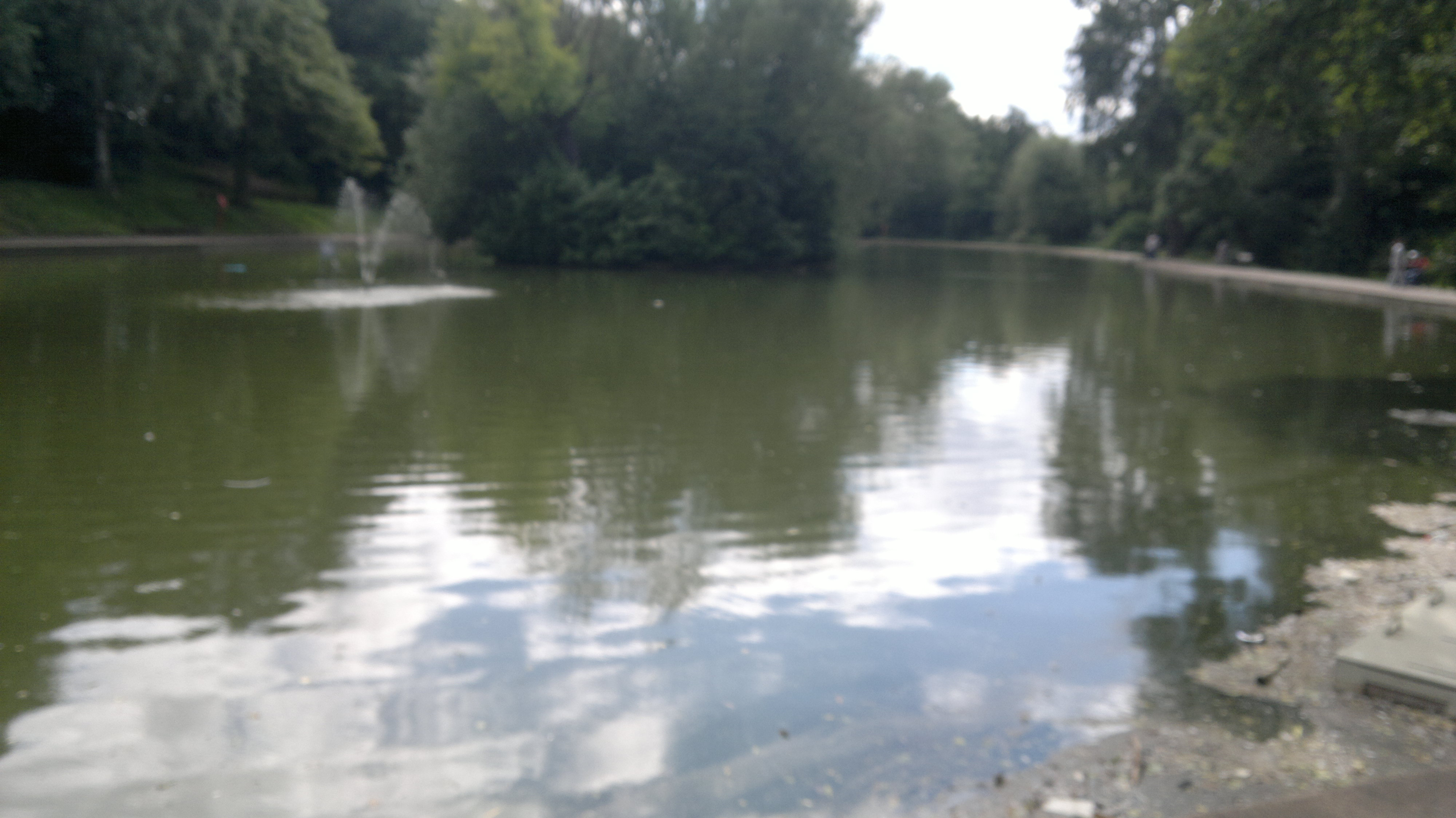
View of Ward End Park

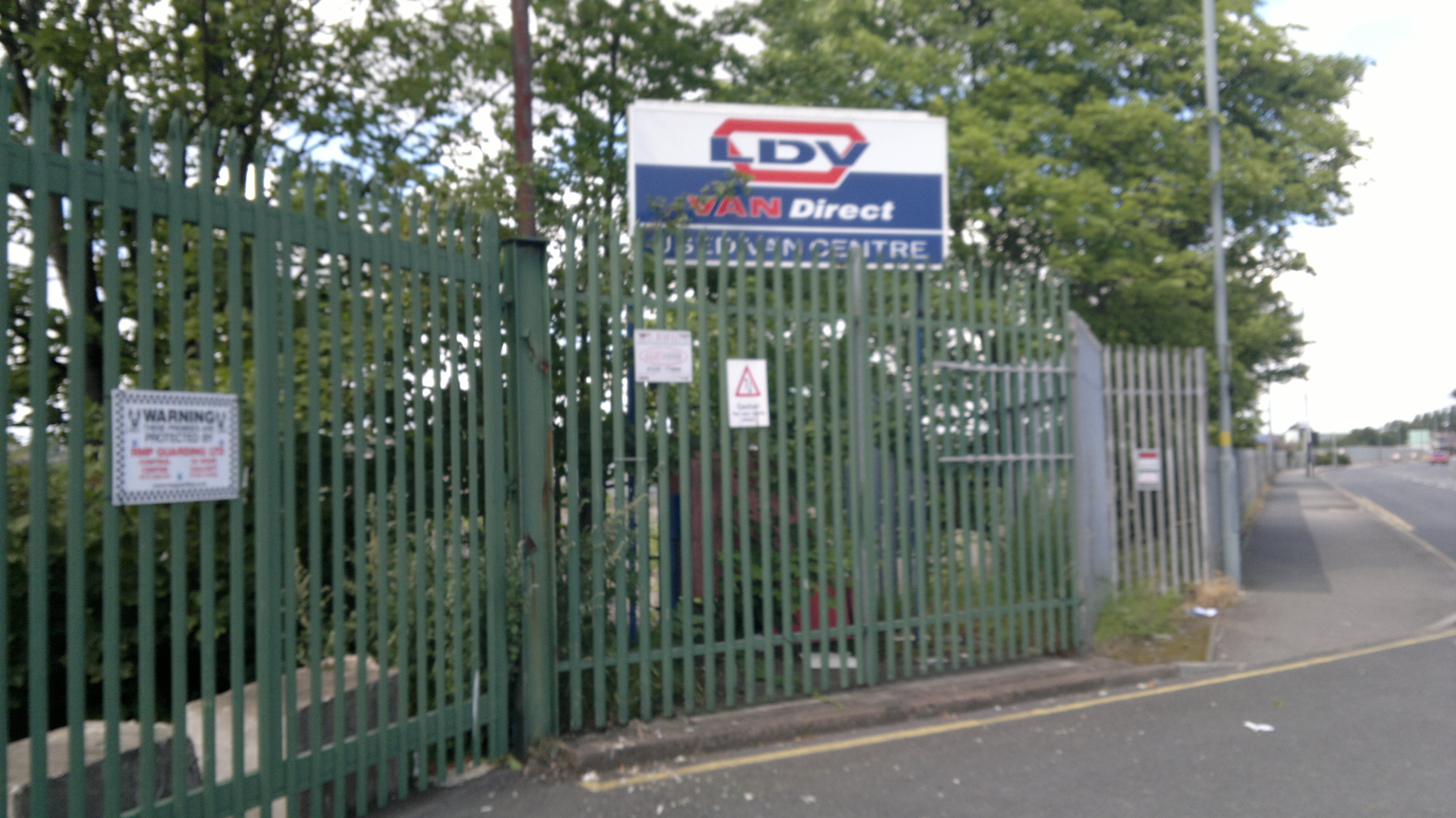
Old LDV factory

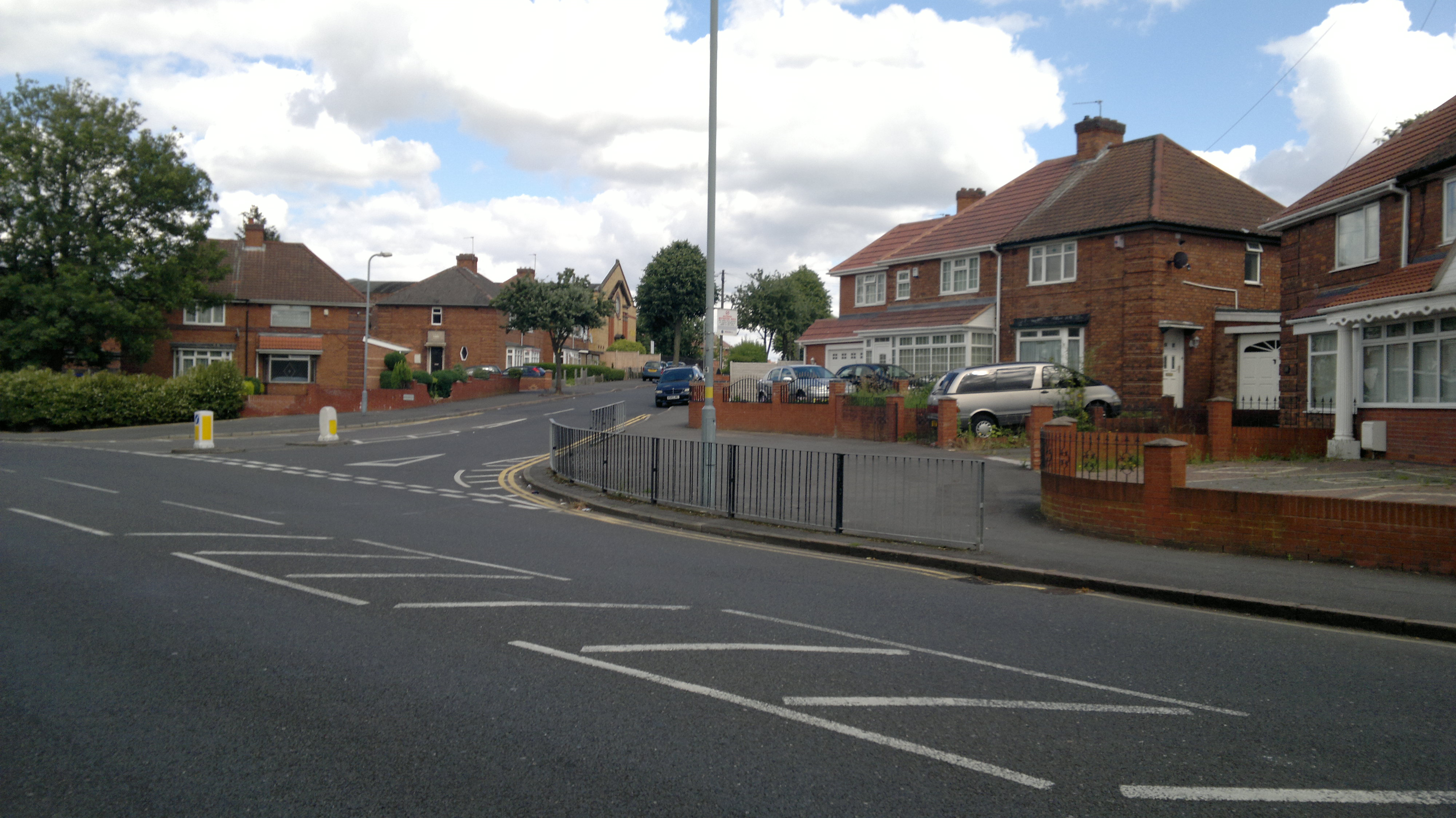
Residential Area in Washwood Heath

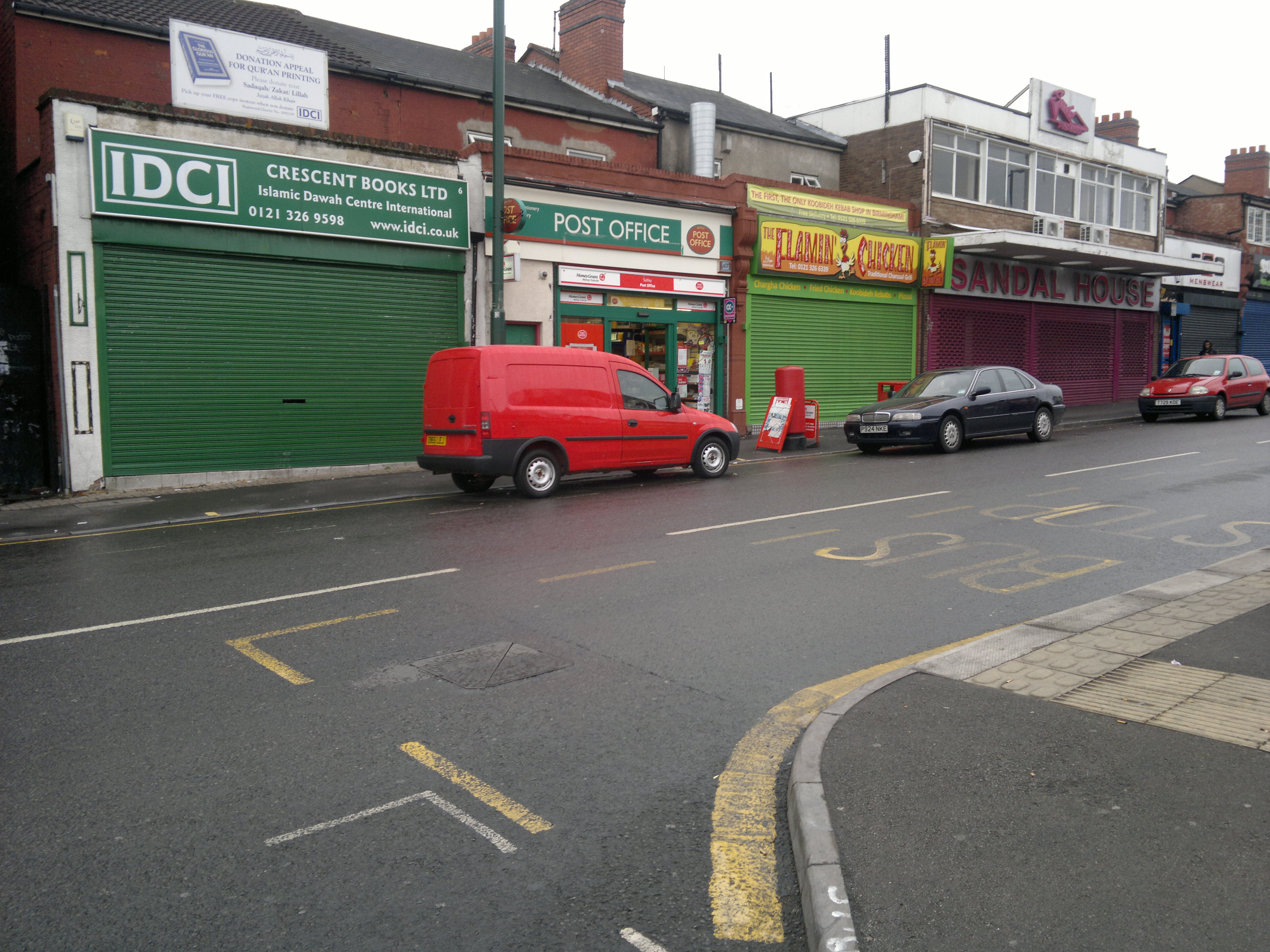
Post Office

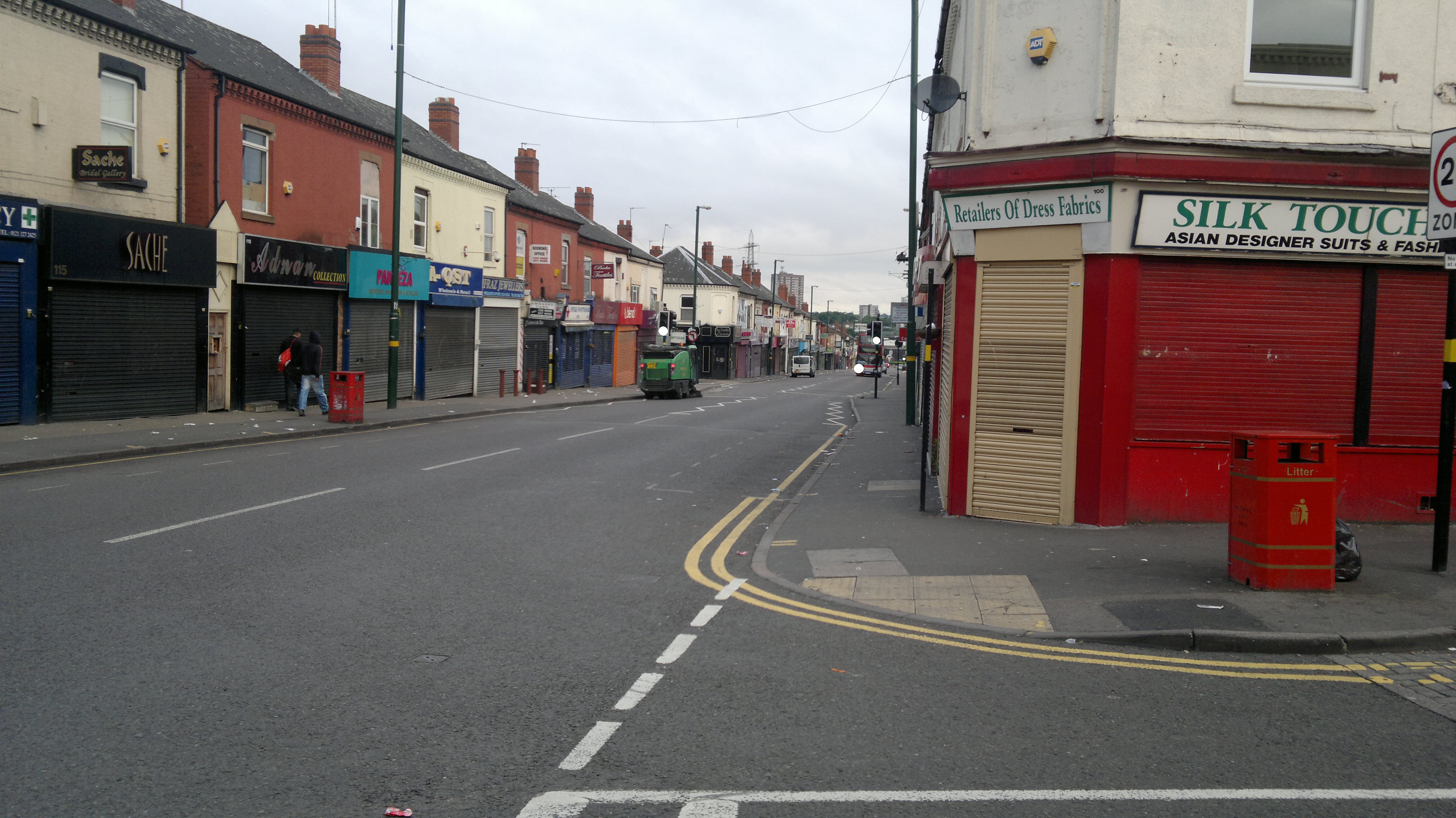
View of Alum Rock Road

== The Ward End Works ==
In 1914 the Electric & Ordnance Accessories Company Ltd (Vickers, Sons & Maxim) constructed a large factory between Common Lane and Drews Lane in the Ward End area of Washwood Heath. The Ward End Works covered an area of 65 acres (26 ha) upon completion. A distinctive feature was the Bromford House administrative block, with its 400 ft (122 m) façade fronting onto Drews Lane.

The factory was an assembly plant and before the outbreak of hostilities produced a light car called the Stellite. During its first four years, the factory also produced munitions fuses and shell cases for soldiers fighting in mainland Europe during World War I. When the war was over, Vickers, the owners of Electric & Ordnance Accessories Company Ltd, put the factory under the ownership of another subsidiary Wolseley Motors on 30 September 1919. After the change in ownership, Wolseley replaced the small workshop sheds with a large assembly building.

Wolseley began to encounter difficulties in the 1920s and it was saved after being purchased by William Morris. As a result of the purchase, car manufacturing was completely moved from the Adderley Park site, which became Morris Commercials, to the Ward End Works. Engines for the Morris Minor were also produced at the factory during the 1930s alongside the Wolseley production line.

When World War II broke out in 1939 the factory became the production base for tanks and military vehicles as well as mines. In 1941, it also began to produce the Horsa glider. By the end of the war, £500,000 worth of damage had been inflicted on the plant by the Luftwaffe in raids in 1941 and 1942.

In 1939 a new factory for the Morris Motors Pressing Branch was constructed on the Common Lane side of the Ward End Works. This was renamed Nuffield Metal Products in 1945. Production of Wolseley cars recommenced on 4 September 1945.

In 1948 the works began to encounter new problems and it was seen to be more efficient for production of new Morrises to be moved to Cowley in Oxford. By the 1950s, production was centred at Cowley and the Ward End Works were used in the productions of Nuffield Group products. Following the formation of the British Motor Corporation in 1952, parts were also made there for Austin-Healey Sprite, and the Wolseley 1500/Riley 1.5 twins. The formation of British Leyland resulted in the plant being redesignated the Austin Morris division's Transmission Plant. 4,400 workers were employed on site.

When the Adderley Park plant closed in 1972 all vehicle production was moved to the Common Lane works. During the mid-1980s there was a fire at the factory however no other problems surfaced.

In 1989 Freight Rover became Leyland-DAF Vans, which then became the LDV Group in 1993. The site covered 85 acres (34 ha), with Bromford House being used as the company's headquarters. The works have since been demolished.

The former Metro-Cammell and Leyland DAF Vans sites are to be redeveloped as the Washwood Heath depot for High Speed 2.
