= Pye Green =

Village north of Hednesford in Staffordshire, England

Coordinates: 52.725966°N 2.016229°W

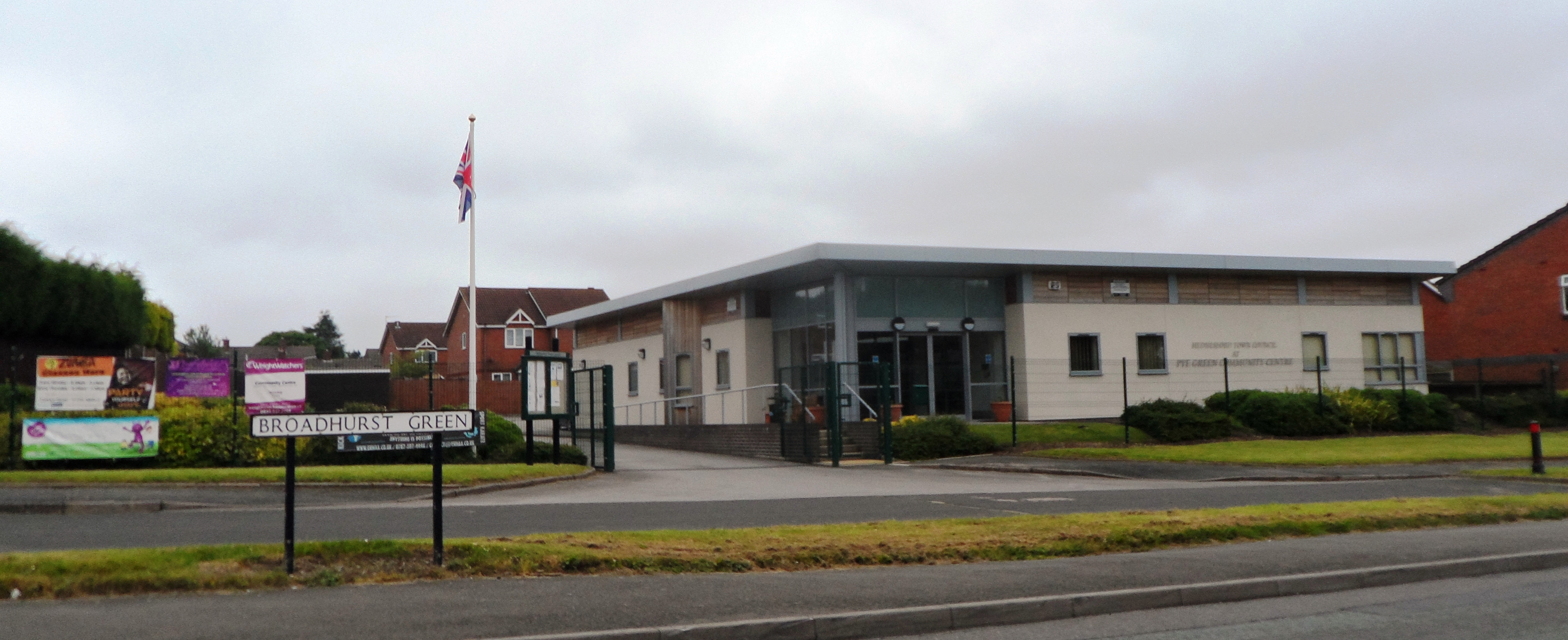
- Pye Green Community Centre

- Location within Staffordshire
- Civil parish: Hednesford
- District: Cannock Chase
- Shire county: Staffordshire
- Region: West Midlands
- Country: England
- Sovereign state: United Kingdom
- Post town: CANNOCK
- Postcode district: WS12
- Police: Staffordshire
- Fire: Staffordshire
- Ambulance: West Midlands
- UK Parliament: Cannock Chase

Pye Green is a village north of Hednesford in the Cannock Chase District in Staffordshire, England.

== Geography ==
Pye Green is served by roads running from Hednesford to Stafford and from Cannock through Chadsmoor, Brindley Heath, Slitting Mill, Etchinghill to Rugeley. The closest trunk roads are the A34 from Cannock to Stafford and the A460 from Cannock to Rugeley. Bus services are provided by Chaserider PyeGreen--Hednesford--Cannock--Pye Green and vice-versa, circular services 25/26 with a 15-or 30-minute frequency, Mon-Sat. The closest railway station is at Hednesford, which is on the Chase Line running from Rugeley Trent Valley to Birmingham New Street.

== Growth ==
In the past 100 years, the population of area has grown from possibly less than 150 people to perhaps as many as 6,000. This is mainly though council and coal board housing, and latterly through private housing, mainly down the Pye Green Valley. Today, therefore, the housing is mainly owner-occupied, with some private rentals and some council housing, being the remnants of the council housing which was not privately purchased by former tenants. The area also boasts nursery and primary schools, a community centre, several shops (butcher's, takeaways, general dealers and convenience stores), a funeral director's, a pub and social club, a pavilion and sports ground, and an equestrian centre. The nearest secondary schools are Hednesford Valley High School, Staffordshire University Academy and Kingsmead School, Hednesford.

== Pye Green Farm ==
The Samson Blewitt public house is named after a former local farmer, his Pye Green Farm predating the first housing estate comprising Clarkes Avenue and Cotton Grove, erected before WWII. Just after WWII, prefabs were erected west of this estate. They were replaced with more permanent dwellings in the 1970s and 1980s. In the meantime, council housing was developed east of this estate in conjunction with the coal board, bringing in an influx of mining families from Ayrshire, Northumberland and Durham, and South Wales in the 1960s to work in various pits in the Cannock Chase Coalfield. Most of the land in the Pye Green Valley was developed in the 1980s onwards. Apart from an area where mine shafts were located and the land is boggy (which now comprises parkland), this development has removed most of the green space between Pye Green and Hednesford or Pye Green and Chadsmoor, and so it may not always be clear who lives in Pye Green and who doesn't.

== Notable sites ==
Land to the west and north of the built area comprises what remains of The Chase, or Cannock Forest. Close by are the Commonwealth War Graves Cemetery and German Military Cemetery, and the ruined remains of Brindley Village and of RAF Hednesford.

The road out of Pye Green to the north-west towards Stafford climbs to the highest point for miles around. Because of this height, it hosts the local BT communications tower landmark (which can be seen from the nearby M6 motorway and the West Coast Main Line). The tower relays line-of-sight microwave communication links between equivalent towers at Sutton Common in Cheshire and in the centre of Birmingham, eventually down to London BT Tower. Near to the BT Tower is an older structure, the Pye Green Pumping Station and Water Tower, which has operated since 1934.

Other pieces of history, now barely visible, included gallops for thoroughbreds dating from when Hednesford was a significant training centre, before and during the advent of coal mining. They included a mission church (St. Marks) and a chapel (top of Bradbury Lane) which were part of the extension of Christian buildings into the area in the 1890s. They included three working men's clubs which went with mining - only one still operates. The chapel (which was later part of one of the clubs and turf accountant's and then of a pub) overlooked a quarry which was subsequently used for landfill and is now a green space. The nearest working quarry now is to the west, above Pottal Pool, the latter having once been a lido. Oldest artefact of all is the Wishing Stone on or near the (possible) route of Blake Street (or Blake Road). Before the coming of canals and railways, this provided one of a few alternative routes for stage-coach travel between London and Chester or Birmingham and Manchester, via Hednesford through to Stafford. As for the mining, and the canals, railways and other infrastructure which went with it, the closest pits were sunk down the Pye Green Valley, fringing the Green Heath, Blake Street (Belt Road) and the railway to Cannock. This was the site of West Cannock pits nos. 1, 3 and 4.

== Hednesford Town Council ==
Pye Green is the administrative headquarters of Hednesford Town Council, which meets in the Pye Green Community Centre (opened 1974. and renovated about 2012). Pye Green lies in the territories administered by Cannock Chase District Council and Staffordshire County Council. It is also in the Cannock Chase (UK Parliament constituency).
