= George Bernard Cox =

British architect

Major George Bernard Cox FRIBA
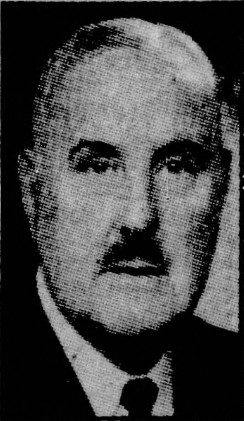
- Cox in the Birmingham Daily Post, 1950
- Born: 31 July 1886; Handsworth, Staffordshire, England
- Died: 20 October 1978 (aged 92); Minehead, Somerset, England
- Occupation: Architect

Major George Bernard Cox FRIBA (31 July 1886 – 20 October 1978) was a British architect and co-founder with Arthur Harrison of Harrison and Cox. He primarily designed Roman Catholic churches.

== Life ==
He was born on 31 July 1886 in Birmingham, the son of George Henry Cox (1854-1893) and Mary Elizabeth Cox (1855-1931). He married Mary Hopwood, eldest daughter of T.W. Hopwood of Lea Hall, Handsworth on 1 July 1914 in St Chad’s Cathedral, Birmingham. Their son, Lieutenant Christopher P.B. Cox, R.A. was killed in action in Burma in 1944 aged 23.

From the Artists Rifles O.T.C. he became a 2nd Lieutenant in the East Yorkshire Regiment on 5 September 1916 and then the Corps of Royal Engineers in November 1917. He also served in the Second World War.

He formed a partnership with Arthur Harrison sometime in the first decade of the 20th century, and this partnership survived until Arthur Harrison's death in 1922. The business continued under the name Harrison & Cox.

He retired in 1967 aged 80 and died on 20 October 1978 at Huntspill, The Parks, Minehead and left an estate valued at £262,772.

== List of works ==
=== Churches ===
- St Elizabeth's Church, Coventry 1914-16
- Sacred Heart and St Margaret Mary Church, Aston 1922 and 1934 Grade-II listed
- Franciscan Monastery, Olton, Birmingham 1925 (extensions)
- St Edward's Church, Selly Park Birmingham, 1925-26 (sanctuary and side chapels)
- Birmingham Oratory 1927 (North east chapel with the shrine of St Philip)
- Church of the Holy Ghost and Mary Immaculate, Olton, Birmingham 1929
- St Mary’s Redemptorist Church, Clapham 1930 (extensions)
- St Joseph and St Helen's Church, King's Norton, Birmingham 1933
- Our Lady of Lourdes Church, Hednesford 1928–34 Grade-II listed
- Holy Trinity Church, Sutton Coldfield, Birmingham 1934
- Roman Catholic Church, High Street, Brownhills 1935
- St Mary and St John's Church, Gravelly Hill, Birmingham 1937
- Roman Catholic Church of the Sacred Heart and St Theresa, Coleshill 1938-42
- St Augustine’s Roman Catholic Church, Uplands Road/Avenue Road, Handsworth 1939
- Roman Catholic Church of the Sacred Heart and Holy Souls, Acock’s Green 1940
- Church of the Sacred Heart and St Theresa, Coleshill 1941
- Roman Catholic Church, Swadlingcote, 1956
- Our Lady of the Assumption, Old Oscott Hill, Maryvale, Warwickshire 1954-57
- St Patrick's Church, Walsall 1964
- Our Lady of Lourdes, Yardley Wood, Birmingham 1964-65
- St Catherine of Siena Church, Birmingham 1961-65

=== Other ===
- New Institute, St Francis’ Church, Wretham Road, Handsworth 1907-09
- House, 35 St Bernard's Road, Olton 1909
- College Arms, 976 Stratford Road, Hall Green, Birmingham 1913
- Redhill Tavern, 1123 Coventry Road, Hay Mills, Birmingham 1926
- Village Hall in Tanworth-in-Arden 1927
- Brookhill Tavern, Alum Rock, Birmingham 1927–28
- Richmond public house, Richmond Road, Bordesley Green East, Birmingham 1930
- Bakelite offices and factory, Birmingham 1930
- Wing to Oscott College 1931
- York public house, York Road / Fox Hollies Road, Hall Green, Birmingham 1931
- Boys’ Club, Summer Lane, Birmingham 1932
- Parish hall for Church of Our Lady and St Rose of Lima, Weoley Castle 1933
- Court Oak Public House, Harborne 1934
- St Vincent’s Roman Catholic Schools, Vauxhall Grove, Birmingham 1935
- Schools at the Roman Catholic Church of Christ the King, Kingstanding 1935-36
- Assembly Room Bay, The York, Hall Green 1936
- Welfare Centre, Weoley Castle Road, Weoley Castle 1936
- Pews for St Chad's Cathedral, Birmingham 1940
- Tablet memorial to Archbishop Thomas Leighton Williams for St Chad's Cathedral, Birmingham 1946
- St Mary and St John's Church, Erdington, Birmingham 1961-62 (tower)

== Gallery ==
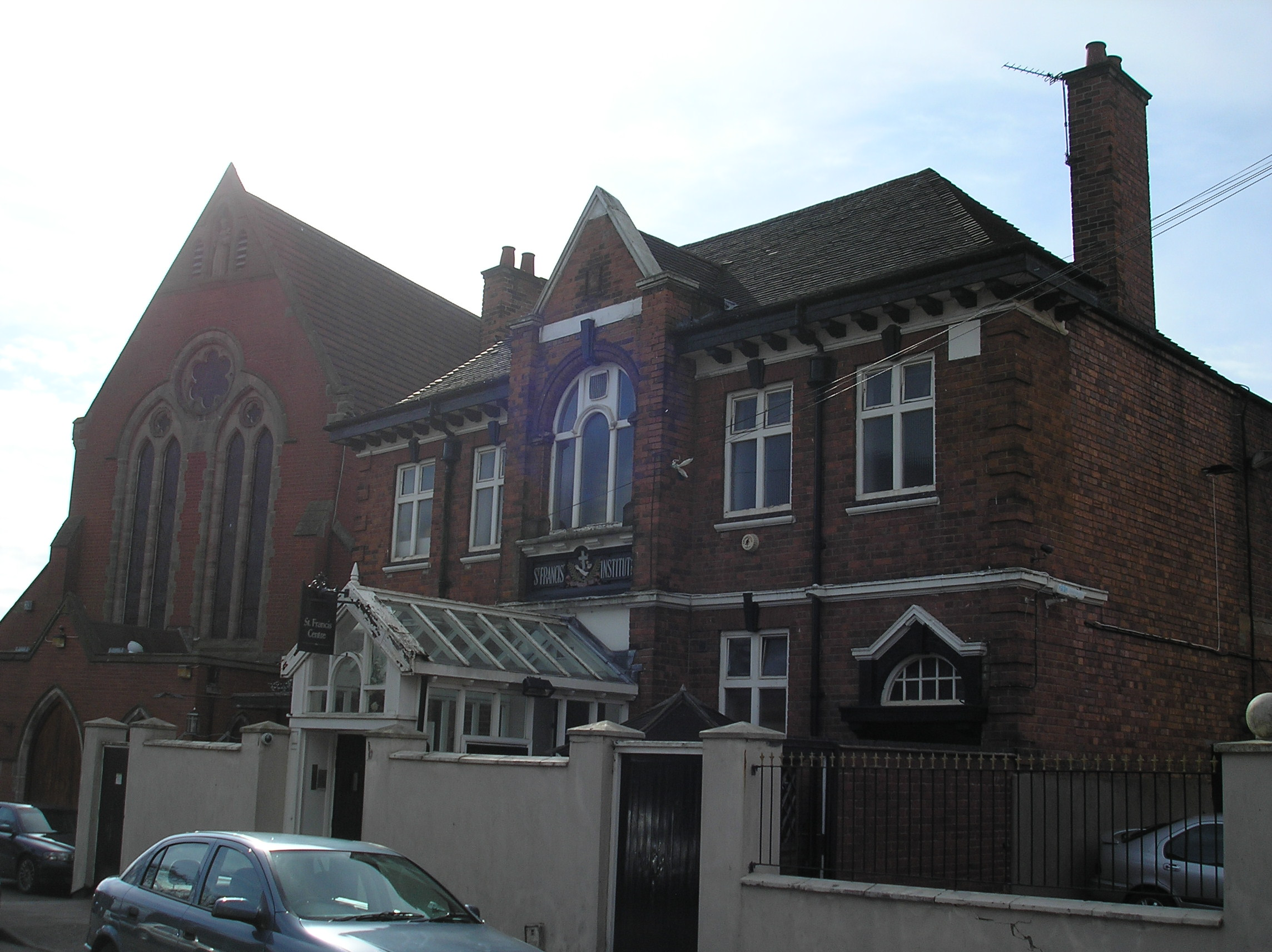
Institute, St Francis of Assisi, Handsworth

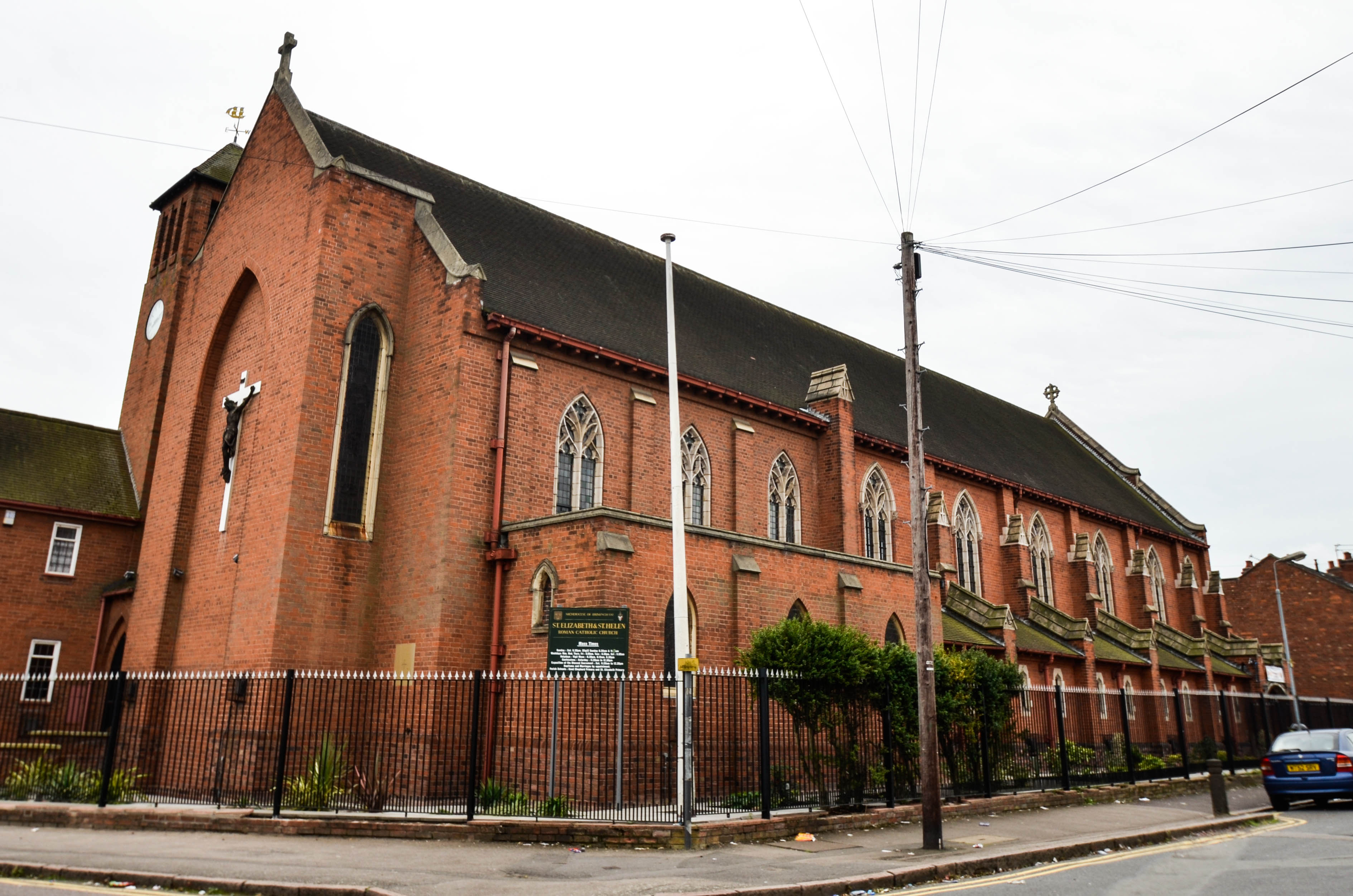
St Elizabeth's Church, Coventry

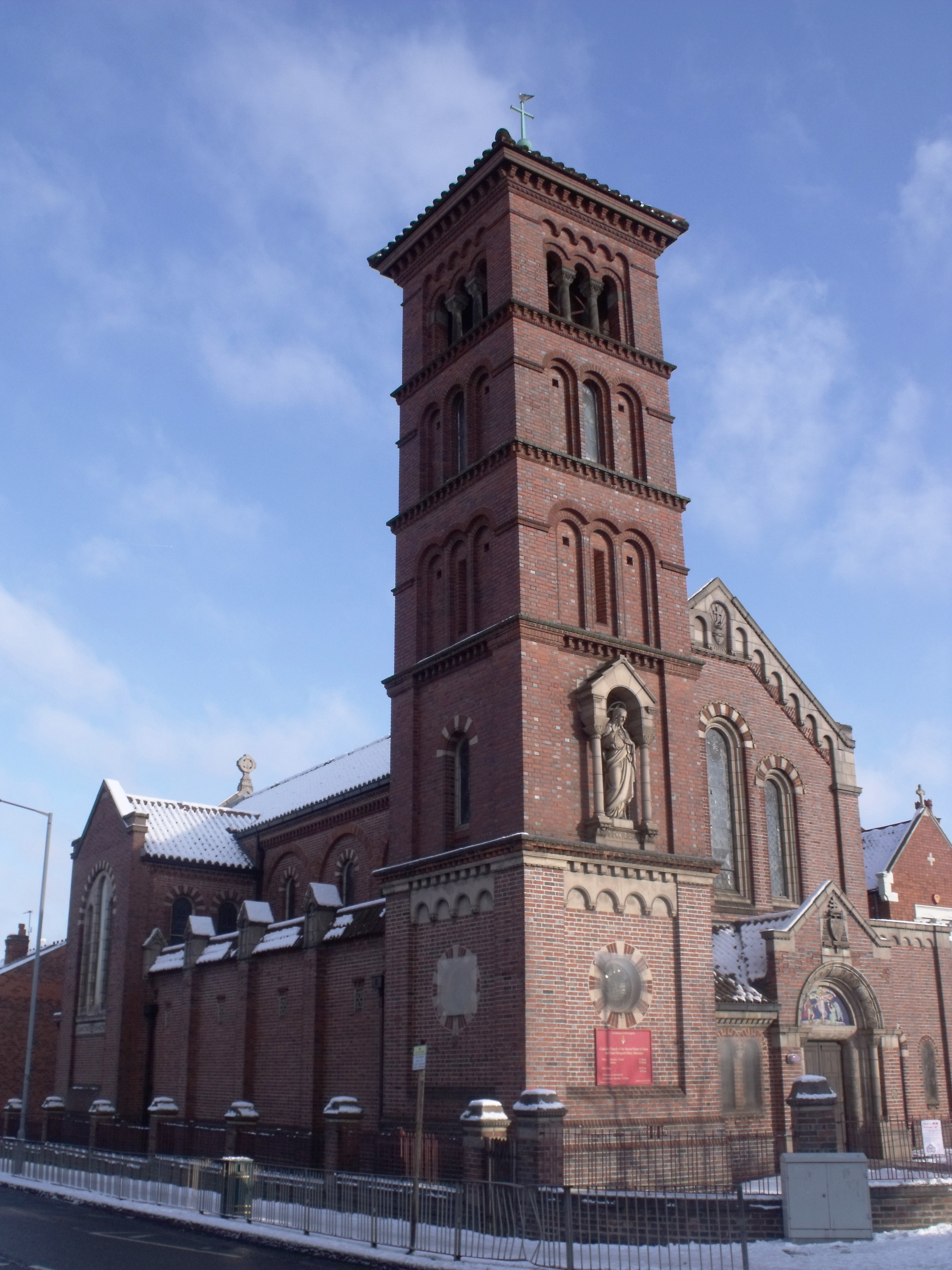
Sacred Heart and St Margaret Mary Church, Aston

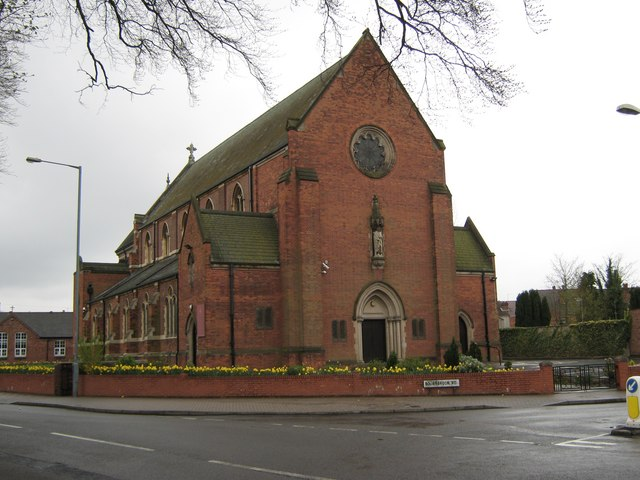
St Edward's Church, Selly Park, Birmingham

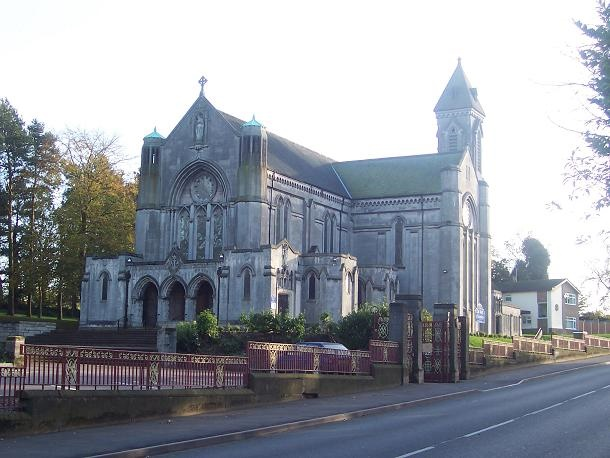
Our Lady of Lourdes Church, Hednesford

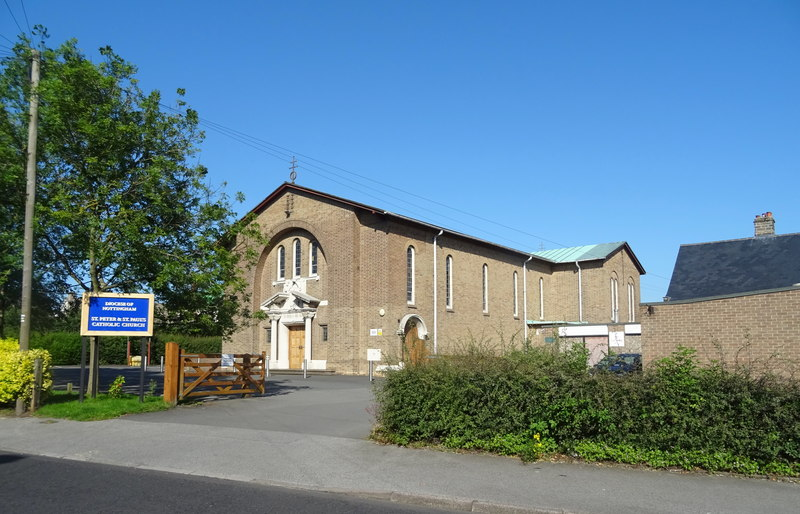
Swadlincote Catholic Church

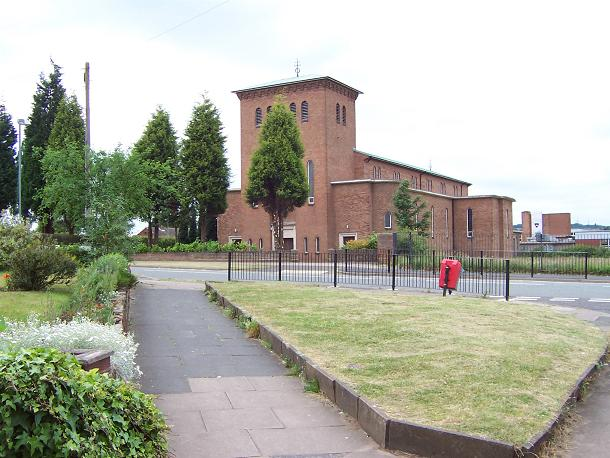
Our Lady of the Assumption, Old Oscott Hill

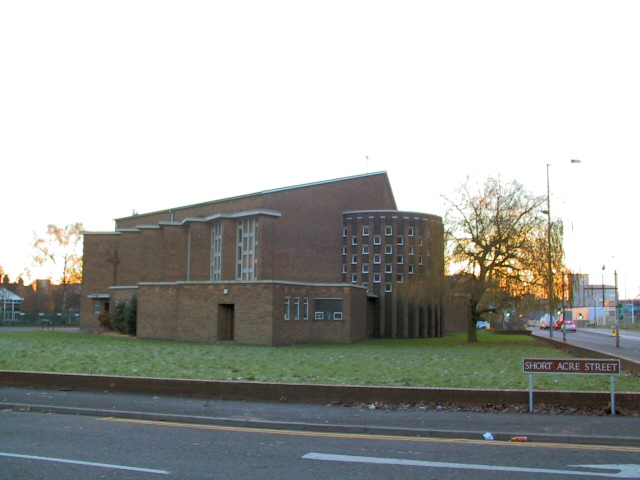
St Patrick's Church, Walsall

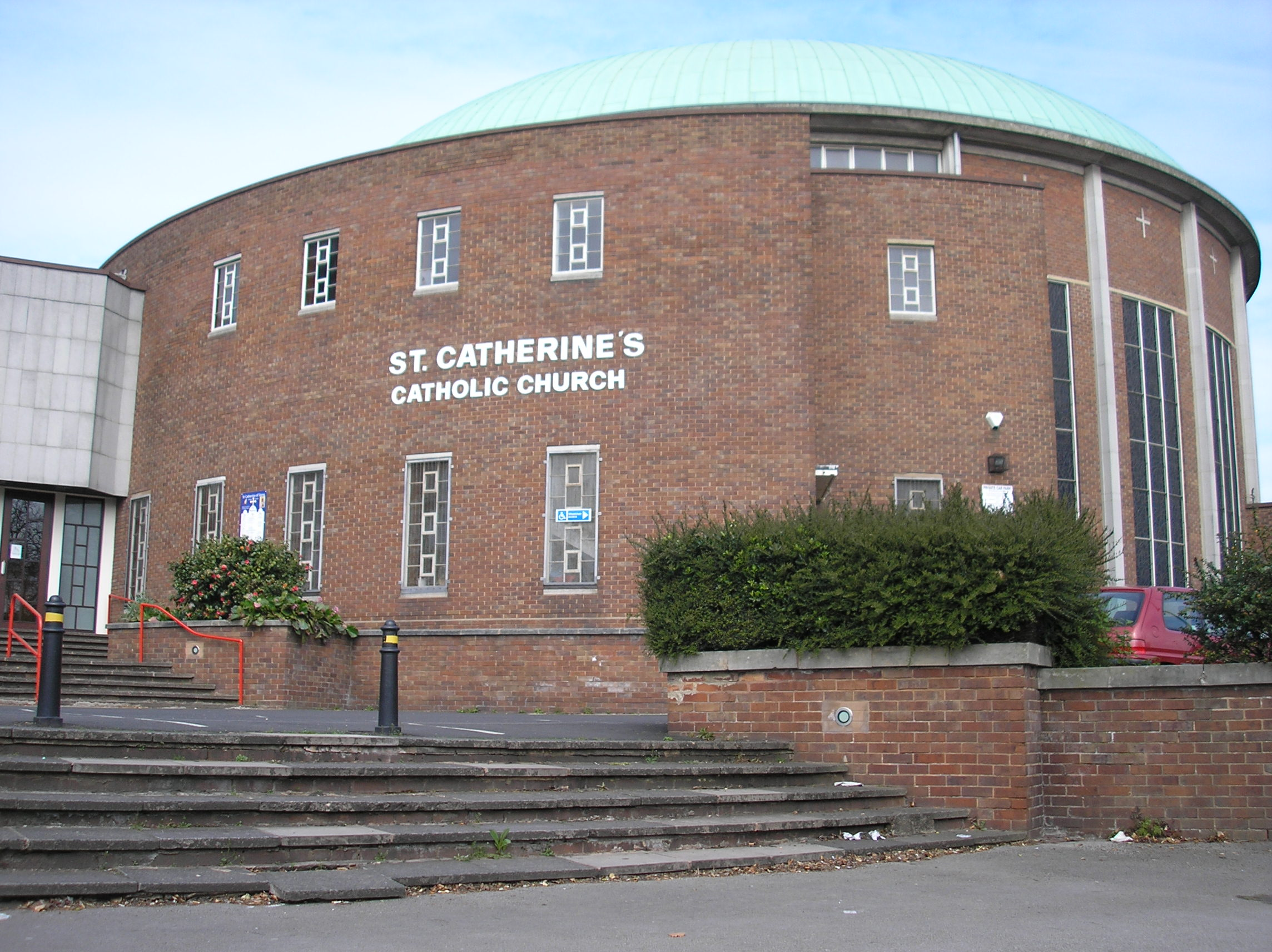
St Catherine of Siena Church, Birmingham
