= Listed buildings in Hednesford =

Hednesford is a town and a civil parish in the district of Cannock Chase, Staffordshire, England. The parish contains six listed buildings that are recorded in the National Heritage List for England. All the listed buildings are designated at Grade II, the lowest of the three grades, which is applied to "buildings of national importance and special interest". The listed buildings consist of a farmhouse, a public house, a large house later used for other purposes, a war memorial, a church, and an associated shrine

== Buildings ==
Name and location	Photograph	Date	Notes
Cross Keys Farmhouse; 52.69960°N 1.99640°W	—	16th century (probable)	The farmhouse is plastered on a timber framed core, and has sprocket eaves and a tile roof. There are two storeys and an attic, five bays, and rear extensions. The upper storey of the left gable end is jettied, and the windows are casements.
Cross Keys Inn; 52.70044°N 1.99688°W		1746	The public house is stuccoed with a timber framed core, and has a parapet containing a moulded panel. There are two storeys and five bays. The doorway has a Roman arch, and there is a similar blocked arch to the right. In the right two bays are bay windows, and the other windows are mullioned and transomed casements with keyblocks.
Anglesey Hotel; 52.70916°N 2.00042°W		1831	A large house, later used for other purposes, it is stuccoed and in Tudor Revival style. There are two storeys and five bays, the outer bays wider, projecting, and having stepped gables with obelisk finials. The central bay has a smaller gable containing an armorial shield, and with a finial. In the recess is a three-bay loggia with four-centred arched heads, surmounted by a pierced balustrade. The windows are multi-paned casements.
War Memorial and Gates; 52.71045°N 1.99480°W		1922	The war memorial is in grey granite, and consists of a square tapering column about 8.5 metres (28 ft) high surmounted by a square capital with a carved cross on each face. On the front of the column is a bronze inverted sword, and at the base are four bronze laurel wreaths. Under this is a large square plinth that has bronze tablets with inscriptions and the names of those lost in the First World War. At the base is a stone plaque relating to the Second World War and later conflicts, and in front are two large shells. The memorial is approached by a drive about 80 metres (260 ft) long, and at the entrance are a double road gate and a pedestrian gate, all in wrought iron, and three square piers with moulded panels and capitals.
Church of Our Lady of Lourdes, walls and railings 52.70549°N 1.99665°W		1927–33	A Roman Catholic church designed by George Bernard Cox in French Gothic style, it is built in reinforced concrete, faced in white granite, and has a Welsh slate roof. The church has a cruciform plan, and consists of a nave with polygonal chapels, north and south transepts, a chancel with an apsidal east end containing a rose window. Between the chancel and the south transept is a sacristy and a bell tower with a pyramidal roof. To the west of the church is a low stone wall with iron railings containing two sets of entrance gates, two pedestrian gates, and a vehicular entrance.
Shrine; 52.70585°N 1.99616°W	—	1927–34	The shrine is to the north of the Church of Our Lady of Lourdes, its design based on the shrine at Lourdes. It consists of a grotto in concrete and stone in front of a man-made mound of earth, and contains a niche with a statue of Our Lady of Lourdes. The grotto is flanked by six stone pylons in Art Deco style.
