= Hednesford Park =

Park in Hednesford, England

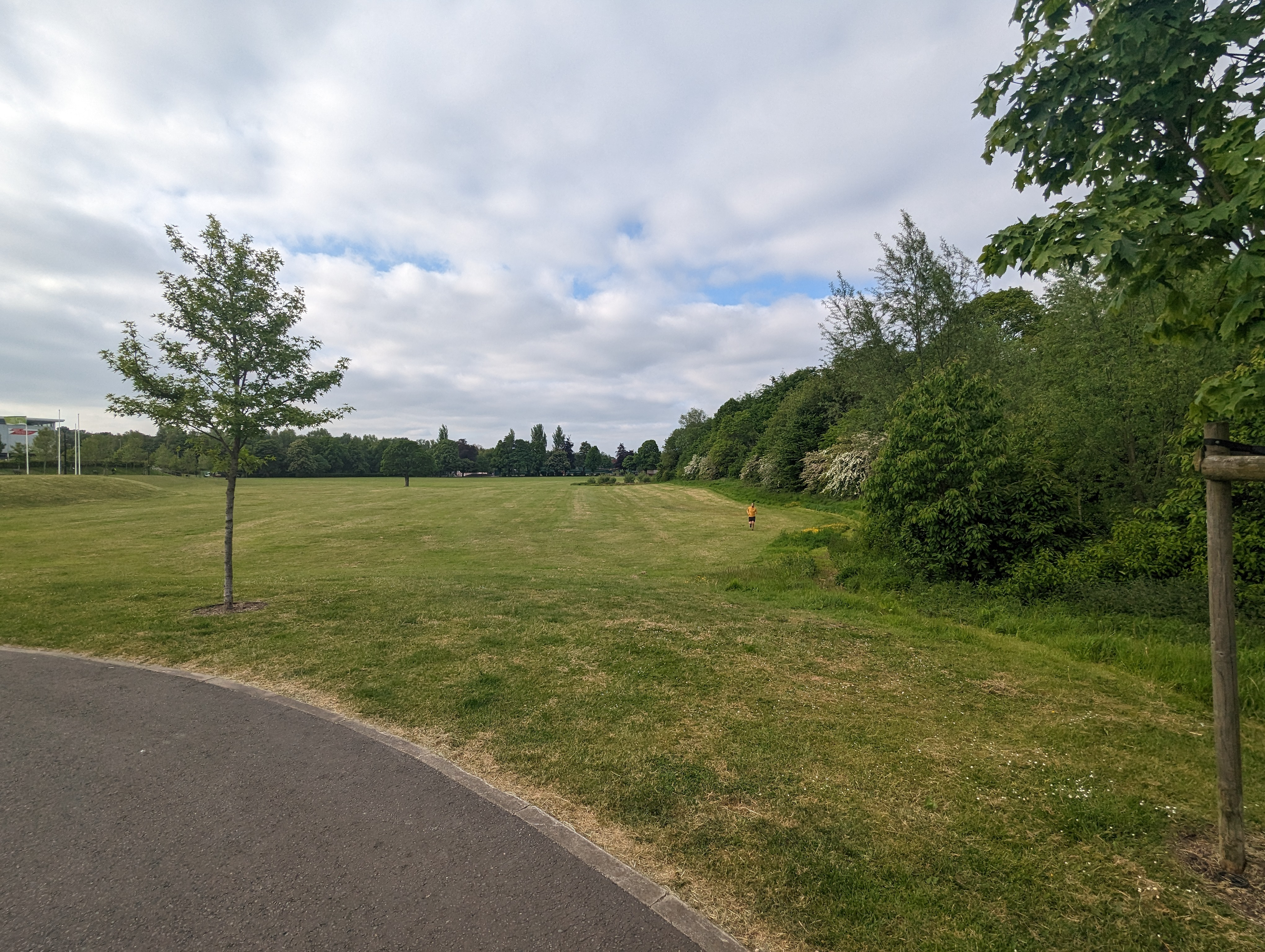
- Hednesford Park, viewed from the southernmost entrance on Victoria Street

- Location within Staffordshire
- Type: Public park
- Location: Hednesford, England
- Coordinates: 52°42′40″N 1°59′46″W
- Created: 1931
- Operator: Cannock Chase District Council
- Status: Open
- Public transit: Hednesford § Transport
- Website: www.cannockchasedc.gov.uk/content-z-tags/hednesford-park

Hednesford Park is a park located in Hednesford, Staffordshire, England. The park covers an area of 24 acres (9.7 hectares), consisting of a recreational field area, running track, skatepark, play area, cafe, and tennis courts. The park is adjacent to Hednesford town centre and the Hednesford Hills nature reserve.

== Location ==
Hednesford Park, marked with entrances

The park is located in Hednesford town centre on Victoria Street, one street north of the town's market street. It is bounded to the west by the Chase Line heavy railway and to the east by the A460 road, the latter separating it from the Hednesford Hills nature reserve and Hednesford War Memorial. The park is immediately north of the Victoria Shopping Park and south of a residential housing estate.

=== Transport ===
The park has one bus stop directly adjacent to it on the A460, called Beverley Hill. It sees an hourly bus service between Rugeley and Cannock. The park is, however, also a short walk from Hednesford's town centre bus station and Hednesford railway station.

The park is additionally served by a car park, which is open 24/7. The car park is free to use, but parking may be restricted for large events.

== History ==
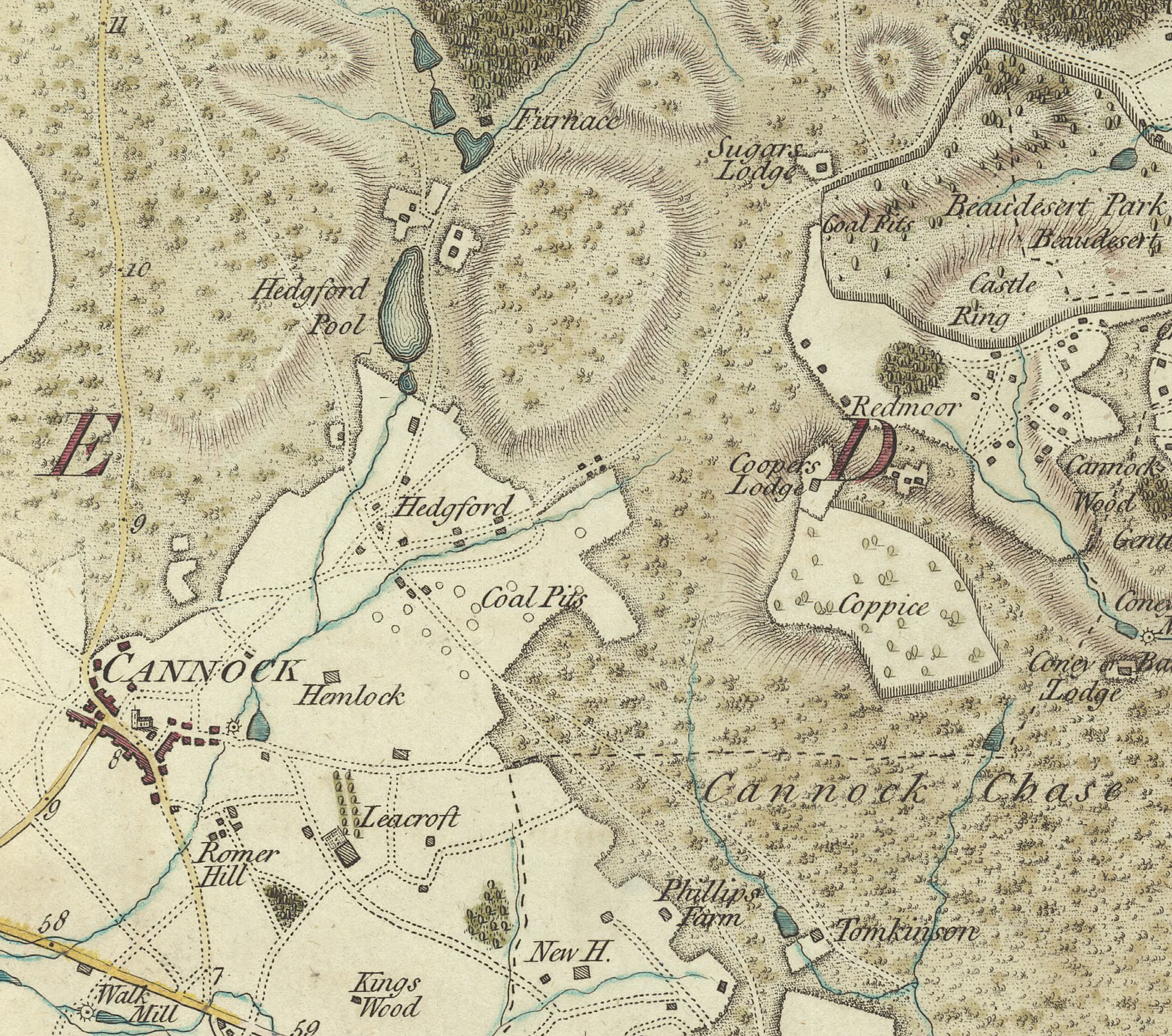
An excerpt from William Yates' 1775 map of the County of Stafford, showing Hednesford Pool (then Hedgford Pool)

The site which Hednesford Park now sits on was once occupied by Hednesford Pool, (Note: or Hedgford Pool. Discussion about Hednesford's placenames can be found at Hednesford § Toponymy.) a body of water covering 27 acres (11 hectares). In the 1870s, a colliery known as the Pool Pit, named after Hednesford Pool, was opened nearby. To prevent the colliery, later renamed the Valley Pit, from flooding, the Cannock & Rugeley Colliery Company diverted the Bentley Brook which fed the pool. As a result, the pool began to dry up, and by 1900 it was completely dry. The modern park was opened in 1931, when the land was given to the local council by the Cannock Chase Miners’ Welfare Committee.

The park saw an extensive £3 million redevelopment between 2014 and 2019, featuring the construction of a new play area, skatepark, and café. Sports England originally objected to part of the redevelopment, asking the council to justify the removal of one of the park's two bowling greens. However, they accepted the fact that neither green had been used since 2009 and withdrew their objection. As part of the redevelopment, the local council installed electronic visitor counters on all entry points to the park. They recorded almost 590,000 visitors in 2019.

The park won gold Britain in Bloom awards in the It's Your Neighbourhood category in 2017 and 2018, along with gold Heart of England in Bloom parks-category awards in 2021 and 2022.

== Facilities ==
Hednesford Park features a large recreational field area bounded to the north, east, and west by trees. The field contains a football pitch, and there is also another football pitch in the north of the park. The park also features a skatepark, parkour area, tennis courts, a play area, and a café known as The Pavilion. In 2014, Cannock Chase District Council moved a historic signal box from its original 1876 site by the Chase Line into Hednesford Park.

== Events ==
=== Weekly events ===
Hednesford Park hosts a weekly roster of events, running every day of the week except Saturday. Details of these events are published on The Friends of Hednesford Park website and include the following:

- A weekly walk starting and ending in the park
- Tennis sessions operated by Cheslyn Hay Tennis Club
- English and maths skills, taught through art, for adults
- Work experience for schools

=== Hednesford Festival ===
The park is host to the annual Hednesford Festival, featuring a travelling funfair, market and charity stands, children's entertainment, a food area and vehicles on display. In 2022, the organisers Hednesford in Partnership reported that over 4,000 people attended.

The 2023 event was slated for 12 August, featuring a planned World War I experience, tennis tournament, maypole workshops, cycling, skate park competition, traditional team games, and live entertainment, along with the activities mentioned above.

=== Chase Pride ===
In 2022, the park was selected to host Chase Pride, the first ever LGBTQ pride festival to be held in Cannock Chase. Turnout was estimated at 4,000 people, and acts included Cheryl Hole, Danny Beard, and Woody Cook.

The park was selected to host the event again in 2023, and the event is set to include two stages of entertainment, a market, a travelling funfair, a food court, and a pride parade running through Hednesford town centre to the park. Planned acts include Danny Beard, Angie Brown, and Jaymi Hensley of Union J.
