= Our Lady of Lourdes Church, Hednesford =

Church in Staffordshire, England

- Shrine and Parish Church of Our Lady of Lourdes, Hednesford
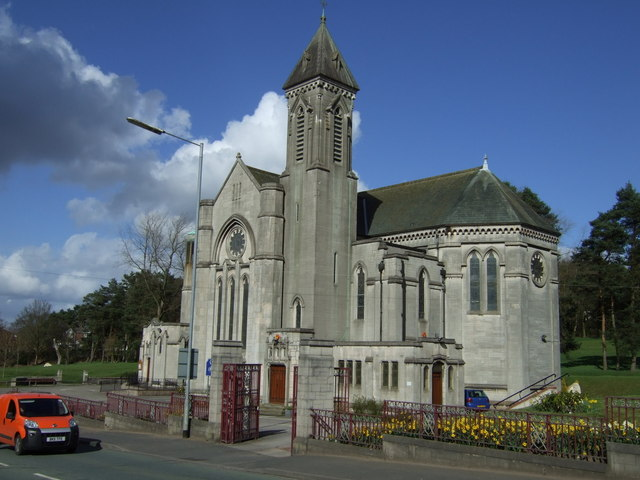
- Southeast view of the church
- Our Lady of Lourdes Church, Hednesford
- 52.705458°N 1.996991°W
- OS grid reference: SK 00314 11979
- Location: Uxbridge Street, Hednesford, Staffordshire
- Country: England
- Denomination: Roman Catholic
- Website: ladyoflourdes.co.uk

Listed Building – Grade II
- Official name: Roman Catholic Church of Our Lady of Lourdes, including boundary walls and railings
- Designated: 9 May 2016
- Reference no.: 1430855

History
- Consecrated: 1934

Architecture
- Functional status: Active
- Architect: G. B. Cox
- Architectural type: French Gothic
- Groundbreaking: 1928
- Completed: 1934

Specifications
- Materials: Reinforced concrete

Administration
- Province: Birmingham
- Archdiocese: Birmingham

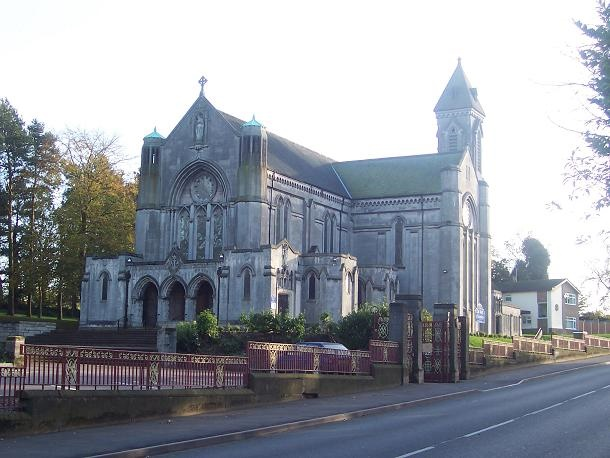
West end

Our Lady of Lourdes Church is the Roman Catholic parish church and shrine of Hednesford in Cannock Chase, Staffordshire, England. A Grade II listed building, it was built in 1928–34 together with a Lourdes grotto and is a diocesan shrine and pilgrimage church.

== Church ==
Our Lady of Lourdes Church was designed by the Birmingham ecclesiastical architect G. B. Cox in a free French Gothic style. It is constructed of reinforced concrete faced with white stone, with a platform and adjustable jacks in the crypts to mitigate subsidence from mining. The church is cruciform with an apsoidal east end (in actuality located in the south) and transepts each with the gable ends flanked by polygonal turrets and containing a rose window. On either side of the nave, paired lancet windows above two single-storey projecting chapels form the clerestory. The west end has a recessed arched window including a rose window, also flanked by polygonal turrets, above a projecting porch with triple arches; a side porch on the south and the former baptistery on the north, both single-storey with lancet windows, flank the porch. In the corner formed by the east transept and the chancel are a single-storey sacristy and a two-storey bell turret with a pyramidal roof which contains the organ gallery, reached by a stone spiral staircase. The ceiling is rib vaulted. The four side chapels have stained glass windows; two of the four windows in the apse are from the 1960s. There is a Lady chapel in the south transept. The Stations of the Cross are ceramics by Philip Lindsey Clark.

The church is surrounded by a stone wall topped with ornamental iron railings. The grounds include a Lourdes grotto and were laid out with wide paths and terraces; annual diocesan pilgrimages began in 1966.

== History ==
The previous Catholic church at Hednesford was dedicated to Saint Joseph and Saint Philomena and was built in the 1890s at Hill Top. The site of the current church was purchased in 1923 after a fundraising campaign, in order to fulfill the dream of the late priest, Father Patrick Boyle, of creating a replica of the grotto at Lourdes to be a pilgrimage destination for those who could not travel to France. The foundation stone was laid in 1928 and the church was completed in 1934 at a cost of more than £50,000. The Lourdes grotto was completed the following year.

The church was Grade-II listed on 9 May 2016. The grotto was also Grade-II listed on the same date.

== Gallery ==
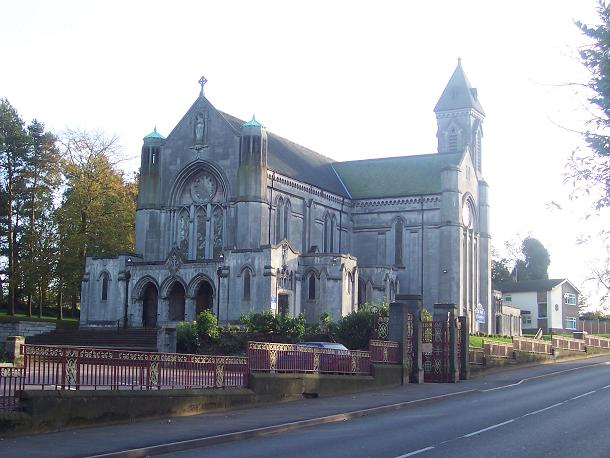
Exterior: Shrine and Parish Church

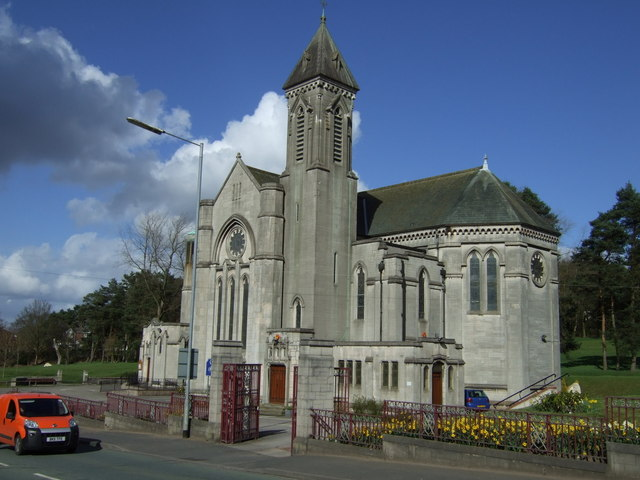
Exterior: Shrine and Parish Church

== See also ==
- Listed buildings in Hednesford
