= Listed buildings in Brindley Heath =

Brindley Heath is a civil parish in the district of Cannock Chase, Staffordshire, England. The parish contains four listed buildings that are recorded in the National Heritage List for England. All the listed buildings are designated at Grade II, the lowest of the three grades, which is applied to "buildings of national importance and special interest". All the listed buildings are stones marking the boundary between two parishes.

== Buildings ==
Name and location	Photograph	Date	Notes
Boundary Stone at Grid Reference SK 028168; 52.74895°N 1.96116°W	—	Late 18th century	The boundary stone is square with a round top, and marks the boundary of the parish of Horton with the parish of Rugeley.
Boundary Stone at Grid Reference SK 027166; 52.74833°N 1.96178°W	—	Late 18th century	The boundary stone is square with a round top, and marks the boundary of the parish of Horton with the parish of Rugeley.
Boundary Stone at Grid Reference SK 027165; 52.74775°N 1.96236°W	—	Late 18th century	The boundary stone is square with a round top, and marks the boundary of the parish of Horton with the parish of Rugeley.
Boundary Stone at Grid Reference SK 026164; 52.74711°N 1.96251°W	—	Late 18th century	The boundary stone is square with a round top, and marks the boundary of the parish of Horton with the parish of Rugeley.
