= Rob Finch =

English footballer (1908–2000)

Personal information
- Full name: Abel Roberts Finch
- Date of birth: 31 August 1908
- Place of birth: Hednesford, England
- Date of death: 2000 (aged 91–92)
- Height: 5 ft 8 in (1.73 m)
- Position: Full-back

Senior career*
Years	Team	Apps	(Gls)
1923–1924	Hednesford Primitives		
1924–1925	Hednesford Town		
1925–1938	West Bromwich Albion	216	(0)
1938–1939	Swansea Town	0	(0)
1939	Hednesford Town		
1946	Tamworth		
Total		216	(0)
- * Club domestic league appearances and goals

Abel Roberts Finch (31 August 1908 – 2000) was a footballer who played as a full-back.

He joined Hednesford Prims in 1922 and Hednesford Town in 1923. After only a few first-team games, he was approached by West Bromwich Albion, signing professional forms for them in 1925, making his debut at home to Leicester City, 27 February 1926, at the age of 17.

Finch made two England International trials, one of them for the Rest v England, opposite the great Dixie Dean. On 6 March 1937, he played against Arsenal in a 6th Round FA Cup game before 64,815 Hawthorn supporters. Transferred to Swansea in May 1939, Finch managed only one game before War was declared.

Finch made 216 senior appearances for Albion and 231 more for their Central League side, many as captain, winning Championship medals in 1926–27, 32–33, 33-34 and 34–35, but was unlucky in being out of the Albion team for most of the 1930–31 season when they won promotion from Division Two and the FA Cup in the same season.

Finch died locally in 2000, aged 92.
