= St Edward's Church, Selly Park, Birmingham =

Catholic Church of St Edward, Selly Park, Birmingham
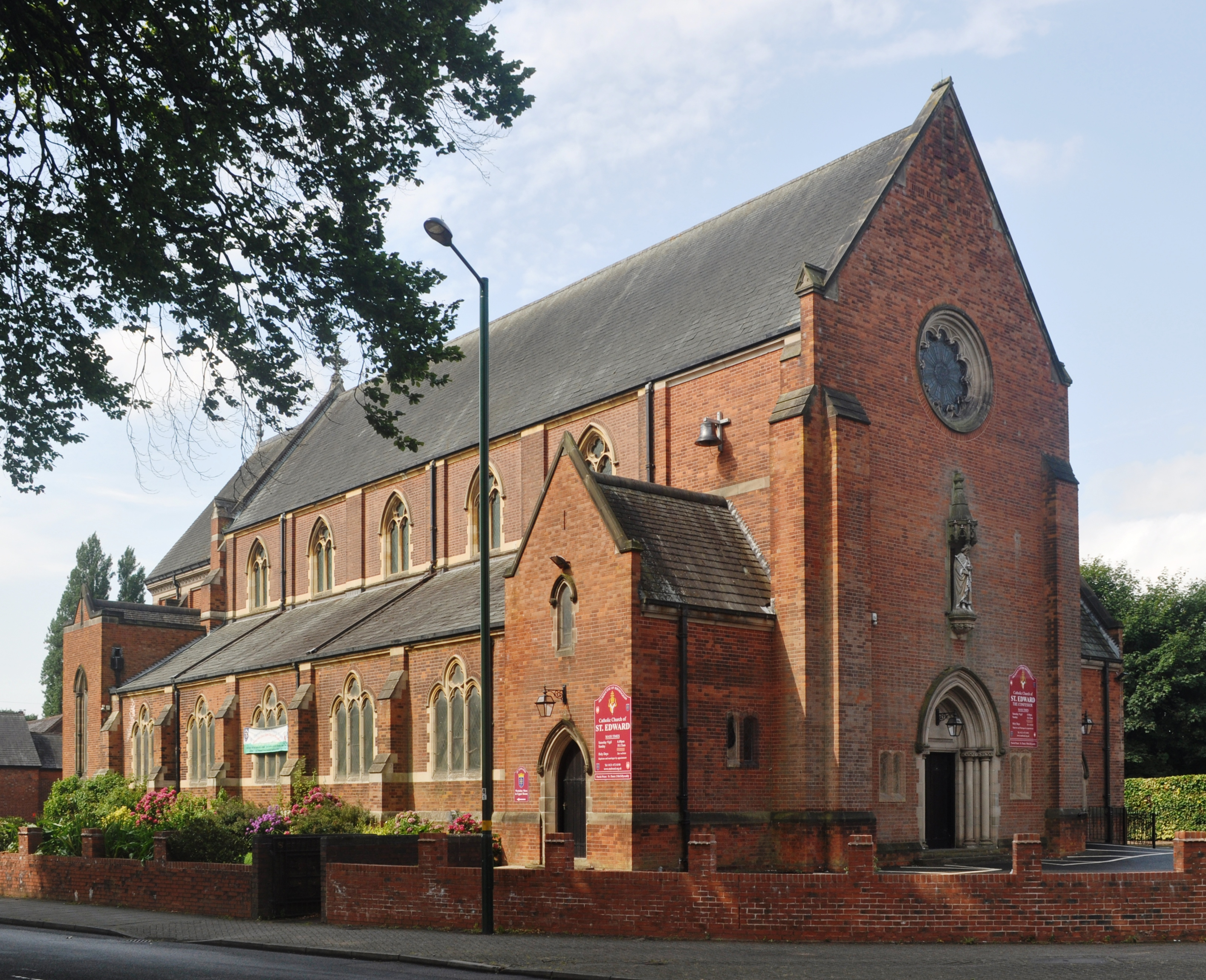
- The Catholic Church of St Edward, Selly Park, Birmingham, in August 2024
- Catholic Church of St Edward, Selly Park, Birmingham
- 52°26′25.61″N 1°55′32.40″W
- OS grid reference: SP 05138 82510
- Location: Selly Park
- Country: England
- Denomination: Roman Catholic
- Website: stedward.org.uk

Architecture
- Architect: Henry Thomas Sandy
- Completed: 13 October 1902

Administration
- Diocese: Roman Catholic Archdiocese of Birmingham
- Parish: Selly Oak

The Catholic Church of St Edward, Selly Park, Birmingham is a Roman Catholic parish located in Selly Park in the Archdiocese of Birmingham.

== History ==
The church on Raddlebarn Road was designed in decorated gothic style by Henry Thomas Sandy of Stafford and the nave opened on 13 October 1902 by Edward Ilsley, Roman Catholic Bishop of Birmingham and Samuel Webster Allen, Roman Catholic Bishop of Shrewsbury. The builder was William Bishop of King's Heath.

The sanctuary and side chapels were built between 1925 and 1926 in a design created by George Bernard Cox, of Harrison and Cox, and the builders were John Bowen and Sons of Balsall Heath.

The western end of the church was completed in 1936.
