= Chadsmoor =

Historic village in Staffordshire, England

Coordinates: 52.702°N 2.019°W

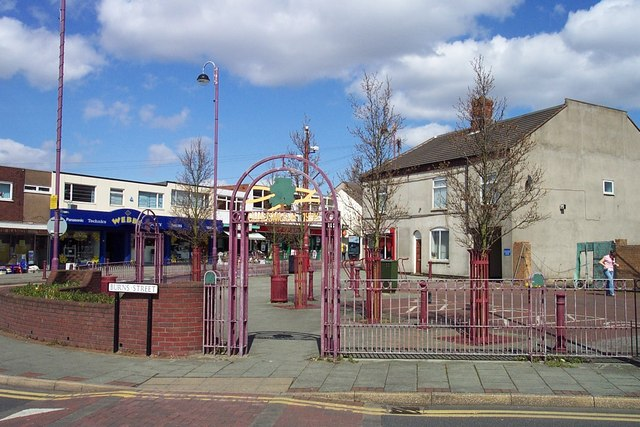

- Location within Staffordshire
- Area: 3.49 km^{2} (1.35 sq mi)
- Population: 14,410
  - Density: 4,129/km^{2} (10,690/sq mi)
- District: Cannock Chase
- Shire county: Staffordshire
- Region: West Midlands
- Country: England
- Sovereign state: United Kingdom
- Post town: CANNOCK
- Postcode district: WS11
- Dialling code: 01543
- Police: Staffordshire
- Fire: Staffordshire
- Ambulance: West Midlands
- UK Parliament: Cannock Chase

Chadsmoor (/ˈtʃædsmər/) is a historic village in the Cannock Chase District in Staffordshire, England, and is situated between the towns of Cannock and Hednesford.

== History ==
In the 7th century St Chad, the patron Saint of Lichfield Cathedral, visited a Fosse or a deep broad ditch located near the Telecom tower (track from Pottal Pool to Pye Green) and stopped at a gate 400 m from the Pye Green junction. From then on the area to the south was called “Chads – Moor”. However, Cameron. points out that -kirk toponyms more frequently incorporate the name of the dedicatee, so it is not so certain that Chadsmoor was named after the saint.

Chadsmoor centre was basically developed around 1875 when the West Cannock Colliery Company built 3 collieries on adjacent land and the East Cannock Colliery Company quickly followed. Lord Hatherton then developed Littleton Colliery to the West. The need for houses for the miners and their families then became a priority and the population of Chadsmoor exploded.

In 1858 the South Staffordshire Railway built a rail line initially linking Birmingham to Walsall and then to Cannock, Hednesford and Rugeley and onwards to the Trent Valley Line (now the West Coast main Line) The present day “Chase Line” still uses this route which goes through Chadsmoor. The stations at Hednesford & Cannock are just a short walk away. The “Chase Line” gives a regular service to Rugeley, Hednesford, Cannock, Bloxwich, Walsall, Great Barr and Birmingham.

By 1860 a large canal basin had been built on the Cannock Extension Line and this served as a base to move the produced coal direct to its sale areas such as Birmingham & London. The canal closed in 1965 and the old routes of the canal and associated tramways have been sympathetically landscaped.

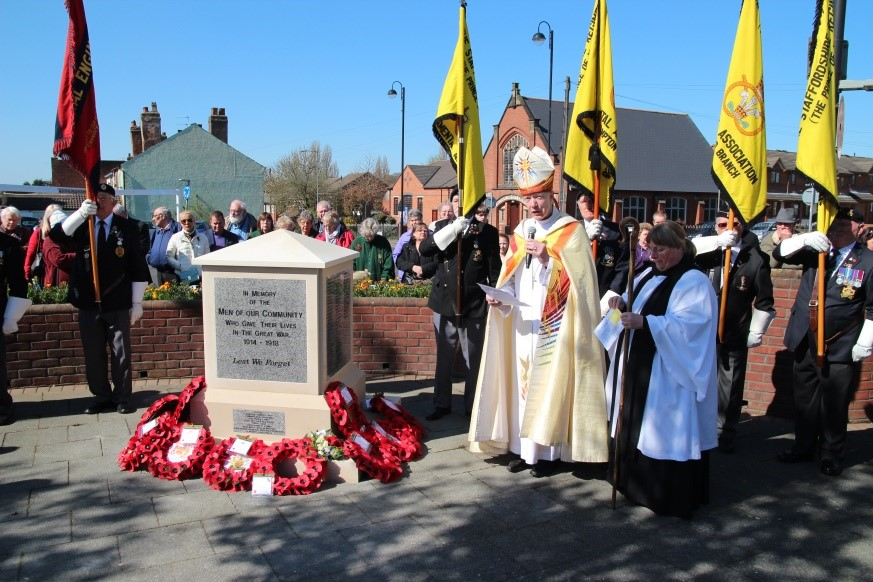
Dedication of Chadsmoor War Memorial.

In the First World War the miners of Chadsmoor made a substantial sacrifice for the country when more than 160 men lost their lives, many of them at the Somme, building tunnels under the German Lines, coincidentally doing the same work which they had left only weeks before. The Second World War saw a further 14 men lose their lives. The Chadsmoor History Society has in recent years built a Portland Stone memorial to commemorate all the names of the men who lost their lives. The stone was dedicated by the “Bishop of Wolverhampton” and the plaque by Major General John Henderson CB and this was funded by public subscription and small grants.

== Geography ==
Chadsmoor has an estimate area of 3.49 square kilometers and has an elevation of 170 meters above the sea level.

=== Climate ===
Chadsmoor has a moderate, temperate climate; with average temperatures varying from 5 °C on winter to 18 °C on summer. See Penkridge weather station for details of average temperature and rainfall figures taken between 1981 and 2010 at the Met Office weather station in Penkridge.

=== Location ===
The community comprises 2 wards (Cannock North & Cannock East). It is now, in 2017, a commuter area to the West Midlands Conurbation with a travel to work profile to the City of Wolverhampton (10 miles) and Birmingham (17 miles). The County town of Stafford is only 10 miles to the North and the City of Lichfield with its Three Spires Cathedral is 9 miles to the South.

== Demography ==
Chadsmoor, as of mid-2013 census, has a population of 14,410, distributed in 49.27% males and 50.73% females. Its population is older than the national mean (having averages of 40 and 39 respectively). As of 2011, its population, with 97.5% consisting of people born on the UK, was almost completely native

== Notable Natives/Residents ==
- Albert Stanley (1863-1915), miners Leader & MP for North West Staffordshire.
- Sydney Barnes (1873-1967), cricketer, died locally
- Roland Degg (1909-2001), DSO - Lieutenant Colonel, South Staffs Regiment.
- Arthur Hopcraft (1932-2004), author, dramatist and screenwriter, brought up locally.
- Tom Wakefield (1935-1996), novelist.
- Sir Steven Moss (born 1947), NHS Administrator, a long career in nursing

=== Sport ===
- Tom Galley (1915-2000), footballer, played over 200 games incl. 183 for Wolves and 2 for England
- Malcolm Beard (born 1942), footballer, played over 350 games, most for Birmingham City F.C.
- Brian “Nobby” Horton (born 1949), footballer who played 610 games and a Premiership Manager.
- Geoff Palmer (born 1954), played 460 games incl. 394 for Wolves
- Stan Collymore (born 1971), footballer, played over 287 games incl. 3 for England
