= Brookhill Tavern =

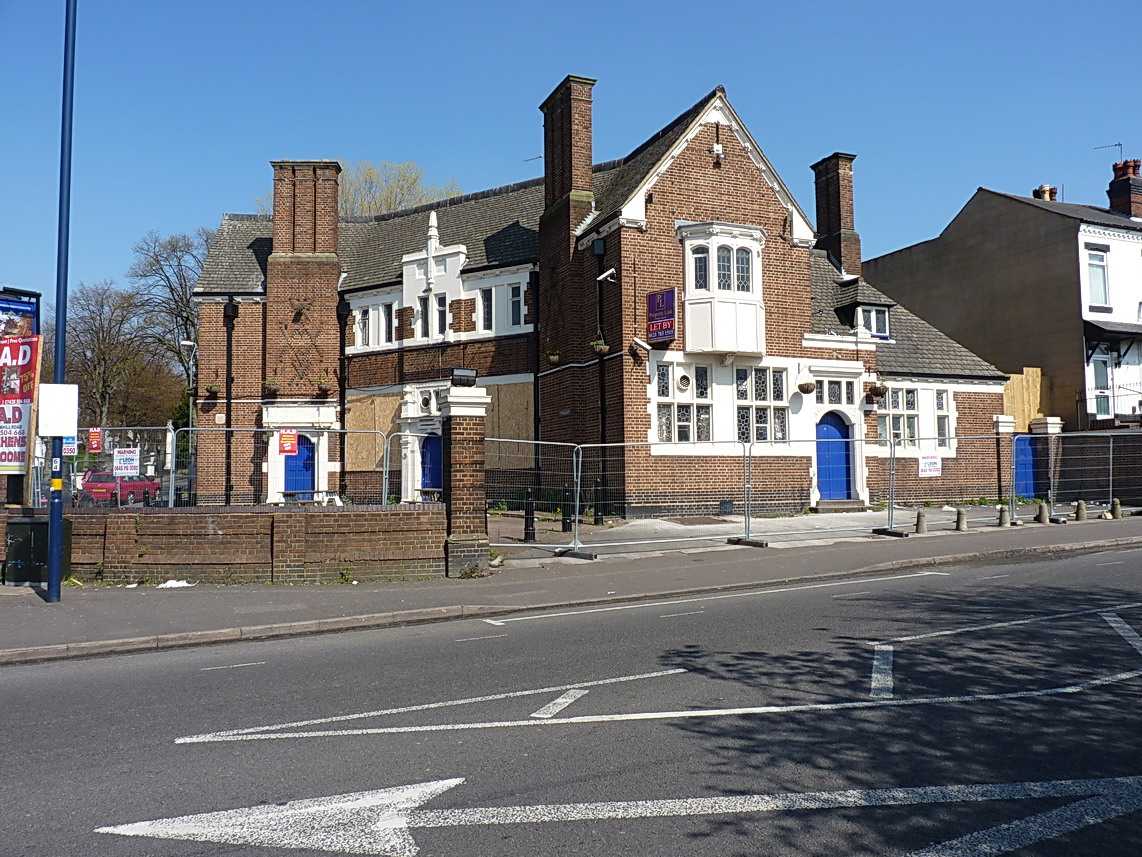
- Interactive map of the Brookhill Tavern area

General information
- Type: Public house
- Location: 484 Alum Rock Road, Alum Rock, Birmingham, England
- Coordinates: 52.487926°N 1.839052°W
- Opened: 1928
- Client: Mitchells & Butlers

Design and construction
- Architect: George Bernard Cox
- Architecture firm: Harrison and Cox
- Designations: Grade II listed

The Brookhill Tavern was a Grade II listed public house at 484 Alum Rock Road, Alum Rock, Birmingham, England B8 3HX.

It was built in 1927-1928 for the Smethwick-based Mitchells & Butlers Brewery. The architect was George Bernard Cox of Harrison and Cox.

It was Grade II listed in 2015 by Historic England.
