= Brindley Heath railway station =

Disused railway station in Brindley Heath, Staffordshire

Brindley Heath
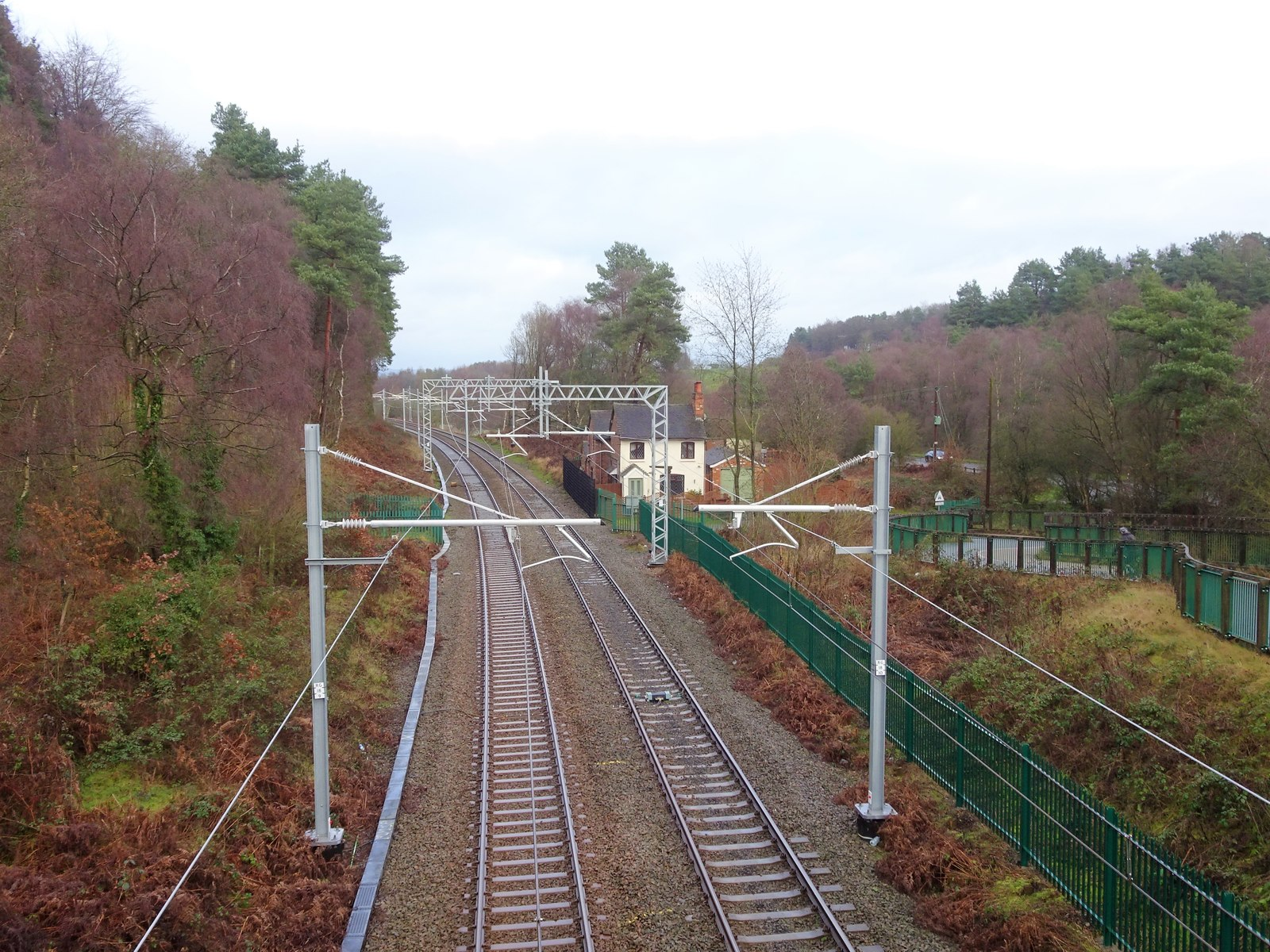
- Site of the station (2019)

General information
- Location: Brindley Heath, Staffordshire; England
- Coordinates: 52.7337°N 1.9676°W
- Grid reference: SK023150
- Platforms: 2

Other information
- Status: Disused

History
- Post-grouping: London, Midland and Scottish Railway

Key dates
- 3 August 1939: opened for Special trains
- 26 August 1939: Opened for regular passenger trains
- 6 April 1959: Closed
Location

Brindley Heath railway station served the civil parish of Brindley Heath, Staffordshire, England from 1939 to 1959 on the Chase Line.

== History ==
The station opened to the public on 26 August 1939 by the London, Midland and Scottish Railway, although it opened earlier on 3 August for Bank Holiday specials from the RAF base. It closed to both passengers and goods traffic on 6 April 1959. These dates correspond closely with the opening and closing of the nearby RAF Hednesford.

Preceding station	Historical railways	Following station
Rugeley Town	London, Midland and Scottish Railway; Chase Line	Hednesford
