= Church of Our Lady and St Rose of Lima, Weoley Castle =

Church of Our Lady and St Rose of Lima
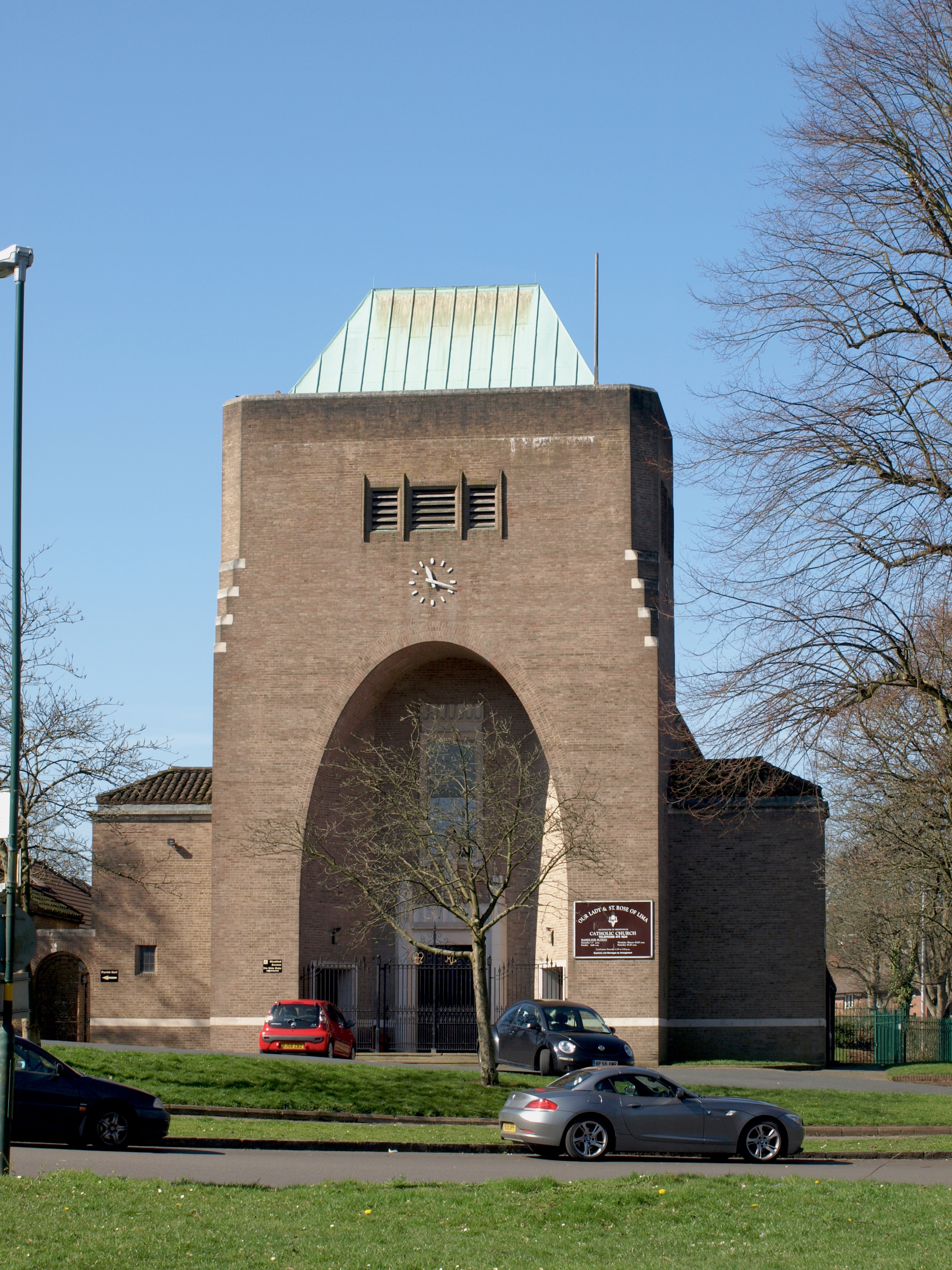
- Church of Our Lady and St Rose of Lima
- Church of Our Lady and St Rose of Lima
- 52°26′10.7″N 1°57′41.7″W
- OS grid reference: SP 02699 82042
- Location: Weoley Castle, Birmingham
- Country: England
- Denomination: Roman Catholic
- Website: www.strose.org.uk

History
- Dedication: Our Lady and St Rose of Lima

Architecture
- Architect: Adrian Gilbert Scott
- Groundbreaking: 18 July 1959
- Completed: Whit Monday 1961
- Construction cost: £75,000

Administration
- Diocese: Roman Catholic Archdiocese of Birmingham
- Parish: Weoley Castle

The Church of Our Lady and St Rose of Lima, Weoley Castle is a Roman Catholic parish in the Archdiocese of Birmingham.

== History ==
The parish was established in the early 1930s. The foundation stone for a parish hall was laid in 1933, adjacent to the site of the current church. It was designed by the architect George Bernard Cox. Services were held in the hall until a school was built in 1936.

The foundation stone for the church was laid on 18 July 1959. The building with seating for 500 people was designed by Adrian Gilbert Scott and the construction cost was £75,000 (equivalent to £1,517,210 in 2025). The church was blessed on Whit Monday 1961 by Archbishop Francis Grimshaw.

In February 2013, the building was assessed by English Heritage under the Planning Act 1990, but did not meet the criteria for listing. It is however locally listed at Grade A.

The High Altar was constructed in Blue Horton Stone from Banbury with an Italian Grey Marble top and plinth.

The wooden reredos scene above the Lady Altar was carved by Ferdinando Stuflesser, of Ortisei, Bolzano, Italy.
