= Selly Park Girls' School =

Coordinates: 52.4366°N 1.9186°W

Location
- 5 Selly Park Road; Selly Park; Birmingham, West Midlands, B29 7PH; England

Information
- Type: Community school
- Local authority: Birmingham City Council
- Department for Education URN: 103498 Tables
- Ofsted: Reports
- Head Teacher: Lisa Darwood
- Gender: Girls
- Age: 11 to 16
- Enrolment: 810 as of September 2025
- Website: https://sellyparkgirls.org/

Selly Park Girls' School (formerly Selly Park Technology College for Girls) is a secondary school located in the Selly Park area of Birmingham, in the West Midlands of England.

Selly Park Girls’ School is an 11–16 secondary school for girls located in Birmingham, England. The school has approximately 800 pupils and serves a diverse local community.

A significant proportion of pupils are eligible for the Pupil Premium and Free School Meals. Many pupils speak English as an additional language, and a proportion are identified as having Special Educational Needs and Disabilities (SEND). These characteristics influence the school’s curriculum design and pastoral systems.

The school states that its vision is for pupils to “Achieve, Belong and Thrive”. Its curriculum includes adaptive teaching approaches and targeted support for disadvantaged pupils, EAL learners and pupils with SEND.

Selly Park Girls’ School has been recognised as a Gold Trauma Informed School and a UNICEF Gold Rights Respecting School. The school offers a range of enrichment activities, including Forest School, equine‑assisted programmes, cultural visits and international partnerships. It has also received the International School Award.

The headteacher, Lisa Darwood, has worked at the school for over 20 years. Under her leadership, the school has received several awards, including Secondary School of the Year (2018 and 2022) and the Pearson Silver Secondary School of the Year at the National Teaching Awards. In 2025, the school also received a TES Staff Wellbeing Award.
