= Brindley Heath =

Heathland in Staffordshire, England

Coordinates: 52.729°N 2.006°W

Brindley Heath is an area of heath land on Cannock Chase situated between Hednesford and Rugeley in the Cannock Chase District of Staffordshire, England. The area also forms a civil parish, which at the 2001 census, had a population of 862, decreasing to 827 at the 2011 Census.

== History ==
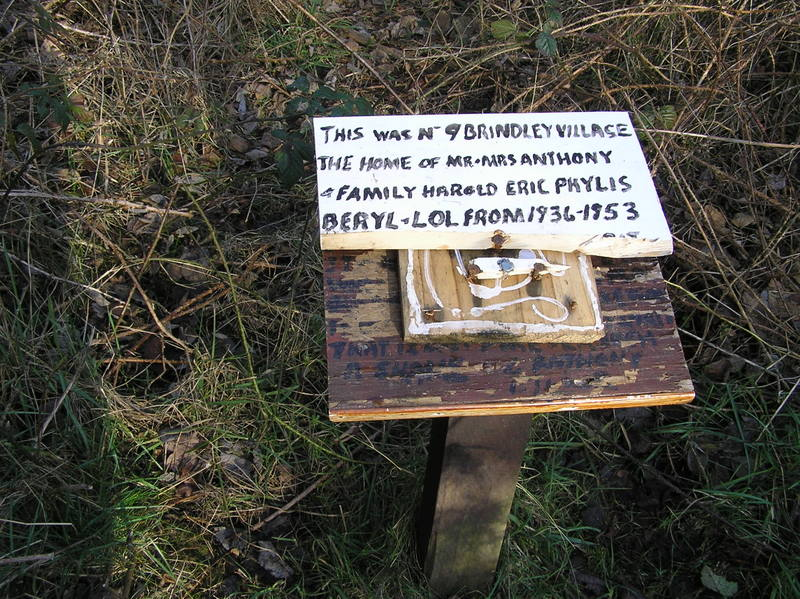
A hand made sign stating that number 9 Brindley Village stood on this spot and was the home of the Anthony family

There are remains of disused coal mines in a number of areas of Cannock Chase, including Brindley Heath.

The area has been used for many things including RAF Hednesford which was set up in 1938 as home to the 6th Technical Training School. In 1957 the camp was used to house around 900 Hungarian refugees. The camp was then demolished in 1960. The area was also used a tank training ground, leading to much soil disturbance.

A military hospital was built on the heath during World War I. After the hospital was closed in the 1920s, local miners moved onto the site and dubbed it Brindley Village. It was finally demolished around 1951, and the occupants moved to Hednesford. The parish electoral ward for the southern part of Brindley Heath parish is also named Brindley Village.

Brindley Heath railway station served Brindley Heath from 1939 to 1959 on the Chase Line

There was also a POW camp at Flaxley Green near Rugeley where the foundations can still be seen to this day.

== Flora ==
Brindley Heath is home to a high concentration of the relatively rare hybrid bilberry.

== See also ==
- Listed buildings in Brindley Heath
