= RAF Hednesford =

Former RAF base in Staffordshire, England

RAF Hednesford
- near Hednesford, Staffordshire, England

Site information
- Type: Training camp
- Open to the public: Yes as Cannock Chase Country Park

Location
- RAF Hednesford within Staffordshire
- Coordinates: 52.734°N 1.986°W

Site history
- Built: 1939
- In use: 1940–1956
- Demolished: 1970

Royal Air Force Hednesford or more simply RAF Hednesford is a former Royal Air Force station situated 7.5 miles (12.1 km) south-east of Stafford, Staffordshire, England.

== History ==
The RAF station of Hednesford was built just south of Cannock Chase, above the village of Hednesford in 1938/39, on land purchased from the Marquess of Anglesey. Ten officers and fifty other ranks arrived in mid-March 1939. It operated as No 6 School of Technical Training. Royal Air Force and Fleet Air Arm mechanics received technical training on a variety of airframes and engines. The first intake of trainees arrived in April 1939, transferred from RAF Halton. In June 1939 Sir Kingsley Wood, Secretary of State for Air, visited the camp, by which time it already had 1,700 trainees. Accommodation consisted of wooden barrack huts (over 200 of them at their peak). Three large "Hinaidi" hangars housed the instructional aircraft and there was a large steel-framed workshop building of 70,000 square feet (6,500 square metres). During the War it grew to accommodate 4,000 trainees and 800 staff. Although it had no proper airfield at least three instructional aircraft were flown in and landed on the camp sports field. Brindley Heath railway station on the Chase Line served the camp. The road from the railway halt to the camp was steep and acquired the name "Kitbag Hill". The last intake for No 6 School of Technical Training was in 1947. After that RAF Hednesford became a demobilization centre and transit camp, and then a despatch centre, preparing personnel for overseas postings.

In 1950 it reopened as No 11 School of Recruit Training where many National Servicemen received their basic training. It was the very first base for most of the personnel there during the 1940s and 1950s. Most of them were newly called up in the rank of AC2 (the very lowest rank in the RAF) for their two years National Service in the British armed forces. It was known as a "square bashing camp" in the vernacular. New recruits into the RAF were given their initial training, which included first learning of RAF parade ground drill with rifles, intensive physical fitness training, training in ground combat and defence under Non Commissioned Officers of the RAF Regiment and some education about the RAF and its history. Men while undergoing their basic training at Hednesford were accommodated in wooden barrack huts, each one housing about twenty men. As usual with any military basic training camp discipline was very much stricter than it would be at any normal operational or trade training camp. Recruits normally spent a period of eight weeks (later reduced to six weeks) on their training at Hednesford before being posted on to their "trade training" camp elsewhere in the United Kingdom. Thousands of conscripts went through its gates until 1956.

Ten days after the last passing out parade at RAF Hednesford, 800 refugees from Hungarian Uprising of 1956 moved in, the first batch of a total of some 1,200. The RAF initially helped with feeding arrangements although the camp was run by Staffordshire welfare services.

In 1958 the Air Ministry announced it planned to sell the site. In April 1959, a sale of all the moveable buildings and equipment on the site was arranged (except for the officer's mess, a small number of huts in the North-East corner). This included the large steel-framed workshop (which was rebuilt in nearby Chasetown) and the Hinaidi hangars. The site was neglected for many years. Various plans for the sale of the site fell through and it was becoming vandalised and dangerous with the air-raid shelters still remaining and increased subsidence from old mine-workings. In 1962 some of the site was cleared by 213 Field Squadron Royal Engineers (TA) from Cannock and 293 Squadron from Stafford. The remaining buildings (the former officers' mess) in the North-East corner of the site were used by the Army as "No 81 Week End Training Centre", used by Territorial and Cadet units (a caretaker's bungalow, firing range and some other buildings were added). In 1963 the camp was acquired by Staffordshire council who had the remaining air-raid shelters demolished and the mining subsidence filled in. Access to the site was restricted for some time to allow vegetation and wildlife to regenerate, although it was sometimes used for military training exercises and the training of police dogs. The week-end Training centre was closed. The whole old camp area is now part of Cannock Chase Area of Outstanding Natural Beauty with a visitor centre on the site (first opened in 1983).

== See also ==
- Brindley Heath
