= Selly Park =

Coordinates: 52.443597°N 1.920854°W

- Location within the West Midlands
- OS grid reference: SP053821
- Metropolitan borough: Birmingham
- Metropolitan county: West Midlands
- Region: West Midlands
- Country: England
- Sovereign state: United Kingdom
- Post town: BIRMINGHAM
- Postcode district: B29
- Dialling code: 0121
- Police: West Midlands
- Fire: West Midlands
- Ambulance: West Midlands
- UK Parliament: Birmingham Selly Oak

Selly Park is a residential suburban district in south-west Birmingham, England. The suburb of Selly Park is located between the Bristol Road (A38) and the Pershore Road (A441). Named after the parkland originally associated with Selly Hall, it was developed in the mid-nineteenth century. The area was formerly home to the BBC's Pebble Mill Studios and is the location of Selly Park Girls' School.

== Toponymy ==
Selly Park is named after the parkland that was originally associated with Selly Hall, now preserved within Selly Convent.

== History ==
Initially Selly Park was developed on the parkland around Selly Hall, whilst the land to the west of the Pershore Road (A441) was laid out for development in the mid nineteenth century with spacious plots and tree-lined streets, and where development is still restricted by covenant. On the other side of the Pershore Road, between it and Cannon Hill Park are several streets of superior c19 terraced housing, built by Grants, the principal local builder. One or two of the larger houses have been converted into offices and two small hotels.

== Governance ==
The suburb is in the Birmingham City Council ward of Bournbrook and Selly Park, and is represented by two Green Party councillors, Jane Baston and Corinne Fowler. Prior to 2018, it was part of the Selly Oak council ward, along with the districts of Bournbrook, Selly Oak, Ten Acres and a small part of Stirchley. It also comes under the Selly Oak local council constituency, which is managed by its own district committee, and comprises both the Selly Oak ward as well as the wards of Billesley, Bournville and Brandwood.

== Geography ==
The area of Selly Park stretches from the River Rea up the hill to St Stephens and Elmdon Road. The river is subject to flooding after heavy rainfall, despite recent amelioration works.

== Education ==
Selly Park is the location of Selly Park Girls' School, St Edwards Primary School, and Raddlebarn Primary School.

== Health ==
One of Birmingham Hospice's two sites is located on Raddlebarn Road in Selly Park. It was formerly known as Birmingham St Mary's Hospice, and opened in 1979.

== Religion ==
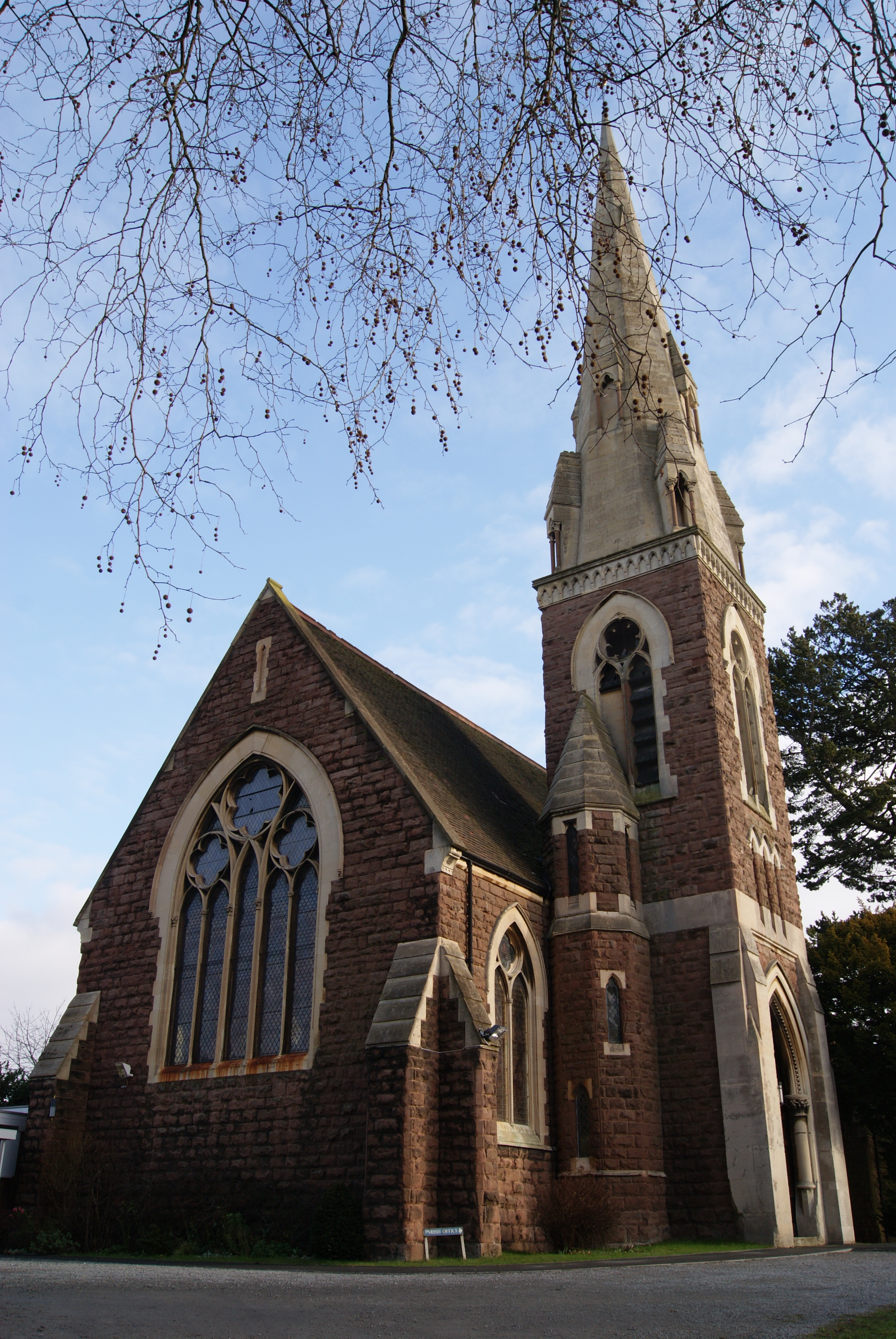
St Stephen's Church on Serpentine Road, Selly Park. An Anglican church, it is jointly managed with St Wulstan's Church in nearby Bournbrook.

St Edward's Church, Selly Park is the main local Catholic Church. Selly Park is also home to three Protestant Churches, namely St Stephen's Church, Christ Church, Selly Park and Selly Park Baptist Church.

== Television ==
The BBC's Pebble Mill Studios were located to the north of the region, before moving to The Mailbox in 2004.

Some episodes of "Dalziel and Pascoe" have been shot in Oakfield Road, An episode of "Bird of Prey" was filmed in Selly Wick Drive and various local shops and houses have been used in the soap opera of "Doctors". Episodes of "Nice Work", the TV drama series based on David Lodge's 1988 novel, were filmed in Sir John's Road.

== Notable residents ==
- W. H. Auden (1907–1973), who briefly lived in the grounds of Selly Wick House.
- Sir Richard Alfred Pinsent (1852–1948), 1st Baronet Pinsent of Selly Hill, 1938–1948, and former president of the Law Society, 1918–1919, who lived at Selly Wick.
- Phil Lynott (1949–1986), rock musician, was baptised in St Edwards Church and lived in the area as a child.

The economist P. Sargent Florence lived in Highfield House on Selly Park Road. The area is and was home to many academics from Birmingham University, such as Prof. Ivor Keys (1919–1995) and Dr Gordon Warwick (1918–1983), and to two former Olympic athletes, Audrey Court and Max Madders.

== Sporting history ==
Alex Higgins won his first snooker World Championship in 1972 at the British Legion Club in Selly Park. This was demolished around 2000 and is now a block of flats.
