= Kingsmead School, Hednesford =

Kingsmead School

Location
- Kings Avenue; Hednesford, Staffordshire, WS12 1DH; England; 52.7023°N 1.99513°W

Information
- Type: Academy
- Established: 1938
- Local authority: Staffordshire
- Department for Education URN: 142313 Tables
- Ofsted: Reports
- Headteacher: Paul Averis
- Gender: Coeducational
- Age: 11 to 18
- Enrolment: 1409 (capacity 1257)
- Houses: 4 Drakon, Phoenix, Gryphon, Pegasus
- Colours: orange, green, blue, purple,
- Website: http://www.kingsmeadschool.net/

Kingsmead School is a coeducational secondary school and sixth form. Established in 1938, it is in Hednesford, Staffordshire, England.

== History ==
Since its establishment in 1938, the school has had several name changes. Originally it was known as Littleworth School. In the early days there were separate boys' and girls' schools. During World War II, the school accommodated children who had been evacuated.

Subsequently, the title changed to Kingsmead Comprehensive School and then to Kingsmead High School. It was renamed Kingsmead Technology College when it became a specialist school in 2002.

The school was one of those selected in 2004 to test out a new Geography GCSE aimed at moving away from learning facts to understanding the big issues. Also in 2004 the then headteacher Julia Almond was appointed as Staffordshire's new deputy education director.

A student and teacher exchange programme were introduced in 1999 with teacher exchange visits with two Zambian schools – Helen Kaunda High School and Mukuba High School in Kitwe. This started a series of partnerships between Zambian and UK schools and there are now over 30 such school partnerships. Students from Kingsmead paid a visit to the Kitwe schools in 2005.

An investigation was held in September 2006 after leaflets promoting a series of 'adult' club nights for 11- to 16-year-olds, at Cannock's Civic Suite, were distributed outside the school.

== Academic standards ==
Absenteeism, authorised and unauthorised, is below both the local and national average by about a quarter.

In their report following the January 2006 inspection Ofsted rated the school as Satisfactory, point three on a four-point scale. In a special visit, in October 2007, to look at the provision of Religious Education, overall effectiveness for this subject was considered to be Good.

In 2015, OFSTED rated Kingsmead school Good. In 2018, OFSTED rated Kingsmead School Requires improvement.

== Sport ==
In April 1998, it was announced that a gymnasium would be built at the school to serve the whole of the West Midlands.

In September 2003, the school received £60,000 of lottery cash to improve the surfaces of its playing fields.

== Extracurricular activities ==
The school performed Macbeth on 3 July 2005 at The Prince of Wales Centre in Cannock as part of the nationwide Shakespeare festival organised by the BBC.

== Awards ==
The school has obtained Investor in People status.

== Notable former pupils ==
- Glamour model Jakki Degg was voted the nation's favourite Page 3 model and has also appeared on television shows including Fear Factor and The Weakest Link.
- Chris Overton played the Young Phantom in Joel Schumacher's 2004 The Phantom of the Opera. He subsequently took the part of Noah Claypole in Roman Polanski's 2005 remake of Oliver Twist.
- Liam McAlinden is a footballer for Rushall Olympic F.C. and previously played for League Two side Wrexham.
- Lily Walker, professional Hockey player for Great Britain Hockey and winner of Gold Medal in the 2022 Commonwealth Games in Birmingham.
