= St Catherine of Siena Church, Birmingham =

Church in Birmingham, England

St Catherine's Church
- St Catherine of Siena Church, Bristol Street
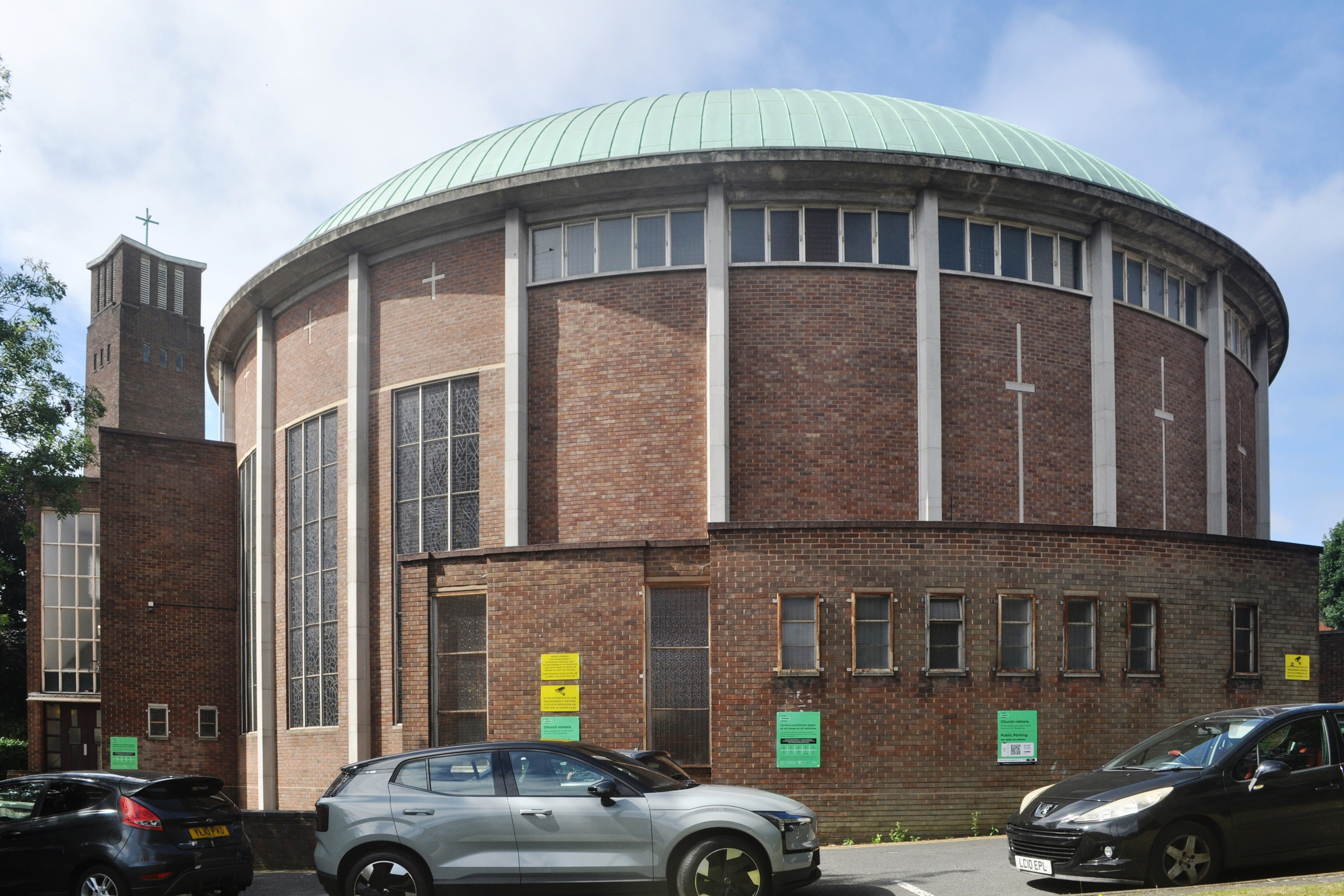
- The church in August 2024
- St Catherine's Church
- 52.472254°N 1.900385°W
- OS grid reference: SP 06863 86038
- Location: Birmingham
- Country: England
- Denomination: Roman Catholic
- Website: stcatherinesbirmingham.org

History
- Status: Active
- Founder: Bishop William Ullathorne
- Dedication: St Catherine of Siena
- Consecrated: June 1918
- Events: Replaced 1964

Architecture
- Functional status: Parish church
- Completed: 1965

Administration
- Province: Birmingham
- Archdiocese: Birmingham
- Deanery: Birmingham (Cathedral)

St Catherine of Siena Church is a parish of the Roman Catholic Church situated on Bristol Street in Birmingham, in the Archdiocese of Birmingham. Founded in 1874, its parish church was demolished and replaced in 1964. It was run by the Missionary Society of St. Columban from 2005 to 2013.

== History ==
=== Horse Fair ===
With the Roman Catholic population in Birmingham increasing in the 19th century, a Catholic school was built on Windmill Street in 1869 to provide an education for the new families in the area. Later, a new church had to be built to accommodate their needs. So on 30 April 1874, the foundation stone for a new Gothic revival church, St Catherine of Siena's, was laid in the Horse Fair part of the city by Bishop William Ullathorne of Birmingham. He also presided at the opening ceremony of the church on 28 September 1875. Originally, only the nave and sanctuary was built. By October 1893, the chancel, lady chapel and sacristy were ready and by 1909 the tower was completed. By 1918 the church was free of debt and consecrated in June that year. It was located where the Holloway Circus roundabout is situated on Bristol Street, Birmingham.

=== Bristol Street ===
On 1 June 1964, the church in Horse Fair was de-consecrated by Archbishop Francis Grimshaw of Birmingham, as the building was bought by the local council under a compulsory purchase order so that it could be demolished and a road system could be made in the area. This was part of the Inner Ring Road project. As well as the church, the surrounding old terraced housing was also demolished and replaced with council flats.

While a new church was being built, Mass was held in the nearby school. On 20 December 1964, the new church was opened. It is a circular domed building, with the altar in the centre of the church, making it compliant with the decrees of the Second Vatican Council. It was built on the corner of Irving Street and is made of brick and concrete. Inside the church, the Stations of the Cross are a memento from the old building.

== Present ==
From 2005, the church was administered by the Columban missionaries. In 2013, the Archdiocese of Birmingham again assumed administration of the parish.

Next door to the church is St Catherine of Siena Catholic Primary School, which has a close relationship with the church; preparing children for the sacraments of reconciliation, communion, and confirmation.

The parish hosts a Justice and Peace group and plays a role in the local Citizens UK organisation in Birmingham.

Next to the church is the presbytery which used to host the parish social centre. However, it has recently been used for a project involving the rehabilitation of young offenders.

== Exterior ==
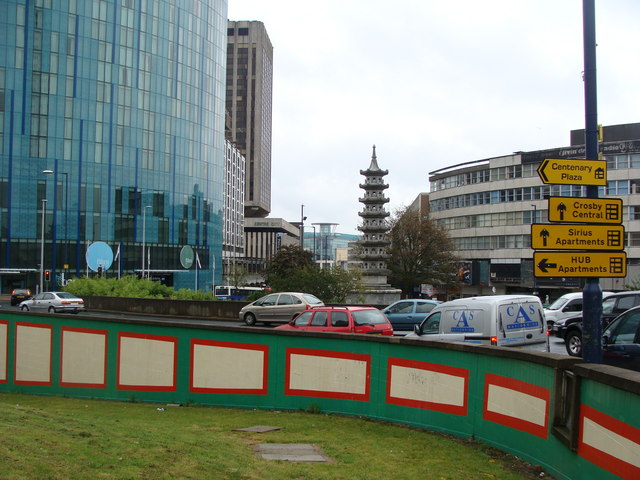
Location for previous church

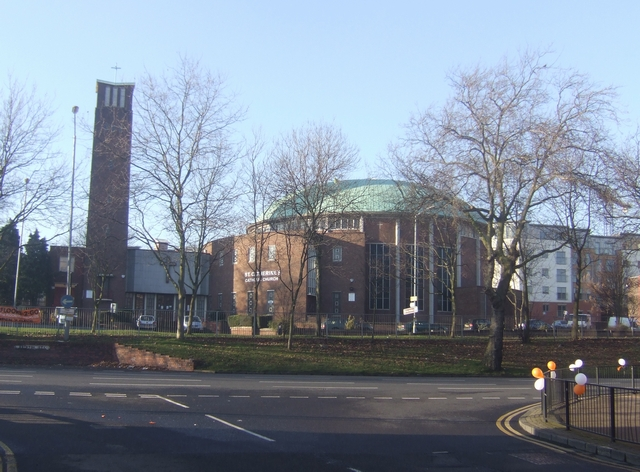
View from the road

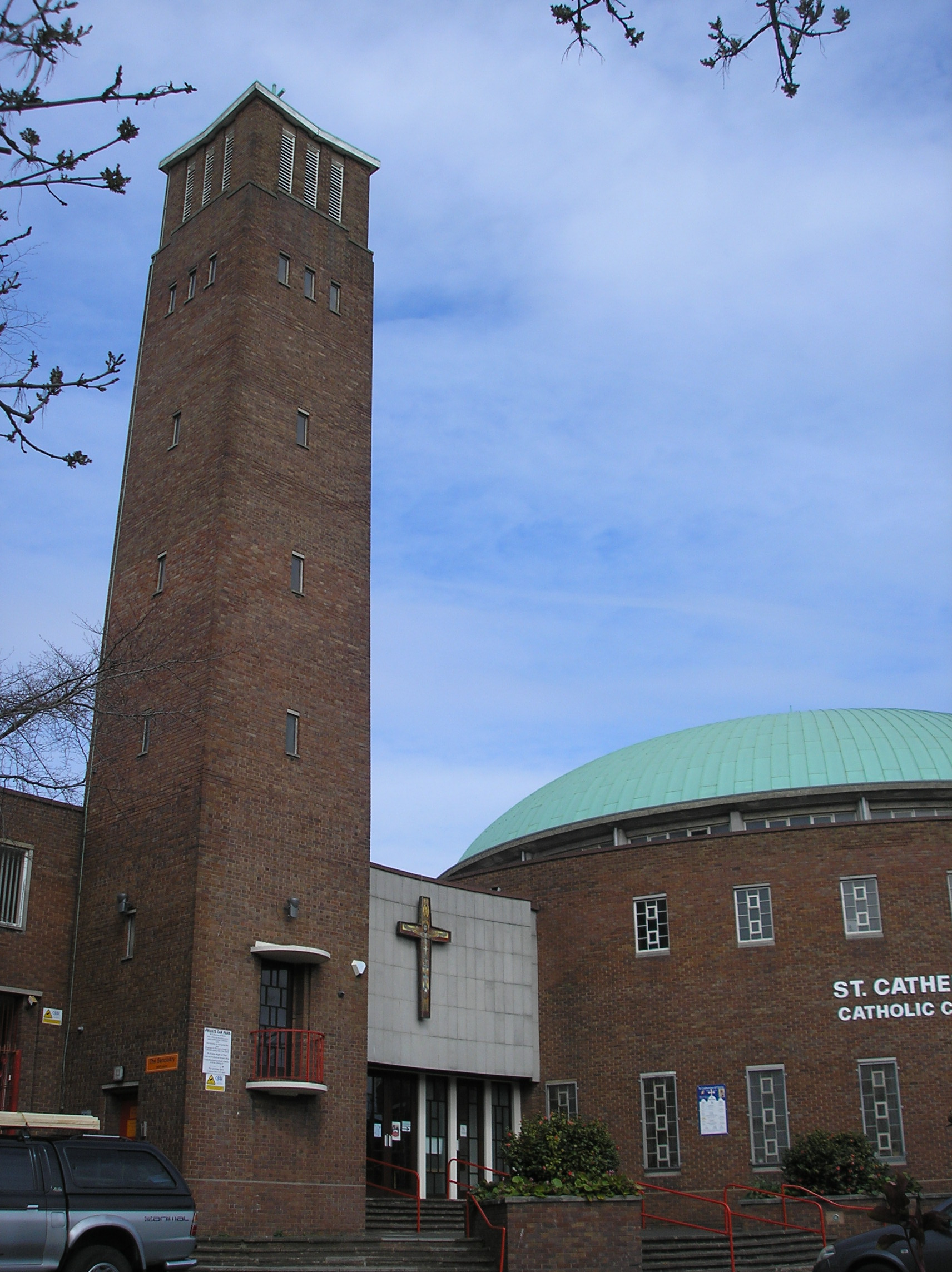
Church tower

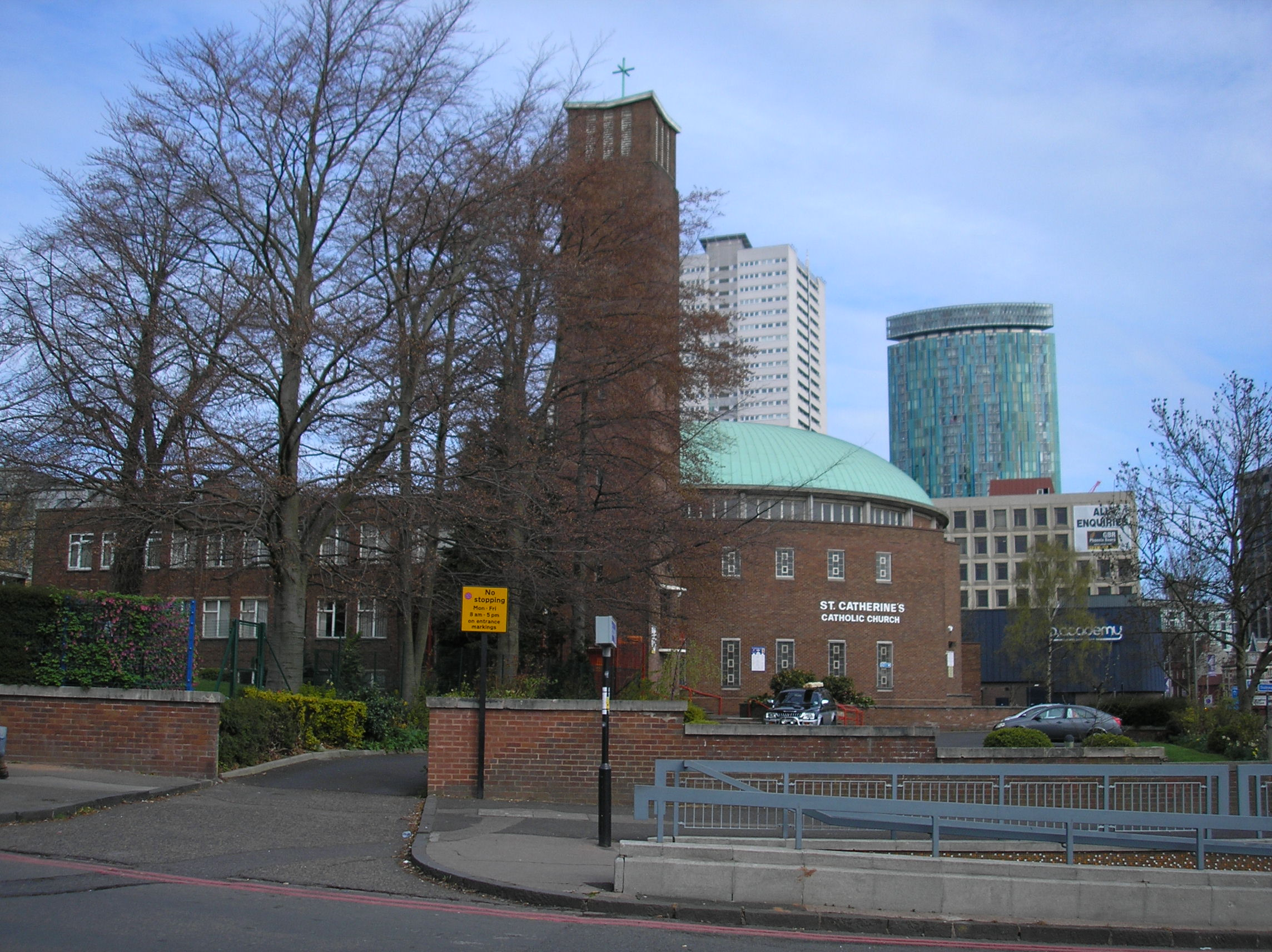
Side view

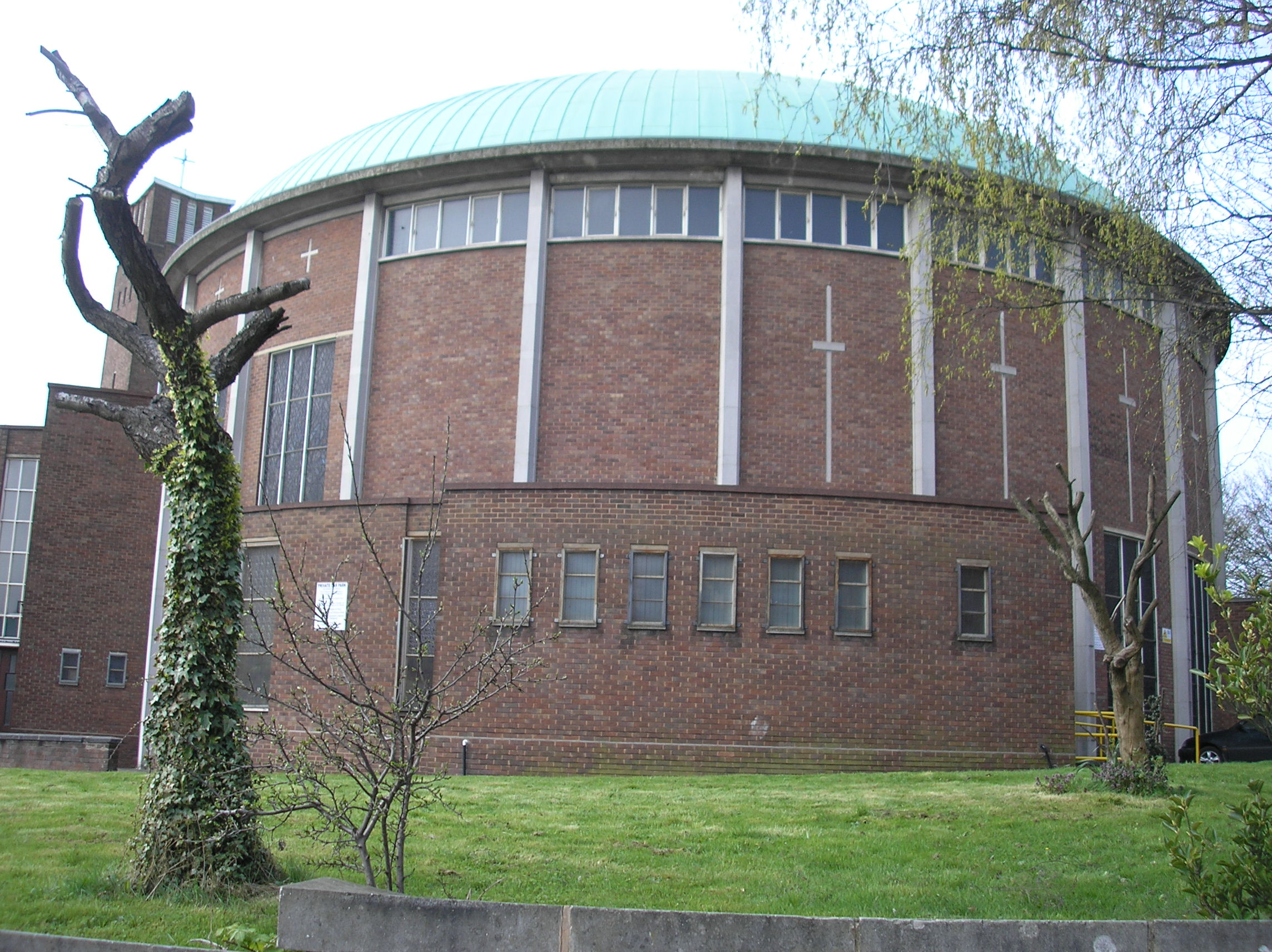
Exterior
