= Staffordshire University Academy =

Location
- Marston Road; Hednesford, Cannock, Staffordshire, WS12 4JH; United Kingdom
- Coordinates: 52°42′42″N 2°01′01″W

Information
- Type: Academy
- Local authority: Staffordshire County Council
- Trust: Staffordshire University Academies Trust
- Department for Education URN: 137164 Tables
- Ofsted: Reports
- Principal: Rowena Hillier
- Gender: Coeducational
- Age: 11 to 18
- Enrolment: 852
- Website: http://www.staffordshireuniversityacademy.org.uk/

Staffordshire University Academy is a secondary school and sixth form located in Marston Road, Hednesford, Cannock, Staffordshire, England. The school is sponsored by Staffordshire University and is part of Staffordshire University Academies Trust. The academy's mission is to ensure that students are able to achieve the very best life chances. Rated as 'Good' by Ofsted in October 2023, the school is popular and oversubscribed.
