= Hednesford =

Market town in Staffordshire, England

Coordinates: 52.7115°N 2.0006°W

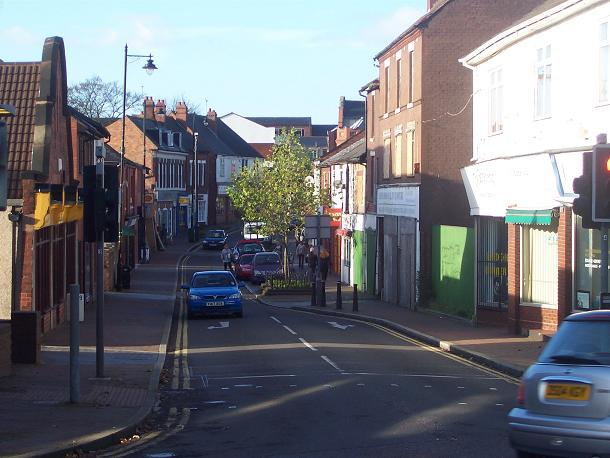
- Market Street, Hednesford

- Location within Staffordshire
- Population: 18,718 (2021 Census)
- OS grid reference: SK000126
- District: Cannock Chase
- Shire county: Staffordshire
- Region: West Midlands
- Country: England
- Sovereign state: United Kingdom
- Areas of the town (2011 census BUASD): List: Bradbury; Chadsmoor (part); Church Hill; Green Heath; Hazelslade; Huntington (part); Pye Green; Rawnsley; Wimblebury
- Post town: CANNOCK
- Postcode district: WS12
- Dialling code: 01543
- Police: Staffordshire
- Fire: Staffordshire
- Ambulance: West Midlands
- UK Parliament: Cannock Chase

Hednesford (/ˈhɛnsfərd/ HENSS-fərd is a market town and civil parish in the Cannock Chase district of Staffordshire, England. The Cannock Chase area of natural beauty is to the north of the town. Hednesford is also 1 mile (1.6 km) to the north of Cannock and 5 miles (8.0 km) to the south of Rugeley. The population at the 2011 census was 17,343.

== Toponymy ==
Hednesford was first recorded as Hedenedford in AD 1153. The town has seen progressive name evolution over the last millennium, with the name being variously documented as Ed(e)nesford, Adnesford, Hedg(e)ford, and Hednesford.

The etymology of the placename is likely "The ford of Heddīn", Heddīn being an Old English diminutive form of the given name Headda.

== History ==
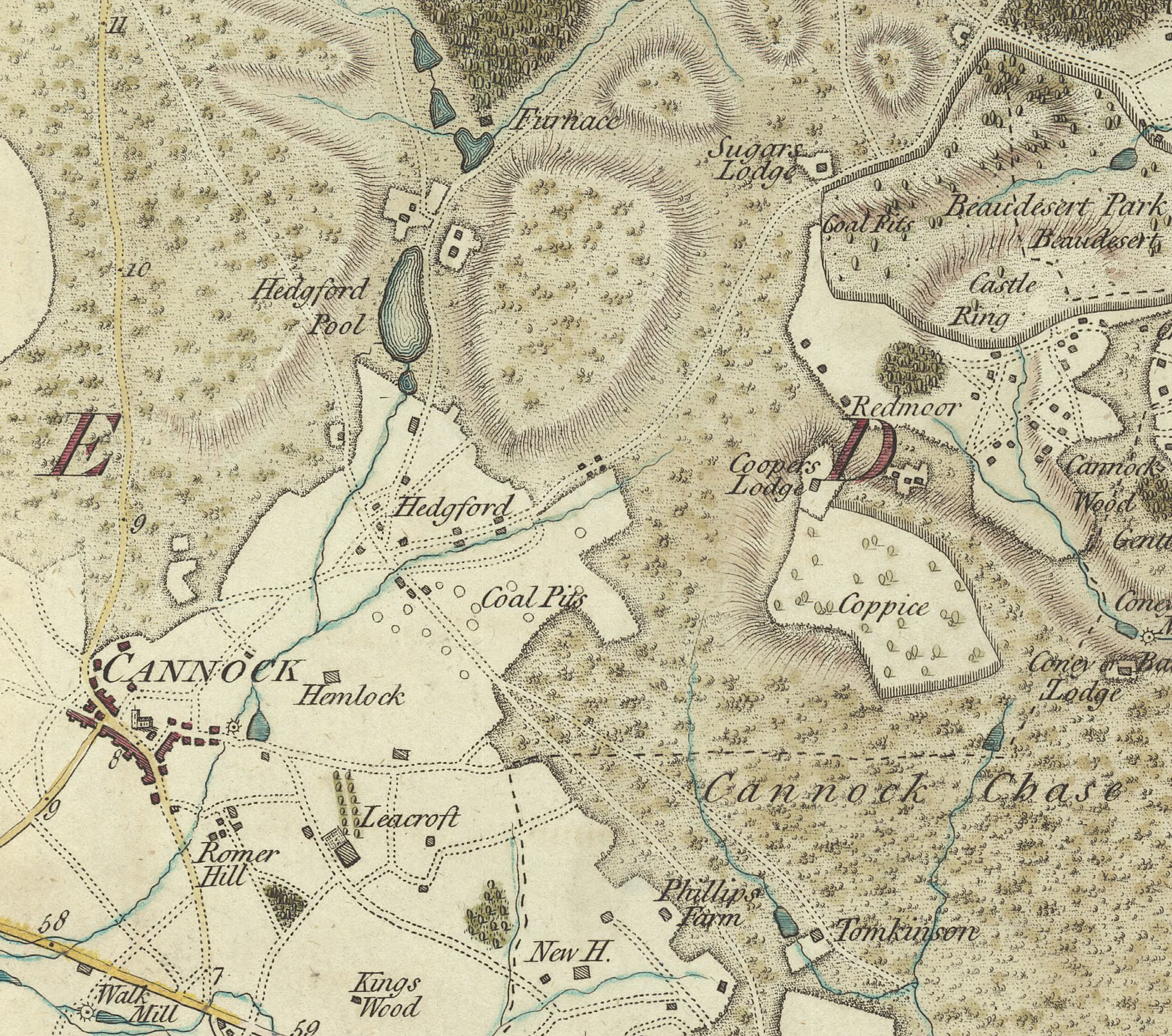
An excerpt from William Yates' 1775 map of the County of Stafford, centred around Hednesford (then Hedgford)

The first recorded mention of Hednesford dates back to 1153, when King Stephen granted an exemption of pannage dues to the small hamlet of Hedenedford.

The town can be found on William Yates' 1775 map of Staffordshire (pictured), showing it as a small village with 13 buildings.

Hednesford developed as a coal mining town in the second half of the 19th century, with the opening of the Uxbridge Pit.

The Valley Pit (first called the Pool Pit) in Hednesford town centre opened in the 1870s. To prevent this pit from flooding, the Cannock & Rugeley Colliery Company diverted the brook that fed Hednesford Pool (pictured on the 1775 map). This led to the pool drying up by 1900. In 1931, the site was reopened as Hednesford Park.

Between 1914 and 1918 two army training camps were built in the area, and over half a million British and Commonwealth troops passed through destined for the Western Front of World War I.

In 1939, the Royal Air Force opened the No. 6 School of Technical Training, later known as RAF Hednesford. It was used to train technicians in the maintenance and repair of airframes and engines for World War II. The camp ceased operations in 1956, and was repurposed for the resettlement of refugees fleeing from the Hungarian Revolution of the same year. The site is now a part of the Cannock Chase Area of Outstanding Natural Beauty (AONB).

Economically, Hednesford has experienced widespread changes since the 1980s due to the decline of mining and manufacturing jobs in the region. However, Cannock Chase district has seen prolonged job growth in recent years.

A £50 million regeneration was completed in 2012, with two new developments: Victoria Shopping Park, with a Tesco store being the anchor tenant, and Chase Gateway, containing an Aldi and a new bingo hall, along with several other shops. A new drill hall for the local Army Cadet Force detachment was also constructed.

The town was awarded a £2.2 million grant from the Heritage Lottery Fund in 2012 to refurbish Hednesford Park, including the construction of a new skatepark and play area. Work was completed in 2019.

== Governance ==
Hednesford falls under Cannock Chase district in the county of Staffordshire. The town is divided into three wards: Hednesford Green Heath, Hednesford North, and Hednesford South. The town is also parished and run by Hednesford Town Council. At the parish level, it is split into a different set of three wards: Pye Green, Anglesey, and West Hill.

At the national level, the town is represented under Cannock Chase constituency. Since 2015, this has been by Conservative Party MP Amanda Milling.

== Geography ==
Hednesford is situated 16 miles (26 km) north-northwest of Birmingham. The town centre is 160 metres (520 ft) above sea level, but parts of Pye Green reach up to 232 metres (761 ft) above sea level. No major rivers run through Hednesford, and the nearest large body of water is Chasewater, 3 miles (4.8 km) to the southeast. The town is surrounded to the north and west by Cannock Chase, a large, mixed area of countryside and Area of Outstanding Natural Beauty. The town is situated on the Cannock Chase Coalfield.

Just north of the town centre lies Hednesford Park, a mixed-use recreational area with a play area, skatepark, cafe, and tennis courts, and to the east of the town centre, the Hednesford Hills Nature Reserve. Hednesford has several other nature reserves, including the Anglesey Nature Reserve 750 yards (0.69 km) to the southwest of the town centre, and the Old Brickworks Nature Reserve 1 mile (1.6 km) to the southeast.

The town's main road connection is the A460 road, running from Wolverhampton in the south to Rugeley in the north. The town is also bisected by the Chase Line, a heavy rail line running from Birmingham New Street to Rugeley Trent Valley.

The urban area of Hednesford now spreads across a swathe of the northern fringe of Cannock, from Pye Green across to Heath Hayes, and is the southern gateway to the Cannock Chase AONB.

== Demography ==
=== Town ===
In the decade to 2011 the number of dwellings in the town rose by 7.8% to 7,482. Of the town's 7,277 households in the 2011 census, 25.9% were one-person households including 10.7% where that person was 65 or over. 69.3% were one family with no others (8.2% all pensioners, 39.5% married or same-sex civil partnership couples, 12.6% cohabiting couples and 9.1% lone parents). 29.9% of households had dependent children including 3.4% with no adults in employment. 72.4% of households owned their homes outright or with a mortgage or loan.

Of the town's 14,206 residents in the 2011 census aged 16 and over, 30.6% were single (never married), 51.3% married, 0.15% in a registered same-sex civil partnership, 2.4% separated, 9.0% divorced and 6.5% widowed. 26.0% had no formal qualifications and 50.0% had level 2+ qualifications (meaning 5+ GCSEs (grades A*-C) or 1+ 'A' levels/ AS levels (A-E) or equivalent minimum).

77.3% of the 6,597 men aged 16 to 74 were economically active, including 50.2% working full-time, 5.4% working part-time and 14.6% self-employed. The male unemployment rate (of those economically active) was 6.6% (See also Male unemployment). 67.2% of the 6,515 women aged 16 to 74 were economically active, including 31.9% working full-time, 25.4% working part-time and 3.5% self-employed. The female unemployment rate (of those economically active) was 4.7%.

Of people in employment aged 16 to 74, 14.3% worked in basic industries (ONS categories A, B, and D-F including 12.2% in construction), 13.9% in manufacturing, and 71.8% in service industries (ONS categories G-U including 19.6% in wholesale and retail trade and vehicle repair, 11.9% in health and social work, 8.0% in education, 6.0% in public administration, 5.9% in transport and storage, 4.5% in administrative and support service activities, and 4.0% in accommodation and catering). While 16.9% of households did not have access to a car or van, 84.6% of people in employment travelled to work by car or van.

79.1% of residents described their health as good or very good. The proportion who described themselves as White British was 96.9%, with all white ethnic groups making up 97.9% of the population. The ethnic make-up of the rest of the population was 0.88% mixed/multiple ethnic groups, 0.56% Indian/Pakistani/Bangladeshi, 0.18% Chinese, 0.15% other Asian, 0.28% Black and 0.046% other. 2.2% of Hednesford's residents were born outside the United Kingdom.

The responses to the voluntary question "What is your religion?" were 'No religion' (23.3%), Christian (69.8%), Buddhist (0.18%), Hindu (0.17%), Jewish (0.006%), Muslim (0.21%), Sikh (0.21%) and other religion (0.26%). 5.9% gave no answer.

=== Civil parish ===
The civil parish of Hednesford constitutes 96.8% of the population of the town. In the 2011 census it had 16,789 residents, 7,239 dwellings, and 7,058 households.

== Economy ==
The majority of Hednesford's working population works in the service industry. Hednesford, along with other towns in Cannock Chase district, is primarily a commuter town, with 8,655 more people commuting out of Cannock Chase than into Cannock Chase every day. Commuters primarily travel to nearby towns and cities such as Lichfield, Walsall, Stafford and Birmingham.

Large employers in the town include the Tesco in Victoria Shopping Park, employing 220 people, as well as an Amazon fulfillment centre located in Rugeley which employs 1000 permanent staff members. Amazon contracts a daily National Express West Midlands bus which runs from Willenhall to the fulfillment centre through Hednesford.

Historically, coal mining was a very important industry in Hednesford, employing thousands of people in the area with upwards of 48 coal mines on Cannock Chase Coalfield. Coal production decreased locally as well as nationally throughout the 1970s and 1980s, and the last coal mine on the coalfield, Littleton Colliery, closed in 1993.

== Landmarks ==
Hednesford has a war memorial unveiled by Princess Alice, Countess of Athlone in 1922, built for victims of World War I. It now also commemorates soldiers who were lost in World War II, the Korean War, and the British campaign in Northern Ireland. The town is also situated 2.5 miles (4.0 km) south-southeast of the Cannock Chase German Military Cemetery, housing almost 5000 identified German casualties of World War I and II.

The town centre of Hednesford is home to a miners' memorial. 3,500 miners are commemorated on individual bricks on a wall topped with a model of a Davy lamp, as well as placed into the ground surrounding Hednesford's clock tower.

Several listed buildings are located in Hednesford. For example, the Cross Keys Inn opened in Hednesford as a coaching station in 1764, and the building was Grade II listed in 1973. The building is now a public house. The town also has a Grade II listed Roman Catholic church, Our Lady of Lourdes, finished in 1934.

The town also houses the Museum of Cannock Chase, built on the site of the former Valley Colliery. The museum is dedicated to the history of coal mining in the region but also hosts community events. It is operated by the Wigan Leisure and Culture Trust.

Hednesford lies 3 miles (4.8 km) west of the ruins of Beaudesert Hall, formerly one of the family seats of the Marquesses of Anglesey. Demolition began in 1935 but was never completed, and today the site is used for recreation by scouting groups. Another part of the estate has since been turned into the Beau Desert Golf Club.

== Transport ==
Hednesford railway station was re-opened in April 1989 by British Rail. It is on the Chase Line, with routes run by West Midlands Railway between Rugeley Trent Valley and Birmingham International railway stations.

Hednesford is served by a number of bus routes operated by Chaserider (25, 26, 62, 63) and Select Bus Services (23), which run through the town centre interchange on Victoria Street. These provide connectivity to Cannock, Heath Hayes, Wimblebury, Chadsmoor, Rugeley, Lichfield, Uttoxeter and Rodbaston.

Hednesford's original bus station located off Victoria Street closed in 2012. The site was then used for the construction of Victoria Shopping Park.

== Media ==
Local news and television programmes are provided by BBC West Midlands and ITV Central. Television signals are received from the Sutton Coldfield TV transmitter.

Local radio stations are BBC Radio WM, Capital Mid-Counties, Heart West Midlands, Greatest Hits Radio Birmingham & The West Midlands, Smooth West Midlands, Hits Radio Birmingham and Cannock Chase Radio FM, a community radio station that broadcast from Bridgtown.

The town is served by the local newspaper, Express & Star.

== Education ==
Kingsmead School, previously known as Kingsmead Technology College, and Staffordshire University Academy, previously known as Blake High School and Blake Valley Technology College, are both secondary schools for pupils aged 11–18 that serve the area. Both schools have academy status. Hednesford Valley High School is a school for children with special educational needs, which services the local and wider areas.

Hednesford also contains 5 primary schools, with several others located in neighbouring towns.

== Sport ==
The town is located near Hednesford Hills Raceway, a stock car track built on the site of a disused reservoir in the 1950s.

The town's semi-professional football team, Hednesford Town F.C., nicknamed "the Pitmen", currently play in the Northern Premier League - Premier Division and won the FA Trophy in 2004. The team was almost unable to participate in the 2023/24 season due to a planned transfer of ownership falling through.

The town's most prominent sportsperson is former footballer Brian Horton, who played for the Pitmen in the late sixties and early seventies. After a long professional career, he went on to manage Manchester City, Macclesfield Town and Port Vale amongst others.

== Notable people ==
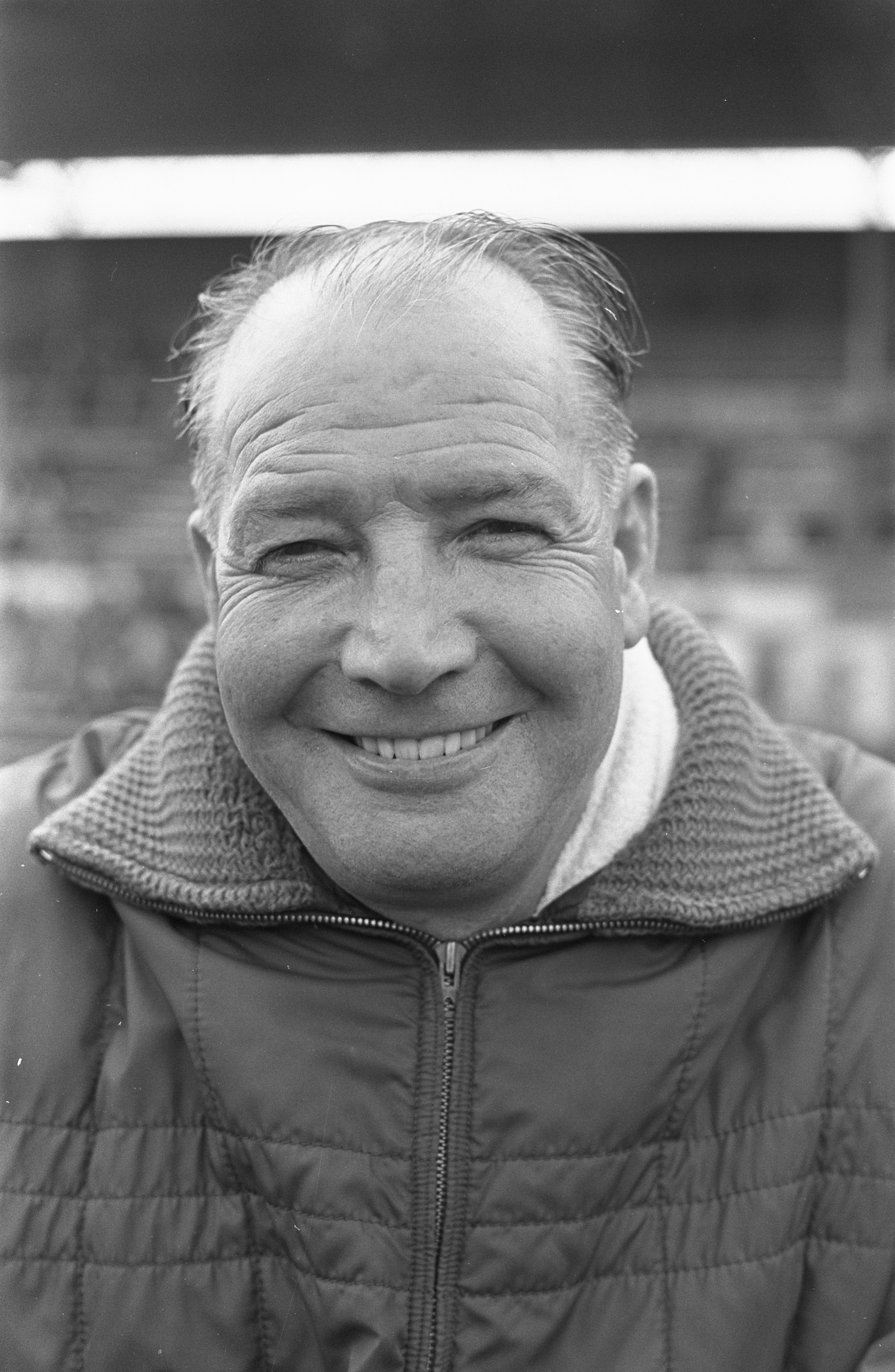
Leslie Talbot, 1968

- Lynda Grier, (1880–1967), educational administrator, policy advisor, and principal of Lady Margaret Hall, Oxford
- George Henry Jones (1884–1956), trade unionist and local politician
- Thomas Hughes (1885-1942), World War I Irish Victoria Cross recipient
- Lieutenant-General Sir Alan Reay (1925–2012), senior British Army officer, Director General Army Medical Services 1981–1984
- Phil Ford (born 1960), screenwriter
- David Picken (born 1963), Anglican priest, Archdeacon of Lancaster since 2020
- Kate Walsh (born 1982), business woman, runner-up in BBC's The Apprentice in 2009

=== Sport ===
- Tom Lyons (1885–1938), footballer with 289 caps, and cricketer for Staffordshire
- Harry Rogers (1889–1956), cricketer who played for Worcestershire
- Rob Finch (1908-2000), association football player with 216 senior appearances for West Bromwich Albion
- Harry Lane (1909–1977), professional footballer who scored 74 goals in 271 appearances
- Les Talbot (1910–1983), professional footballer with over 200 appearances
- Tom Galley (1915–2000), international footballer with over 200 caps, mainly for the Wolverhampton Wanderers
- Brian Horton (born 1949), former footballer, with over 600 appearances

== See also ==
- Listed buildings in Hednesford
