= Shades of Black (disambiguation) =

Shades of black are colors that differ only slightly from pure black.

Shades of Black may also refer to:

- Shades of Black (organisation), a community organisation in the Handsworth area of Birmingham, England
- Shades of Black (EP), an EP by Solomon
- Shades of Black: The Conrad Black Story, a 2006 Canadian biographical film

== See also ==
- Black (disambiguation)
- Shade (disambiguation)
- Off-white (disambiguation)
