= Stechford Baptist Church =

- Stechford Baptist Church
- 52°28′58.6″N 1°48′50″W
- Location: Birmingham
- Country: England
- Denomination: Baptist

Architecture
- Groundbreaking: 1906
- Completed: 1926

Stechford Baptist Church is a small Baptist church in the Stechford area of Birmingham, England and is notable for a 40-year history of combating racism and promoting community cohesion in a British urban-deprived setting. In the vanguard of attempts from the 1960s to engage immigrant Caribbean communities within mainstream indigenous churches, it played a key role in opposing the National Front during the 1970s. By the 1980s and 1990s it achieved a 50%/50% balance of indigenous and non-indigenous membership and leadership, thereby contrasting sharply with a UK tendency towards majority-white and majority-black churches, where splits are typically in the 90/10 ratio. During the 1990s the church developed relationships with a number of black-led community groups which had grown out of the 1985 Handsworth riots (which also included Stechford), and from 2000 the church worked to support asylum-seeker rights. One of the church leaders, Mrs E C McGhie-Belgrave, was awarded the MBE in 2002 and subsequently the Queen's Golden Jubilee Award in 2004 for her contribution to community cohesion and Black-White issues in Birmingham.

== History ==
Stechford Baptist Church preserves a complete set of written minutes from the date of its founding. A history of Stechford Baptist was commissioned by community organisation Shades of Black in 1998. The church was established in 1906, beginning meetings at the Council Schools and subsequently in the Masonic Hall. The present building, a Canadian timber frame and asbestos panel structure, was erected in 1926 on a larger plot of land acquired by the church. The timber frame structure was expected to last about ten years, to be replaced by a permanent brick structure. However, this work was never undertaken, and the additional land was sold for housing in the 1970s. For a long time the timber frame structure was known as 'Stechford Baptist Hall' , or Stechford church hall a reflection of the expectation of a permanent structure.

== Organisation ==
In common with other British Baptist churches, Stechford Baptist is congregational in structure, with the Church Meeting of adult members electing the officers of the church at the Annual General Meeting. The calling of a pastor is also in the hands of the Church Meeting, although for more than half of its history the church has been lay-led. The church belongs to the Baptist Union of Great Britain, although there is no authority link between the union and the church, reflecting the position that the Baptist Union is an association with administrative functions rather than a denomination.

== Location ==
The building is situated in Victoria Road, Stechford, inside the Albert Road – Lyttelton Road – Victoria Road triangle originally established by a building programme which accompanied the construction of the railway station in 1843. All of the existing church buildings within Stechford are within this triangle: Stechford Methodist (closed for services from 2005) is on Lyttelton Road, All Saints is on Albert Road, and Corpus Christi straddles Albert and Lyttelton Roads.
