= List of shipwrecks in January 1875 =

The list of shipwrecks in January 1875 includes ships sunk, foundered, grounded, or otherwise lost during January 1875.

== 1 January ==
List of shipwrecks: 1 January 1875
Ship	State	Description
Antonio	United Kingdom	The steamship was driven ashore at Blackpill, Glamorgan. She was on a voyage from Bristol, Gloucestershire to Swansea, Glamorgan.
Carmella	Austria-Hungary	The ship ran aground on the Grado Sandbank, in the Adriatic Sea. She was on a voyage from New York, United States to Trieste.
Edwin	United Kingdom	The ship sprang a leak and was abandoned 45 nautical miles (83 km) east of Gibraltar. Some of her crew were rescued by the steamship Wallachia (United Kingdom) was on a voyage from Oran, Algeria to Glasgow, Renfrewshire.
Emma	Canada	The schooner was abandoned in the Atlantic Ocean before 19 January.
Hannah Hodgson	United Kingdom	The barque was wrecked at Riva, Ottoman Empire. Her crew were rescued by rocket apparatus. She was on a voyage from Feodosia, Russia to Rotterdam, South Holland, Netherlands.
Louisa	United Kingdom	The ship was driven ashore at St. Mawes, Cornwall. She was on a voyage from Moulmein, Burma to Falmouth, Cornwall.
Surprize	United Kingdom	The pilot cutter foundered in the Bristol Channel off Ilfracombe, Devon. Two crew were rescued by the schooner Britannia (Sweden).
Tunstall	United Kingdom	The steamship struck a sunken rock and sank off Sunderland, County Durham. Her crew were rescued. She was on a voyage from London to Sunderland.
William	United Kingdom	The ship was wrecked on a reef off Groomsport, County Down. Her crew were rescued. She was on a voyage from Belfast, County Antrim to Cardiff, Glamorgan.

== 2 January ==
List of shipwrecks: 2 January 1875
Ship	State	Description
Be Good to Me	United Kingdom	The fishing smack was driven ashore and severely damaged at Campbeltown, Argyllshire.
Britannia	Sweden	The schooner ran aground at Port Eynon, Glamorgan, United Kingdom. All on board survived. She was on a voyage from Havre de Grâce, Seine-Inférieure, France to Cardiff, Glamorgan.
Curlew	United Kingdom	The fishing smack was driven ashore and wrecked at Campbeltown.
Eclair	United Kingdom	The steamship ran aground on the Shipwash Sand, in the North Sea off the coast of Suffolk. Her crew were rescued by the smack Mystle (United Kingdom). Eclair was on a voyage from South Shields, County Durham to London. She subsequently broke in two and was a total loss.
Genesse	United Kingdom	The barque foundered off Bonmahon, County Waterford with the loss of three of her twelve crew.
Gertrude	United Kingdom	The ship departed from Saint John's, Newfoundland Colony for Málaga, Spain. No further trace, presumed foundered with the loss of all hands.
Helvetia	Flag unknown	The schooner foundered off Ouessant, Finistère, France.
Johr	United Kingdom	The sloop was driven ashore in Loch Ryan. Her crew were rescued by the Coastguard. She was on a voyage from Belfast, County Antrim to Girvan, Ayrshire.
Keystone	United States	The barque was abandoned in the Atlantic Ocean. Her crew were rescued by Enoch Train (United Kingdom). Keystone was on a voyage from New York to Belfast.
Mary Tatham	United Kingdom	The schooner was wrecked on a sandbank off the coast of Lancashire. Her four crew were rescued by the Lytham Lifeboat. She was on a voyage from Beaumaris, Anglesey to Preston, Lancashire.
Minerva	United Kingdom	The schooner was driven ashore at Rhue, Argyllshire with the loss of one of her three crew. She was on a voyage from Connah's Quay, Flintshire to Belfast.
Perica	United Kingdom	The barque ran aground and was wrecked on Sanda Island, Argyllshire with the loss of five of the fifteen people on board.
San Marcos	United States	The steamship was driven ashore at False Cape, Virginia. She was on a voyage from Galveston, Texas to New York and Liverpool, Lancashire, United Kingdom. She had been refloated by 7 January and was subsequently taken in to Norfolk, Virginia.
Seaward	United Kingdom	The ship was driven ashore in Lough Swilly. She was on a voyage from Runcorn, Cheshire to Ballina, County Mayo. She was refloated on 4 January and taken in to Rathmullan, County Donegal.
Solide	Netherlands	The schooner was driven ashore and severely damaged in Luce Bay. All ten people on board survived. She was on a voyage from Glasgow, Renfrewshire, United Kingdom to Saint Thomas, Virgin Islands.
Vooruit	Netherlands	The ship was driven ashore at Crosby, Lancashire. She was on a voyage from Savannah, Georgia, United States to Liverpool. She was refloated the next day with the assistance of a tug.
Unnamed	United Kingdom	The Mersey Flat ran aground on the West Hoyle Bank, in Liverpool Bay. She was refloated the next day and taken in to Hoylake, Cheshire.

== 3 January ==
List of shipwrecks: 3 January 1875
Ship	State	Description
Baron Skene	United Kingdom	The schooner foundered in the North Sea off Peterhead, Aberdeenshire with the loss of all hands, four or five lives.
Fitzjames	United Kingdom	The steamship was driven ashore at Adra, Spain.
Sphinx	United Kingdom	The barque collided with the steamship Menzaleh (United Kingdom) and sank. Her crew were rescued. Sphinx was on a voyage from Livorno, Italy to Newcastle upon Tyne, Northumberland.
Union Bayonnaise	France	The steamship was wrecked between Capbreton and Ondres, Landes with the loss of a crew member. She was reported to be on a voyage from Antwerp, Belgium to Hartlepool, County Durham, United Kingdom and Boulogne, Pas-de-Calais.
Uriel	Germany	The ship was driven ashore near Wimereux, Pas-de-Calais, France. She was on a voyage from Savannah, Georgia, United States to Reval, Russia.
William Poolman	Netherlands	The ship was driven ashore. She was on a voyage from Samarang, Netherlands East Indies to Vlissingen, Zeeland. She was refloated and towed in to The Downs in a leaky condition by the steamship Van der Thaelen (Belgium). Subsequently towed to Vlissingen by two tugs.

== 4 January ==
List of shipwrecks: 4 January 1875
Ship	State	Description
Clutha	United Kingdom	The steamship was driven ashore at the Mumbles, Glamorgan. She was on a voyage from Swansea, Glamorgan to Glasgow, Renfrewshire.
Emmy	United Kingdom	The schooner was driven ashore at Tramore, County Waterford. Her crew were rescued.
Fanny	United Kingdom	The schooner was driven ashore and broke her back in Tramore Bay. She was abandoned by her seven crew, who were rescued by the Tramore Lifeboat Tom Egan ( Royal National Lifeboat Institution). Fanny was on a voyage from Cardiff, Glamorgan to Barbados.
Filomena	Austria-Hungary	The brig ran aground at the mouth of the River Lune. She was on a voyage from New York, United States to Glasson Dock, Lancashire, United Kingdom. She was refloated and taken in to Glasson Dock.
Gwenissa	United Kingdom	The ship was wrecked north of the Tuskar Rock. She was on a voyage from Iquique, Chile to Glasgow, Renfrewshire. Also reported as wrecked at Waterford.
Hegan	United Kingdom	The brig was driven ashore and wrecked at Ballymacaw, County Waterford with the loss of a crew member.
Johannes and Emilie	Germany	The barque was wrecked at Cape Palmas, Liberia.
Kideren	Norway	The brig foundered in the North Sea. Her crew were rescued. She was on a voyage from Newcastle upon Tyne, Northumberland, United Kingdom to Christiania.
Monrovia	United Kingdom	The steamship was driven ashore at Lagos, Lagos Colony with the loss of two of her crew. She was refloated on 8 February.
Pioneer	United Kingdom	The steamship ran aground in the River Laggan. She was on a voyage from Rotterdam, South Holland, Netherlands to Belfast, County Antrim.
Rossignol	Flag unknown	The ship caught fire at Penarth, Glamorgan.
Tern	United Kingdom	The steamship was driven ashore. She was refloated and taken in to Liverpool, Lancashire for repairs.
Zeus	Greece	The brig was wrecked near Waterford, with the loss of a crew member. She was on a voyage from Porto, Portugal to Ardrossan, Ayrshire, United Kingdom.

== 5 January ==
List of shipwrecks: 5 January 1875
Ship	State	Description
Assora	Norway	The ship was driven ashore and wrecked at Lista with the loss of three of her crew. She was on a voyage from Ghent, East Flanders, Belgium to Christiania.
Canova	Norway	The schooner was towed in to Gijón, Spain in a waterlogged condition by the steamship Aviles (France).
Emily Jane, or Jane Emily	United Kingdom	The brig foundered in the Atlantic Ocean (38°05′N 38°25′W). Her nine crew were rescued by a Norwegian barque. She was on a voyage from the Pacific Ocean to Southampton, Hampshire.

== 6 January ==
List of shipwrecks: 6 January 1875
Ship	State	Description
Agnes	United Kingdom	The fishing boat was sunk by ice at Aberdeen. Her four crew were rescued.
Ariel	United Kingdom	The tug collided with the steamship Lord Raglan (United Kingdom) and sank in the North Sea off the coast of Yorkshire. Her crew survived.
Cheshire	United Kingdom	The ferry, a paddle steamer, collided with the steam flat Merchant (United Kingdom) and sank in the River Mersey. Her 200 passengers were rescued by the tug Flying Childers (United Kingdom). Cheshire was refloated on 9 January. Subsequently rebuilt to include extra watertight compartments and returned to service.
Dorchester	United Kingdom	The ship was abandoned in the Atlantic Ocean. Her crew were rescued. She was on a voyage from New York, United States to Gibraltar.
Grey Eagle	United States	The ship collided with another vessel and capsized at Baltimore, Maryland. She was on a voyage from Baltimore to Rio de Janeiro, Brazil. She was refloated on 23 January.
Hilda	United Kingdom	The ship was wrecked at Chéticamp, Nova Scotia, Canada with the loss of all hands. She was on a voyage from Cascumpec, Prince Edward Island, Canada to an English port.
Hugh Streatfield, and Rajah	United Kingdom	The steamship collided with the steamship Hugh Streatfield and sank in the North Sea off Great Yarmouth, Norfolk. All on board were rescued by Hugh Streatfield, which put in to Great Yarmouth sinking at the bow. Hugh Streatfield was on a voyage from Sunderland, County Durham to Southampton, Hampshire.
Lilly	United Kingdom	The steamship was driven ashore in the River Avon under the Clifton Suspension Bridge. She was on a voyage from Bristol, Gloucestershire to Cardiff, Glamorgan. She was refloated and resumed her voyage but then collided with the steamship Cornwall (United Kingdom).
Lord Strathnairn	United Kingdom	The ship ran aground on the Goodwin Sands, Kent. She was refloated on 9 January and was towed in to The Downs.
Pacific	United Kingdom	The steamship was driven ashore at "Salfningen", Belgium. She was on a voyage from Harwich, Essex to Antwerp, Belgium.
Sappho	United Kingdom	The steamship was driven ashore at "Salfningen". She was on a voyage from Bristol to Antwerp.

== 7 January ==
List of shipwrecks: 7 January 1875
Ship	State	Description
Angelo Padre	Argentina	The ship was driven ashore on Terschelling, Friesland, Netherlands. She was on a voyage from Buenos Aires to Altona, Germany. She was refloated on 11 January and towed in to Harlingen, Friesland.
Lion	United Kingdom	The steamship was driven ashore at Hoek van Holland, South Holland, Netherlands. She was on a voyage from Rotterdam, South Holland to London. She was refloated.

== 8 January ==
List of shipwrecks: 8 January 1875
Ship	State	Description
Felton Bent	United Kingdom	The ship was driven ashore at Check Point, County Waterford. She was on a voyage from Liverpool, Lancashire to Havana, Cuba. She was later refloated and taken in to Waterford in a leaky condition.
Louise Angèle	United Kingdom	The schooner was wrecked in the Small Isles, Argyllshire. Her crew were rescued.
Robert Young	United Kingdom	The fishing boat struck the pier at Penzance, Cornwall and was driven ashore with the loss of two of her six crew.
Santa Marina	Greece	The schooner was run down and sunk by the steamship Thomas Wilson (United Kingdom) at Messina, Sicily, Italy.

== 9 January ==
List of shipwrecks: 9 January 1875
Ship	State	Description
Ann Elizabeth	United Kingdom	The brigantine collided with the steamship Dudley (United Kingdom) and foundered in the North Sea 9 nautical miles (17 km) off the Dudgeon Lightship ( Trinity House) with the loss of four of her seven crew. Survivors were rescued by Dudley. Elizabeth was on a voyage from Sunderland, County Durham to Portsmouth, Hampshire.
Montezuma	France	The steamship was wrecked off Inagua, Bahamas. She was on a voyage from Haiti to Havre de Grâce, Seine-Inférieure.
Saltee	United Kingdom	The barque was driven ashore at Check Point, County Waterford. She was on a voyage from Sulina, Ottoman Empire to Waterford.
Zorilla	United Kingdom	The steamship ran aground on the Glasgorman Bank, in the Irish Sea off the coast of County Dublin, United Kingdom and broke in two. All 37 people on reached shore in the boats. She was on a voyage from on a voyage from Liverpool, Lancashire to Palermo, Sicily, Italy.
No. 36	United Kingdom	The pilot boat foundered in the Bristol Channel off the coast of Devon. Her crew were rescued by an Italian barque.
Unnamed	United Kingdom	The steamship was driven ashore at the Old Head of Kinsale. She was refloated with the assistance of another steamship.

== 10 January ==
List of shipwrecks: 10 January 1875
Ship	State	Description
Akbar	United States	The ship ran aground on the Paramatta Reef. She was on a voyage from Cardiff, Glamorgan, United Kingdom to Singapore, Straits Settlements. She was refloated and put in to Batavia, Netherlands East Indies in a leaky condition.
Columba	United Kingdom	The steamship ran ashore at Palermo, Sicily, Italy. She was refloated.
Hans Christen Orsen	Norway	The ship departed from the River Tyne for Messina, Sicily. No further trace, presumed foundered with the loss of all hands.
Heyd, and Louise Laura	Germany	The tug Heyd and the ship Louise Laura, which she was towing, were driven ashore at Memel. Louise Laura was on a voyage from Grangemouth, Stirlingshire, United Kingdom to Memel. Her crew were rescued.
Live Oak	United Kingdom	The ship was driven ashore near Feodosiya, Russia. Her crew were rescued. She was later refloated and towed in to Kertch, where she arrived on 6 March.

== 11 January ==
List of shipwrecks: 11 January 1875
Ship	State	Description
Aurora	United Kingdom	The barque capsized in the Atlantic Ocean with the loss of three of her sixteen crew. The barque Nanta Italy rescued eight survivors on 15 January, two others being drowned and three refusing to leave the ship, presumed subsequently lost. Aurora was on a voyage from Doboy, Georgia, United States to Poole, Dorset.
Felicia	Italy	The schooner was driven ashore 6 nautical miles (11 km) west of the mouth of the Llobregat and was a total loss. She was on a voyage from Nice, Alpes-Maritimes, France to Gibraltar.
Marigo	Greece	The brig was driven ashore at Sangatte, Pas-de-Calais, France. She was on a voyage from Phillippeville, Algeria to Dunkirk, Nord, France.
Woodburn	United Kingdom	The steamship ran aground off Jeddah, Hejaz Vilayet. She was on a voyage from Bombay, India to Liverpool, Lancashire. She was refloated on 14 January.

== 12 January ==
List of shipwrecks: 12 January 1875
Ship	State	Description
Britannia	United Kingdom	The barque was driven ashore and severely damaged near Port Logan, Wigtownshire. Her crew were rescued. She was on a voyage from Mauritius to Greenock, Renfrewshire. The Port Logan Lifeboat subsequently had to rescue fourteen salvors from the wreck.
Carl August	Germany	The barque was driven ashore on Skagen, Denmark. She was on a voyage from Savannah, Georgia, United States to Reval, Russia. She was refloated and taken in to Fredrikshavn, Denmark.
Clansman	United Kingdom	The schooner was driven ashore at Ballyquinton, County Down. She was on a voyage from Glasgow, Renfrewshire to St. Jago de Cuba, Cuba. She was refloated and taken in to Belfast, County Antrim in a sinking condition.
HMS Curlew	Royal Navy	The Plover-class gunvessel was damaged by fire at Shanghai, China.
Dorothy	United Kingdom	The ship ran aground at South Shields, County Durham. She was on a voyage from Huelva, Spain to South Shields. She was refloated with the assistance of a tug.
Helene	Germany	The brig collided with the barque Amphion (Norway) and sank. Her crew were rescued. Helene was on a voyage from Bo'ness, Lothian, United Kingdom to Rostock.
Tantivy	United Kingdom	The schooner was driven ashore in the Sound of Sanda on the coast of the Mull of Kintyre, Argyllshire. Her crew were rescued She was on a voyage from Falmouth, Cornwall to Glasgow, Renfrewshire. She subsequently became a wreck.

== 13 January ==
List of shipwrecks: 13 January 1875
Ship	State	Description
Anne Kimball	United Kingdom	The ship abandoned in the Atlantic Ocean 120 nautical miles (220 km) south west of Madeira. Her fifteen crew were rescued by the barque Baltic (Norway). Anne Kimball was on a voyage from Antwerp, Belgium to Philadelphia, Pennsylvania. The derelict was discovered by the steamship Ambrose (United Kingdom). She was taken in to Saint Vincent.
Bessemer	United Kingdom	The steamship ran aground in the River Tees at Billingham, County Durham. She was on a voyage from Grangemouth, Stirlingshire to Stockton-on-Tees, County Durham.
Ennismore	United Kingdom	The steamship was driven ashore in Ashton Bay. She was on a voyage from Dublin to Glasgow, Renfrewshire. She was refloated and resumed her voyage.
Pladda	United Kingdom	The steamship ran ashore at South Shields, County Durham. Her 60 passengers were taken off by the paddle tug Great Britain (United Kingdom) or by boats. Pladda was on a voyage from Dundee, Forfarshire to Newcastle upon Tyne, Northumberland. She was refloated and taken in to South Shields.
William Storrett	Canada	The schooner foundered off Porto, Portugal. Her crew were rescued. She was on a voyage from New York, United States to Porto.

== 14 January ==
List of shipwrecks: 14 January 1875
Ship	State	Description
Active	United Kingdom	The ship was driven ashore at Bideford, Devon.
Ann Taylor	United Kingdom	The brig ran aground on the Corton Sand, in the North Sea off the coast of Suffolk. She was on a voyage from London to Granton, Lothian. She was refloated and assisted in to Great Yarmouth, Norfolk.
Barbara	United Kingdom	The barque was abandoned in the Atlantic Ocean. Her crew were rescued by Sydney (Sweden). Barbara was on a voyage from the Cameroon River to Bristol, Gloucestershire.
Bootle	United Kingdom	The ship was crush between a steamship and an ironclad at Buenos Aires, Argentina and was severely damaged. She was beached in a sinking condition.
Deborah	United Kingdom	The schooner ran aground on the West Rocks, in the North Sea off Harwich, Essex She was refloated with the assistance of two smacks and assisted in to Harwich in a leaky condition. She was on a voyage from London to Ipswich, Suffolk.
Georgia	Canada	The steamship was wrecked in a heavy snowstorm without loss of life on the Northern Triangles, a reef in Penobscot Bay off the coast of Maine United States (43°55′39″N 069°01′40″W).
J. C. A.	United Kingdom	The ship departed from Haverfordwest, Pembrokeshire for Havre de Grâce, Seine-Inférieure, France. No further trace, presumed foundered with the loss of all hands.
Jupiter	Netherlands	The steamship ran aground near Maassluis, South Holland. She was on a voyage from Liepāja, Russia to Rotterdam. She was refloated with the assistance of a tug and a lighter.
Memphis	United Kingdom	The steamship ran aground on the Newcombe Sand, in the North Sea off the coast of Suffolk. She was refloated with the assistance of a tug and assisted in to Great Yarmouth.
Said	United Kingdom	The steamship was severely damaged by fire at Sunderland, County Durham.
Xiphido	Canada	The ship was wrecked at Ingonish, Nova Scotia. She was on a voyage from Sydney, Nova Scotia to the Newfoundland Colony.

== 15 January ==
List of shipwrecks: 15 January 1875
Ship	State	Description
Blanche Marguerite	France	The barque was driven ashore at Brook, Isle of Wight, United Kingdom. Her ten crew were rescued by the Brooke Lifeboat. She broke up on 5 April.
Briton	(Dominion of Newfoundland) Newfoundland Colony	The schooner was abandoned in the Atlantic Ocean. Her crew were rescued by the steamship Idaho (United Kingdom). Briton was on a voyage from Fortune Bay to Halifax, Nova Scotia, Canada.
City of London	United Kingdom	The ship was driven ashore in Tacumshane Bay. She was on a voyage from San Francisco, California, United States to Liverpool, Lancashire.
Eagle	United Kingdom	The ship struck rocks off "Roches Point". She was on a voyage from "Macabi" to Queenstown, County Cork. She put in to Queenstown in a sinking condition and was beached.
Eskdale	United Kingdom	The steamship ran aground 12 nautical miles (22 km) south of "Raz Zurib", Egypt.
Fortuna	Norway	The barque ran aground and sank at "Bukken", Norway. She was on a voyage from Cádiz, Spain to Bergen.
John and Mary	United Kingdom	The Mersey Flat ran aground in the River Dee at Hoylake, Cheshire with the loss of her captain. The other crew member was rescued the next day by the keeper of the Hilbre Island Lighthouse.
Mary Jane	United Kingdom	The ship ran aground on the Briggs, in the Belfast Lough. She was on a voyage from Whitehead, County Antrim to Chester, Cheshire. She was refloated.
'Unnamed	France	The lugger was run down and sunk by the steamship Leopard (United Kingdom) with the loss of a crew member. Survivors were rescued by Leopard.

== 16 January ==
List of shipwrecks: 16 January 1875
Ship	State	Description
Advance	United Kingdom	The ship was damaged by fire at Liverpool, Lancashire.
Amity	United Kingdom	The brig was driven ashore and wrecked on Islay.
Boadicea, and Germania	United Kingdom; Germany	The steamship Boadicea collided with the steamship Germania and sank in the Humber. Boadicea was on a voyage from Alexandria, Egypt to Hull, Yorkshire. She was refloated on 18 January and taken in to Hull. Germania was on a voyage from Hull to Hamburg. She was severely damaged and put back to Hull for repairs.
Cortes	United Kingdom	The steamship foundered in the Bay of Biscay with the loss of 25 of her 29 crew. Survivors were rescued by the barque Osceo ( Canada). Cortes was on a voyage from Cardiff, Glamorgan to Aden.
Eliza	United States	The ship was driven ashore. She was on a voyage from New York to Cette, Hérault, France. Eliza was refloated and taken in to New London, Connecticut in a severely leaky condition. She was placed under repair.
Hawk	United Kingdom	The steamship ran aground off Vlieland, Friesland, Netherlands. She was on a voyage from Hull to Harlingen, Friesland. She subsequently became a wreck.

== 17 January ==
List of shipwrecks: 17 January 1875
Ship	State	Description
Brodjaja	Russia	The brig was driven ashore and wrecked at Thisted, Denmark. Her crew were rescued. She was on a voyage from Grimsby, Lincolnshire, United Kingdom to Liepāja.
Colombia	Germany	The schooner was wrecked on the Jadder Sandbank, in the North Sea off the German coast. Her crew were rescued. She was on a voyage from Alloa, Clackmannanshire, United Kingdom to Stralsund
Conquest	United Kingdom	The tug sank at South Shields, County Durham.
Krone	Germany	The barque ran aground at Höganäs, Sweden. She was on a voyage from Grangemouth, Stirlingshire, United Kingdom to Copenhagen, Denmark. She was refloated with assistance from the steamship Svitzer (Denmark) and taken in to Copenhagen.
Success	Germany	The ship was driven ashore near Leba. Her crew were rescued. She was on a voyage from Philadelphia, Pennsylvania, United States to Danzig.

== 18 January ==
List of shipwrecks: 18 January 1875
Ship	State	Description
Insulado	Portugal	The steamship collided with City of Mecca (United Kingdom) and sank off the mouth of the Tagus. Her crew were rescued by the steamship Anglia (United Kingdom) and City of Mecca. Insulado was on a voyage from Lisbon to Madeira.
Jorawur	United Kingdom	The barque was abandoned in the Atlantic Ocean (47°46′N 8°30′W). Her crew were rescued by Epsilon (United Kingdom). Jorawur was on a voyage from London to Calcutta, India. She was towed in to Plymouth, Devon on 27 January by Agenoria (United Kingdom)
Sabra	United States	The barque was driven ashore at the Currituck Beach Lighthouse, North Carolina. Her crew survived. She was on a voyage from Harbourville, Nova Scotia, Canada to Baltimore, Maryland.

== 19 January ==
List of shipwrecks: 19 January 1875
Ship	State	Description
Aeron Belle	United Kingdom	The schooner was driven ashore in Dublin Bay. Her crew were rescued by the Kingstown Lifeboat. She was on a voyage from Glendore, County Cork to Greenock, Renfrewshire.
Andjelike, or Andrelic	Trieste	The ship was wrecked at Cornel Mawr Point, Carmarthenshire, United Kingdom with the loss of all hands. She was on a voyage from Bordeaux, Gironde to Cardiff, Glamorgan, United Kingdom.
Anne Elizabeth, Secret, and Unnamed vessel	United Kingdom	Secret collided with a schooner and then Anne Elizabeth and ran aground on the Holywood Bank, in the Belfast Lough. Anne Elizabeth sank. Four of her eight crew reached shore in a boat, the other four were rescued by the Coastguard
Antelope	Germany	The brig was driven onto the Brake Sand and sank. Her crew were rescued by the lugger Seamans Hope (United Kingdom). Antelope was on a voyage from London, United Kingdom to Cette, Hérault, France.
Duncan	United Kingdom	The steamship was driven ashore at Montrose, Forfarshire. She was refloated.
Hawk	United Kingdom	The steamship ran aground and sank off Texel, North Holland, Netherlands.
Shamrock	United Kingdom	The brigantine ran aground on Scroby Sands, Norfolk and was wrecked. Her crew were rescued. She was on a voyage from Newcastle upon Tyne, Northumberland to Great Yarmouth, Norfolk.
Vittorioso	Italy	The brig was driven ashore and wrecked at Bannow Bay, near Fethard-on-Sea, County Wexford, United Kingdom, on a voyage from Cardiff to Constantinople, Ottoman Empire. Her nine crew were rescued by the Duncannon Lifeboat.
Unnamed	Flag unknown	The schooner ran aground on the North Bull, in the Irish Sea off the coast of County Dublin, United Kingdom. Her crew were rescued by the Kingstown Lifeboat.

== 20 January ==
List of shipwrecks: 20 January 1875
Ship	State	Description
Albert Wells	United Kingdom	The ship was damaged in a storm at South Shields, County Durham.
Brotherly Love	United Kingdom	The brig was severely damaged in a storm at South Shields.
Clifton	United Kingdom	The ship was driven ashore on Piel Island, Lancashire. She was on a voyage from Galveston, Texas, United States to Fleetwood, Lancashire.
Euxine	United Kingdom	The steamship was severely damaged in a storm at South Shields.
Florist	United Kingdom	The brigantine was severely damaged in a storm at South Shields with the loss of two of her crew.
Fusilier	United Kingdom	The steamship was damaged in a storm at South Shields.
George Clark	United Kingdom	The brig was severely damaged in a storm at South Shields.
Giuseppe Proto	Italy	The barque was abandoned at sea. Her crew were rescued by Maria Stoneman ( Canada).
Haba	United Kingdom	The schooner was driven ashore in Loch Ryan. Her crew were rescued. She was on a voyage from Ayr to Belfast, County Antrim.
Jessy	(United Kingdom of Great Britain and Ireland) Guernsey	The barque ran aground, capsized and was severely damaged in a storm at South Shields.
Kepler	United Kingdom	The steamship was severely damaged in a storm at South Shields.
Lindisfarne	United Kingdom	The steamship was severely damaged in a storm at South Shields.
Livingstone	United Kingdom	The brig was severely damaged in a storm at South Shields.
Mirfield	United Kingdom	The steamship was damaged in a storm at South Shields.
Neluske	Belgium	The steamship was severely damaged in a storm at Jarrow, County Durham.
Oceanwood	United Kingdom	The steamship was driven ashore and severely damaged in a storm at Jarrow.
Orwell	United Kingdom	The schooner was severely damaged in a storm at South Shields.
Pearl	United Kingdom	The ship was damaged in a storm at South Shields.
Phœbe	United Kingdom	The brig was severely damaged in a storm at South Shields.
Polycarp	United Kingdom	The full-rigged ship was damaged in a storm at South Shields.
Quebec Packet	United Kingdom	The ship was severely damaged in a storm at South Shields.
Sagatun, and Sarah	Germany; United Kingdom	The ships collided and both ran aground on the Gelbsand. Sagatun was on a voyage from Skudesneshavn, Norway to Cuxhaven. She was refloated and resumed her voyage. Sarah was refloated and put back to Cuxhaven.
Sirius	Canada	The brig was severely damaged in a storm at South Shields.
Thyra	United States	The barque was abandoned in the Atlantic Ocean. Her crew were rescued by Twee Gezusters (Netherlands. Thyra was on a voyage from Philadelphia, Pennsylvania to Copenhagen, Denmark.
Westoe	United Kingdom	The steamship was damaged in a storm at South Shields.
William Dyer	United Kingdom	The brig was severely damaged in a storm at South Shields.
Young England	United Kingdom	The barque was severely damaged in a storm at South Shields.

== 21 January ==
List of shipwrecks: 21 January 1875
Ship	State	Description
Afghan	United Kingdom	The smack ran aground off Brouwershaven, Zeeland, Netherlands. Her five crew were rescued. She was on a voyage from Dartmouth, Devon to Antwerp, Belgium.
Asia	United Kingdom	The steamship was driven ashore near Saint-Martin-de-Ré, Île-de-Ré, Charente-Inférieure, France.
Edward Stonard	United Kingdom	The ship departed from Holyhead, Anglesey for London. No further trace, presumed foundered with the loss of all hands.
Fenella	United Kingdom	The steamship ran aground on the Herd Sand, in the North Sea off the coast of County Durham. She was refloated and towed in to South Shields.
Springwood	United Kingdom	The ship ran aground on the Pluckington Bank, in Liverpool Bay. She was refloated with assistance from the tug Knight Templar (United Kingdom).

== 22 January ==
List of shipwrecks: 22 January 1875
Ship	State	Description
Acorn	United Kingdom	The ship was holed by an anchor and sank in the Cattewater. She was on a voyage from Poole, Dorset to Porthleven, Cornwall.
Favonius	United Kingdom	The ship departed from Falmouth, Cornwall for Le Conquet, Finistère, France. No further trace, presumed foundered with the loss of all hands.
George Batters	United Kingdom	The steamship departed from Porthcawl, Glamorgan for Gibraltar. No further trace, presumed foundered with the loss of all hands.
Leila	United States	The ship ran aground and was wrecked off Anjer, Netherlands East Indies. She was on a voyage from New York to Batavia, Netherlands East Indies.
Lizzie Bovill	United Kingdom	The barque was driven ashore at Sea Palling, Norfolk and was abandoned by all but her captain. Eight crew were rescued by the Palling Lifeboat. She was on a voyage from London to Newcastle upon Tyne, Northumberland. She was refloated and towed in to Great Yarmouth, Norfolk.
Mediator	United States	Carrying general cargo, the steamship was wrecked at North Point on the Barnegat Shoals, 0.8 nautical miles (1.5 km) off Harvey Cedars, New Jersey. Her wreck sank six hours later. Her entire crew survived.
Nevada	United Kingdom	The steamship ran aground in the Hudson River. She was refloated.

== 23 January ==
List of shipwrecks: 23 January 1875
Ship	State	Description
Betsey	United Kingdom	The schooner sank at Ramsey, Isle of Man. Her crew were rescued. She was on a voyage from Ayr to Douglas, Isle of Man.
Cornwallis	United Kingdom	The ship was wrecked on Pitcairn Island. Her crew survived. They were taken off the island on 26 January by Dauntless (United States). Cornwallis was on a voyage from San Francisco, California, United States to Liverpool, Lancashire.
Fawn	United Kingdom	The lugger was run down and sunk in the Solent by the brig Jeannie (United Kingdom). Her crew were rescued.
Garibaldi	United Kingdom	The sloop ran aground at Lindisfarne, Northumberland.
Halcyon	United Kingdom	The brig was abandoned in the Atlantic Ocean. Her crew were rescued by Frederick Weyer (United States). Halcyon was on a voyage from Cardiff, Glamorgan to Cuba.
Livonia	(United Kingdom of Great Britain and Ireland) Guernsey	The brig collided with the barque Frank Marion (United States) and foundered in the English Channel 5 nautical miles (9.3 km) off Beachy Head, Sussex. Her crew were rescued by Frank Marion. Her captain reached shore in the jolly boat. Livonia was on a voyage from South Shields, County Durham to Jersey, Channel Islands.
Northern City	United Kingdom	The steamship struck rocks 20 nautical miles (37 km) south of Aberdeen. She was on a voyage from Hull, Yorkshire to Aberdeen. She was refloated and resumed her voyage, but consequently foundered off Cove, Aberdeenshire. All 24 people on board took to the lifeboats and survived.
Rashgar	United Kingdom	The steamship was driven ashore. she was on a voyage from Middlesbrough, Yorkshire to Japan. She was refloated and taken in to Gravesend, Kent.
Sofia	Denmark	The barque ran aground and sank off Brouwershaven, Zeeland, Netherlands. She was on a voyage from Aux Cayes, Haiti to Rotterdam, South Holland, Netherlands.
Sophie	Denmark	The schooner was wrecked on Skagen with the loss of all hands.
Wild Wave	United Kingdom	The brigantine was wrecked at Peveril Point, Dorset. Her six crew were rescued by the Coastguard.

== 24 January ==
List of shipwrecks: 24 January 1875
Ship	State	Description
Burgermeister Bernhard	Germany	The ship was wrecked on the Jadder, in the North Sea. Her crew were rescued. She was on a voyage from Hull, Yorkshire, United Kingdom to Danzig.
Ethel	United Kingdom	The brigantine was driven ashore and wrecked in Freshwater Bay, Pembrokeshire with the loss of three of her seven crew. She was on a voyage from Limerick to Cardiff, Glamorgan.
Libertas	Germany	The schooner was driven ashore at Southend, Essex, United Kingdom. She was on a voyage from Leigh-on-Sea, Essex to Stolpemünde. She was refloated, but ran aground on the Maplin Sand. She was refloated and taken in to Southend.
Lochnagar	United Kingdom	The steamship ran aground on the Galloper Sand with the loss of five of her 26 crew. Survivors were rescued by the smack Fifteenth June (Belgium) and the barque Hirondelle (France). Lochnagar was on a voyage from Newcastle upon Tyne, Northumberland to Bombay, India.
Marie Reine	France	The barque was driven ashore and wrecked at Chesil Beach, Dorset, United Kingdom with the loss of four of her fourteen crew. She was on a voyage from Dunkirk, Nord to "Goree".
Queen Victoria	United Kingdom	The ketch was driven ashore at Sunderland, County Durham. Her three crew were rescued by the Sunderland Lifeboat. She was on a voyage from King's Lynn, Norfolk to Sunderland.
Rose of Sharon	United Kingdom	The ship was driven ashore at Dungeness, Kent. She was on a voyage from South Shields, County Durham to Lisbon, Portugal. She was refloated and taken in to The Downs.
Santander	Spain	The steamship ran aground at Bilbao. She was on a voyage from Liverpool, Lancashire, United Kingdom to Bilbao.
Scio	United Kingdom	The steamship foundered off Cape Finisterre, Spain. She was on a voyage from Sulina, Ottoman Empire to Bristol, Gloucestershire.

== 25 January ==
List of shipwrecks: 25 January 1875
Ship	State	Description
John and Samuel	United Kingdom	The smack was driven ashore at West Cowes, Isle of Wight.
Kate	United Kingdom	The schooner was wrecked on Brecqhou, Channel Islands. Her crew were rescued. She was on a voyage from Truro, Cornwall to Havre de Grâce, Seine-Inférieure.
Ontario	United Kingdom	The ship caught fire at "Burneo". She was on a voyage from Newcastle upon Tyne, Northumberland to Bombay, India.
Quattro Sorelle	Italy	The barque ran aground on the Englishman's Shoal, in the Dardanelles. She was refloated and taken in to Constantinople, Ottoman Empire for repairs.
Voltigeur	Germany	The brig was abandoned in the Atlantic Ocean off the Isles of Scilly, United Kingdom. Her crew were rescued. She was on a voyage from Pärnau, Russia to Falmouth, Cornwall, United Kingdom.

== 26 January ==
List of shipwrecks: 26 January 1875
Ship	State	Description
Andreas Sindemaun	Denmark	The schooner ran aground on the Tiland and was wrecked.
Caen	United Kingdom	The steamship was driven ashore at The Lizard, Cornwall. Her eleven crew were rescued. She was on a voyage from Caen, Calvados, France to Cardiff, Glamorgan.
Marie	United States	The barque ran aground at Pensacola, Florida. She was refloated in mid-February.
Queen of the Colonies	United Kingdom	The ship sank at Benquet, Landes. She was on a voyage from Batavia, Netherlands East Indies to Falmouth, Cornwall.
Thule	United Kingdom	The barque ran aground at Pensacola. She was refloated in mid-February.
Vesta	United Kingdom	The ship departed from the Rio Pongas for Liverpool, Lancashire. No further trace, presumed foundered with the loss of all hands.
Voltisene	Germany	The brig was abandoned in a sinking condition. Her crew were rescued by Mandalay (United Kingdom).

== 27 January ==
List of shipwrecks: 27 January 1875
Ship	State	Description
Atlantic	United Kingdom	The ship was driven ashore at Saint-Nazaire, Loire-Inférieure, France. She was on a voyage from Belize City, British Honduras to Saint Nazaire.
Edith	United Kingdom	The ship was beached at Newport, Monmouthshire.
Ellen	United Kingdom	The barque was driven ashore at Milford Haven, Pembrokeshire.
Emma	United Kingdom	The brig ran aground on the Longsand, in the North Sea off the coast of Essex. She was on a voyage from Blyth, Northumberland to Lisbon, Portugal. She was refloated and assisted in to Harwich, Essex.
Glenning	United Kingdom	The schooner was driven ashore and wrecked on the Gower Peninsula, Glamorgan with loss of life.
Hilda	United Kingdom	The barque was driven ashore at Bremerhaven, Germany. She was on a voyage from South Shields, county Durham to Iquique, Peru.
Pike	United Kingdom	The brig was wrecked on Scroby Sands, Norfolk. Her crew were rescued by the Caister Lifeboat. She was on a voyage from South Shields, County Durham to Shoreham-by-Sea, Sussex and/or Yarmouth, Isle of Wight.
Rattler	United Kingdom	The barque was driven ashore and wrecked at Linney Head, Pembrokeshire. Five of her twelve crew were reported missing. She was on a voyage from Old Calabar, Lagos Colony to Liverpool, Lancashire.
Valhalla	Norway	The ship struck a submerged object and sank at Tananger, Denmark. Her crew were rescued. She was on a voyage from Stavanger to Christiania.

== 28 January ==
List of shipwrecks: 28 January 1875
Ship	State	Description
Anonima	United Kingdom	The ship was driven ashore at Pierowall, Westray, Orkney Islands.
Dunmore	United Kingdom	The barque was driven ashore at Pevensey, Sussex. She was on a voyage from London to Nelson, New Zealand. She was refloated.
Redesdale	United Kingdom	The steamship ran aground in the Clyde at Greenock, Renfrewshire. She was on a voyage from Glasgow, Renfrewshire to Constantinople, Ottoman Empire and/or Melbourne, Australia. She was refloated on 1 February and taken in to Greenock.
Scandia	Denmark	The steamship ran aground and sank at Rønne. She was refloated on 13 February and taken in to Rønne.

== 29 January ==
List of shipwrecks: 29 January 1875
Ship	State	Description
Canessa Padre	Flag unknown	The barque ran aground on the Cross Sand, in the North Sea off the coast of Norfolk, United Kingdom. She was on a voyage from Montevideo, Uruguay to Sunderland, County Durham She was later refloated and towed in to Great Yarmouth, Norfolk.
Norden	United Kingdom	The steamship ran aground at Aarhus, Denmark. She was on a voyage from Leith, Lothian to Aarhus .
Pauchitas	Germany	The ship ran aground on the Sud. She was on a voyage from Cuxhaven to Bremen.

== 30 January ==
List of shipwrecks: 30 January 1875
Ship	State	Description
Atlantic	United Kingdom	The ship was driven ashore at "Meisko Lima". She was on a voyage from Hong Kong to Vancouver Island, British Columbia, Canada. She was refloated and put back to Hong Kong.
Christiane	Norway	The ship ran aground at Randesund. She was on a voyage from Bo'ness, Lothian, United Kingdom to Christiania.
Countess of Erne	United Kingdom	The paddle steamer was damaged by fire at Holyhead, Anglesey.
Express	United Kingdom	The steamship was driven ashore at Castlerock, County Londonderry. She was on a voyage from Londonderry to Portrush, County Antrim.
Louisa	United Kingdom	The pilot cutter was run down and sunk off Dungeness, Kent by the steamship Humboldt (Germany) with the loss of three of the six people on board. Survivors were rescued by Humboldt.
Margaret Evans	United Kingdom	The full-rigged ship was driven ashore at Seaford, Sussex. Her 21 were rescued by the Newhaven Lifeboat. She was on a voyage from Philadelphia, Pennsylvania, United States to Antwerp, Belgium. She was refloated on 1 February.
Nellie Moody	United Kingdom	The ship was driven ashore at Moelfre, Anglesey. She was on a voyage from Liverpool, Lancashire to Yarmouth, Nova Scotia, Canada.
Toronto	United Kingdom	The barque was driven onto the Bathhouse Rocks. All eleven people on board were rescued by the Ardrossan Lifeboat. She was on a voyage from Liverpool to Ardrossan, Ayrshire. She was refloated on 4 February and towed in to Greenock, Renfrewshire.

== 31 January ==
List of shipwrecks: 31 January 1875
Ship	State	Description
Anna	Germany	The barque ran aground on the Goodwin Sands, Kent, United Kingdom. Her sixteen crew were rescued by the Broadstairs Lifeboat.
Edith	United Kingdom	The schooner was driven ashore near Courtmacsherry, County Cork. Her crew were rescued.
Hannah	United Kingdom	The schooner was abandoned in the Irish Sea 30 nautical miles (56 km) off Great Orme Head, Caernarfonshire with the loss of all but two of her crew. Survivors were rescued by the Moelfre Lifeboat Lady Vivian. ( Royal National Lifeboat Institution). Hannah was on a voyage from Widnes, Cheshire to Wicklow. She was taken in to Liverpool, Lancashire by the tug Knight Templar (United Kingdom).
Respigadera	Flag unknown	The ship caught fire at San Francisco, California, United States and was scuttled. She was on a voyage from San Francisco to Sunderland, County Durham.
Ressource	Germany	The ship was discovered derelict in the English Channel 60 nautical miles (110 km) south east of The Lizard, Cornwall, United Kingdom by the steamship Chilian (United Kingdom), which towed her in to Falmouth, Cornwall. Ressource was on a voyage from Baltimore, Maryland, United States to London, United Kingdom.

== Unknown date ==
List of shipwrecks: Unknown date in January 1875
Ship	State	Description
Arc en Ciel	United Kingdom	The ship was driven ashore near Yarmouth, Isle of Wight, United Kingdom. She was on a voyage from Havre de Grâce, Seine-Inférieure to Nantes, Loire-Inférieure.
Arrow Belle	United Kingdom	The schooner was wrecked in Dublin Bay. Her four crew were rescued by the Kingstown Lifeboat.
Balmoral	United Kingdom	The steamship was lost before 22 January. Her crew survived. She was on a voyage from Saint-Nazaire, Loire-Infériere to Antwerp, Belgium.
Batavia	Netherlands	The barque was driven ashore on Madura Island, Netherlands East Indies. She was on a voyage from Amsterdam, North Holland to Makassar, Netherlands East Indies. She was refloated and taken in to Surabaya, Netherlands East Indies for repairs.
Ben and Maria	United Kingdom	The ship was driven ashore at Cleethorpes, Lincolnshire. She was later refloated and towed in to Grimsby, Lincolnshire.
Betty	Germany	The ship foundered in the Atlantic Ocean. Her crew were rescued. She was on a voyage from the Rio Grande to Falmouth, Cornwall, United Kingdom.
Black Sea	United Kingdom	The steamship ran aground near Trieste. She was refloated.
C. E. Scammell	United States	The ship ran aground and was wrecked at "Washwood". She was on a voyage from Bahia, Brazil to Baltimore, Maryland.
Clara R.	United Kingdom	The ship ran aground on the Carrick Bank, in the Belfast Lough and sank. She was refloated on 23 January and taken in to Carrickfergus, County Down.
Crusader	United Kingdom	The steamship ran aground near Hellevoetsluis, Zeeland, Netherlands. She was on a voyage from Nicolaieff, Russia to Rotterdam, South Holland, Netherlands. She was refloated with the assistance of a tug and taken in to Rotterdam, where she arrived on 21 January.
David Burnham	United States	The schooner was probably lost in January. Lost with all 12 hands.
Diana	United Kingdom	The ship put in to Copenhagen, Denmark on fire. She was on a voyage from Hartlepool, County Durham to Pillau, Germany.
Georgia	United States	The schooner was abandoned in the Atlantic Ocean. Her crew were rescued by Albyrne (United Kingdom). Georgia was on a voyage from Boston, Massachusetts to Savannah, Georgia.
Gesine	Netherlands	The ship was driven ashore at Egremont, Lancashire, United Kingdom. She was on a voyage from the Nickerie River to Liverpool, Lancashire. She was refloated on 25 January and towed in to Liverpool.
Hyack	United Kingdom	The ship was wrecked at Grand Manan, Nova Scotia, Canada. She was on a voyage from Saint John's, Newfoundland Colony to Queenstown, County Cork.
Hydra	Denmark	The barque was abandoned in the Atlantic Ocean on or before 30 January. She was on a voyage from Philadelphia, Pennsylvania, United States to Copenhagen. She was discovered 200 nautical miles (370 km) west of the Isles of Scilly, United Kingdom by Houng Ho (United Kingdom), which put four crew aboard. They took her in to Falmouth, where she arrived on 3 February.
Jecholia	Denmark	The schooner was driven ashore near Lyngby. Her crew were rescued. She was on a voyage from Burntisland, Fife, United Kingdom to Fredrikshavn.
Johanna Schwann	Germany	The brig collided with the steamship Rudolph Tornerhjem (Sweden) and sank. Her crew were rescued by Rudolph Tornerhjem. Johanna Schwann was on a voyage from Hull, Yorkshire, United Kingdom to Danzig.
John Munroe	United Kingdom	The ship ran aground on Cleary's Bank, in the Irish Sea off the coast of County Cork. She was a total loss.
Joseph Chandler	United States	The fishing schooner sank in a gale on the Grand Banks of Newfoundland with the loss of all twelve crewm.
Kafferland	United Kingdom	The barque ran aground in the San Blas Islands, United States of Colombia. She was on a voyage from Aspinwall, United States of Colombia to Kingston, Jamaica. She was refloated and completed her voyage in a leaky condition.
La Escossa	United Kingdom	The ship was damaged by fire at Paita, Peru before 19 January.
Lord Macaulay	United Kingdom	The barque ran aground on "Gambales". She was on a voyage from Hong Kong to Yloilo, Spanish East Indies. She was refloated and put in to Manila, Spanish East Indies on 16 January. She subsequently put back to Hong Kong for repairs.
Maria di C.	Spain	The ship was driven ashore near Abermenai Point, Anglesey, United Kingdom. She was on a voyage from Wilmington, Delaware, United States to Liverpool. She was refloated on 23 January and taken in to Caernarfon, United Kingdom.
Metusalem	United Kingdom	The barque ran aground off "Haves". She was on a voyage from Cardiff to Constantinople, Ottoman Empire.
Nimrod	United Kingdom	The ship was wrecked off Clare Island, County Mayo. Her 22 crew were rescued byh the HM Coastguard. The ship's cat also survived. Nimrod was on a voyage from Cardiff, Glamorgan to the West Indies. She was towed in to Inishlyre, County Mayo on 1 February.
Pelicano	United States	The ship was wrecked at Neah Bay, Washington. She was on a voyage from Callao, Peru to the Puget Sound.
Pennsylvania	United States	The steamship ran aground on the Bulkhead Bar. She was on a voyage from Liverpool to Philadelphia.
Princeton	United Kingdom	The ship was struck by lightning and damaged by fire in the Pass a Loutre. She was on a voyage from New Orleans, Louisiana, United States to Liverpool.
Reka	Austria-Hungary	The barque was abandoned in the Atlantic Ocean. Her crew were rescued by Trino (Italy). Reka was on a voyage from swansea, Glamorgan, United Kingdom to Alexandria, Egypt.
Rosetta	Norway	The schooner ran aground near Lindesnes.
Saxonia	Germany	The steamship ran aground near Blankenese. She was on a voyage from New York, United States to Hamburg. She was refloated on 11 January and taken in to Hamburg.
S. W. Kelly	United Kingdom	The ship was driven ashore in the Gulf of Suez. She was on a voyage from Cardiff to Aden. She was refloated and resumed her voyage, arriving on 22 January.
Va et Vient	France	The schooner was driven ashore, derelict, at "Bertbaume Bay", France, on a voyage from Nantes, Loire-Atlantique to Landerneau, Finistère. She had broken up by 22 January.
Vanora	Flag unknown	The ship was driven ashore at "Point Dewi". She was on a voyage from Rio de Janeiro, Brazil to Calcutta, India. She had been refloated by 22 January and taken in to Masulipatam, India.
Victoria C.	Italy	The ship was abandoned. Her nine crew were rescued by the Duncannon Lifeboat.
Vigilant	United Kingdom	The ship was wrecked at Sainte-Marie, Martinique. Her crew survived. She was on a voyage from Newcastle upon Tyne, Northumberland to Sainte-Marie.
Vincenzo	Italy	The brig ran aground in the Dardanelles. She was on a voyage from New York to Constantinople.
Warrior	United Kingdom	The tug was driven ashore at Troon, Ayrshire. She was refloated on 12 January but found to be severely leaky and was beached.
