= Hilbre Islands =

Three tidal islands at the mouth of the estuary of the River Dee, England

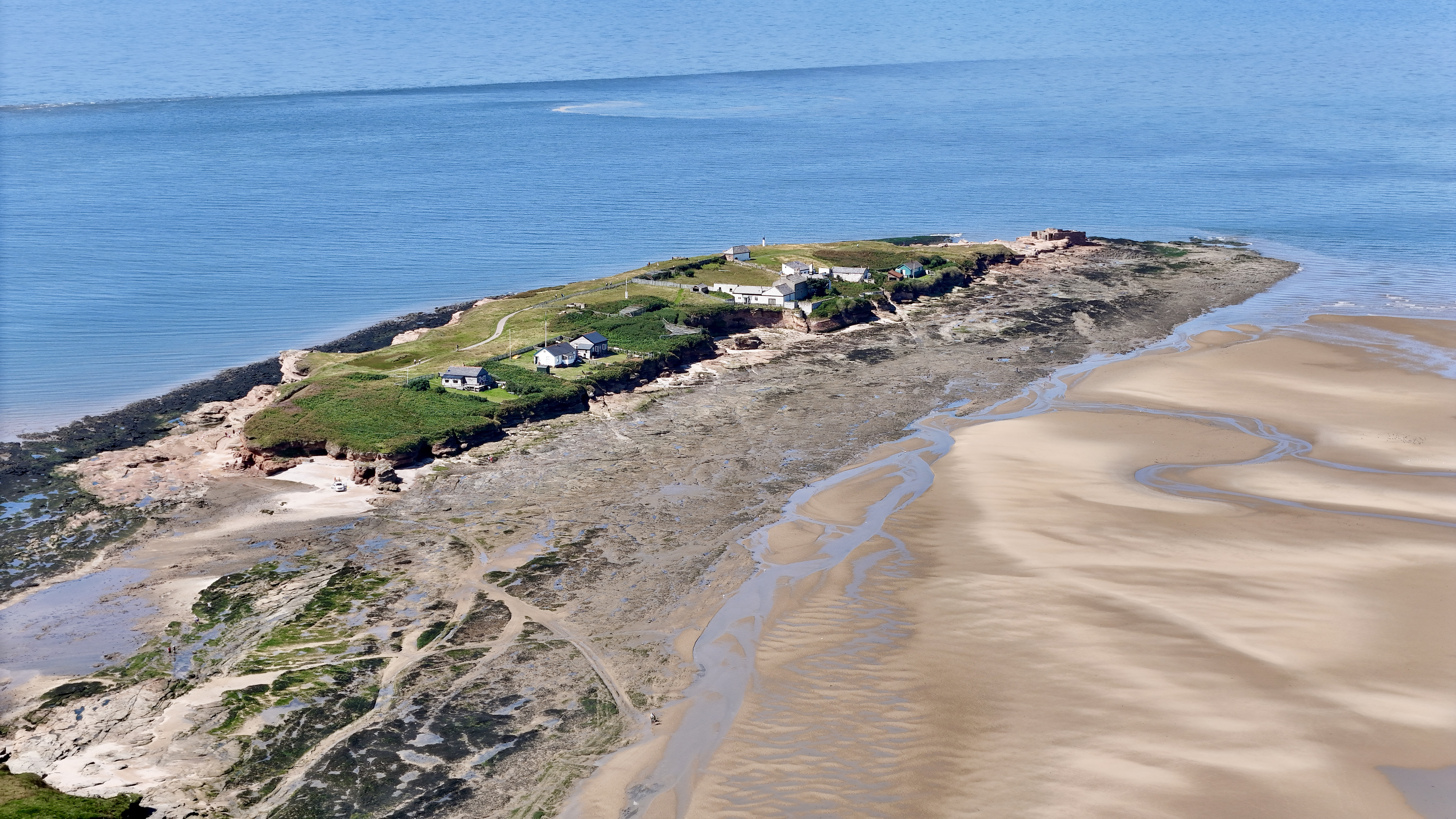
- Aerial view of Hilbre Island
- Interactive map of Hilbre Islands
- Type: Common
- Location: West Kirby, Merseyside
- Coordinates: 53.38°N 3.225°W
- Operator: Metropolitan Borough of Wirral
- Open: All year, dependent on tide
- Status: Open

The Hilbre Islands (/ˈhɪlbriː/ HIL-bree) are three tidal islands in Merseyside, England. They lie off the coast of the Wirral Peninsula at the mouth of the Dee Estuary, opposite Talacre in Flintshire, Wales. The name is thought to derive from a chapel built on the Island and dedicated to St. Hildeburgh.

The islands are a Local Nature Reserve and are within the Dee Estuary Site of Special Scientific Interest. As of 2012, the islands have no permanent residents. They can be reached by foot from West Kirby during low tide.

== Etymology ==
The name Hilbre derives from the dedication of a medieval chapel built on Hilbre Island to St. Hildeburgh, an Anglo-Saxon holy woman, after which it became known as Hildeburgheye or Hildeburgh's island. Hildeburgh is said to have lived on Hilbre Island in the 7th century as an anchorite. Some consider that she never existed, while others equate her with St. Ermenilda, the mother of St. Werburgh to whom Chester Cathedral is dedicated, or St. Edburga of Mercia, daughter of the pagan king Penda. The 19th-century St Hildeburgh's Church, Hoylake, built nearby on the mainland, is named for her.

== History ==
The islands are thought to have been occupied on and off since the Stone Age: several finds of Stone and Bronze Age items and Roman pottery items were discovered in 1926.

Hilbre Island may already have been a hermitage before the Norman invasion or at least a place of pilgrimage based around the lore of St Hildeburgh. In about 1080 a cell and church for Benedictine monks was established on Hilbre Island as a dependency of Chester Cathedral. Although not named directly, it is believed that all three islands were mentioned in the Domesday Book in which mention is made of Chircheb (West Kirby) having two churches: one in the town and one on an island in the sea.

The islands were part of the lands of the Norman lord Robert of Rhuddlan. He gave the islands to the abbey at Saint-Evroul-sur-Ouche in Normandy, who in turn passed responsibility to the Abbey of St. Werburgh in Chester. The islands became a common place for pilgrimage in the 13th and 14th centuries. At the dissolution of the monasteries two monks were allowed to remain on the islands, as they maintained a beacon for shipping in the river mouth. The last monk left the islands in about 1550, as they were no longer considered a sanctuary, having become a centre for commerce and a busy trading port – so much so that a custom house was established to collect taxes on the goods traded. John Leland briefly describes Hilbre Island in his Itineraries (c. 1538–43) and says that "there was a Celle of Monkes of Chestre and a Pilgrimage of Our Lady of Hilbyri", though his contemporary description mentions only "conies" (rabbits) inhabiting the island. William Camden wrote of Hilbre in Britannia (1586), the first chorographical survey of the islands of Great Britain and Ireland, as follows: "In the utmost brinke of this Promontorie lieth a small, hungrie, barren and sandie Isle called Il-bre, which had sometime a little cell of monkes in it."

In 1692 a small factory was set up to refine rock salt. There was also a beer house or inn, which was open when the writer Richard Ayton visited in 1813. With the silting of the River Dee trade switched to ports on the River Mersey and the trade vanished from the islands leading to the closure of the beer house; part of the structure of this building remains incorporated in the custodian's residence.

The islands were bought in 1856 by the Trustees of the Liverpool Docks, which later became known as the Mersey Docks and Harbour Board. Hilbre Island Lighthouse was constructed here in 1927. The islands were sold to Hoylake Council in 1945 for £2,500, passing to Wirral Borough Council on its formation in 1974.

== Location and character ==
Hilbre Island, the largest of the group, is approximately 11.5 acres (47,000 m^{2}; 4.7 ha) in area, and lies about 1 mile (1.6 km) from Red Rocks, the nearest part of the mainland of the Wirral Peninsula. The other two islands are Middle Eye (or in older sources Middle Island and on Ordnance Survey maps Little Hilbre), which is about 3 acres (12,000 m^{2}; 1.2 ha) in size and Little Eye, which is considerably smaller. All three islands are formed of red Bunter sandstone. The main island and Little Hilbre are about 250 yards (230 m) apart, and Little Hilbre is about 1,250 yards (1,140 m) from Little Eye.

== Tourism ==
Hilbre Island is one of 43 (unbridged) tidal islands that can be reached on foot from the mainland of Great Britain. The island can be reached on foot from West Kirby at low tide; this is a popular activity with tourists, especially during the summer months. Little Eye and Middle Eye are both unpopulated, but Hilbre Island has a few houses, some of which are privately owned.

== Facilities ==
The most southerly building on the islands is the Hilbre Bird Observatory, from which birds are continuously monitored in connection with a national network of observatories and ringing stations. In January 2011 it was announced that there would be no permanent ranger. Wirral Council said that they had had difficulty finding a ranger prepared to live without mains electricity or running water on the islands. There are two composting toilets and a rain shelter on the main island.

== Gallery ==
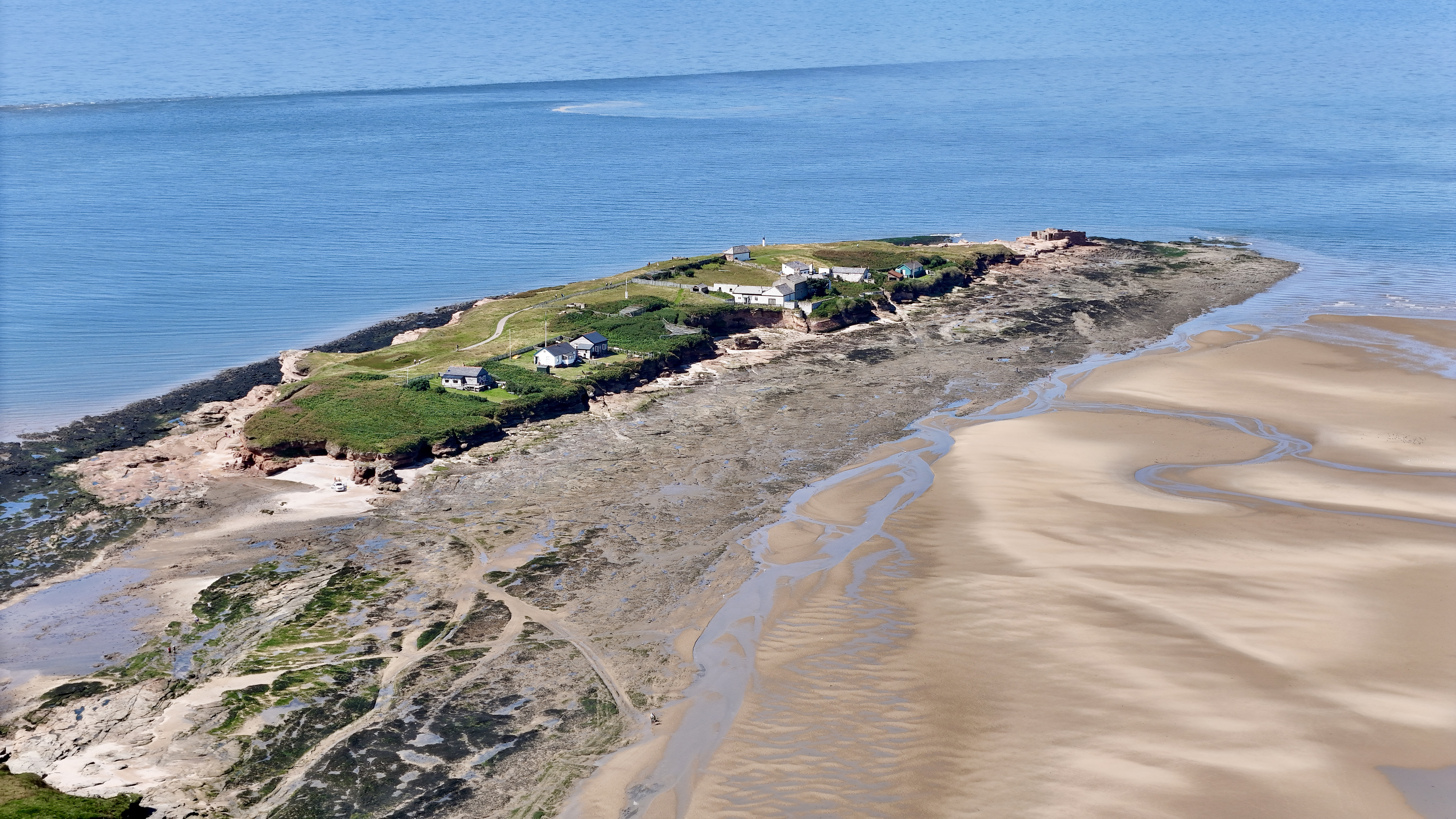
Hilbre Island Aerial View

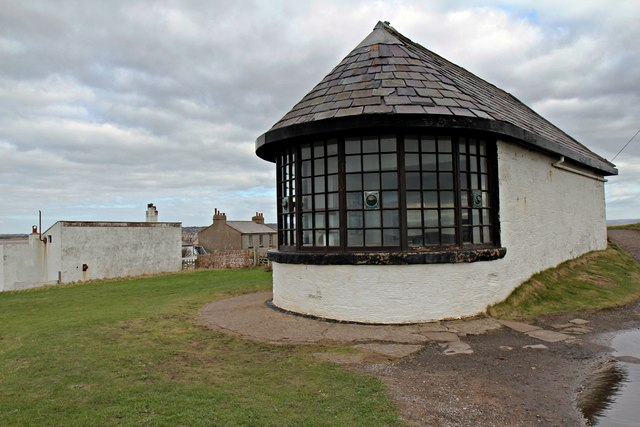
The old telegraph station

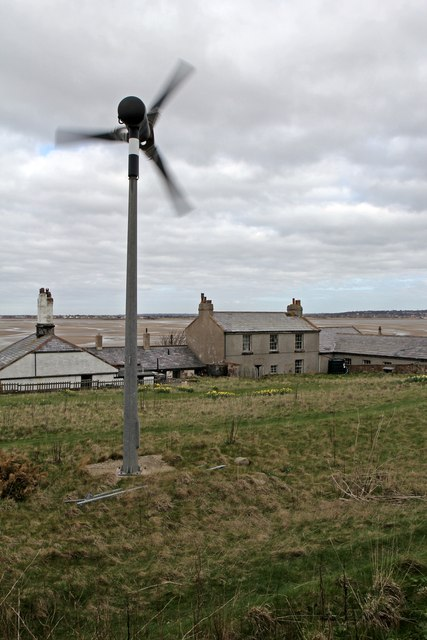
A wind turbine and houses

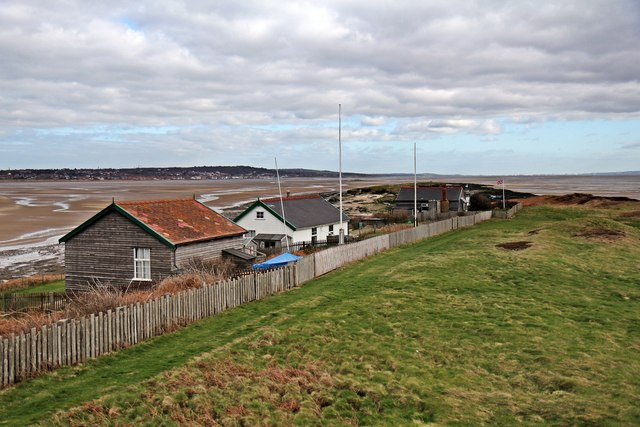
Wooden buildings, looking towards West Kirby

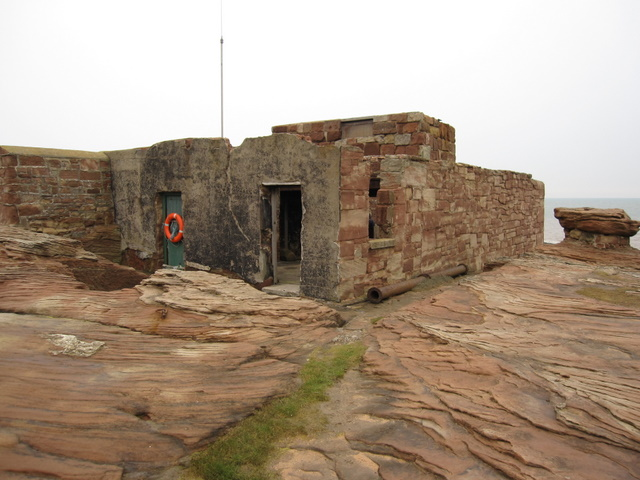
The old lifeboat station

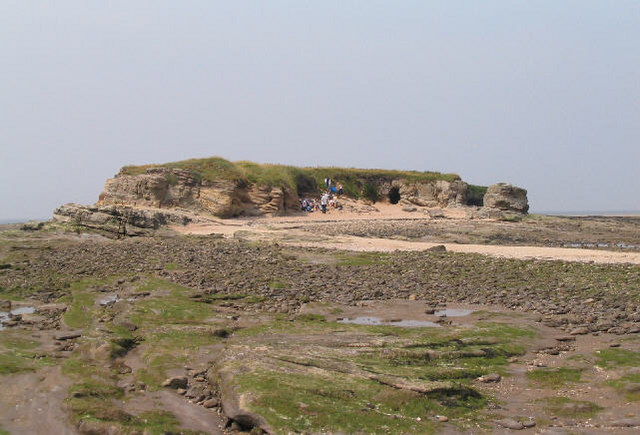
Middle Eye

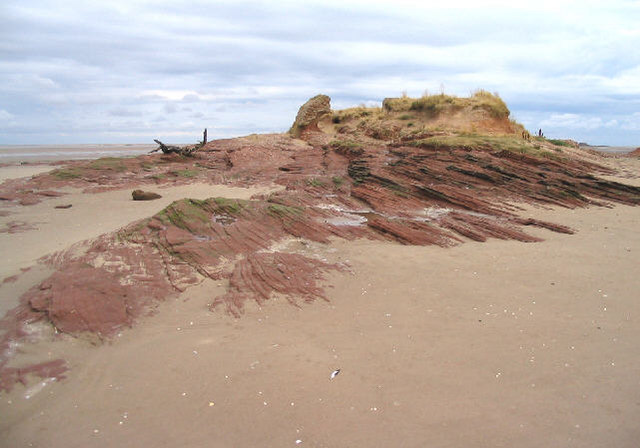
Little Eye

== See also ==
- Listed buildings in Hoylake

== Bibliography ==
- Craggs, J. D. (1978). Hilbre – The Cheshire Island – its history and cultural history. Liverpool University Press. ISBN 0-85323-314-4. (Ed.).
- Burnley, Kenneth J. (1981). Portrait of Wirral. Robert Hale Ltd. ISBN 0-7091-9409-9.
- Mortimer, William Williams (1847). The History of the Hundred of Wirral. London: Whittaker & Co. pp278-279.
