= Birmingham, Stechford =

Birmingham, Stechford, may refer to:

- Stechford, a district of the city of Birmingham, England
- Birmingham Stechford (UK Parliament constituency) (1950–1983)
