= Stechford rail crash =

1967 UK rail crash

Coordinates: 52°29′07″N 1°48′51″W

Details
- Date: 28 February 1967; 15:42
- Location: Stechford, Birmingham
- Country: England
- Line: Rugby–Birmingham–Stafford line
- Cause: Shunting error

Statistics
- Trains: 2
- Passengers: ~40
- Deaths: 9
- Injured: 16

The Stechford rail crash occurred on 28 February 1967 at Stechford railway station in the area of Stechford in Birmingham, England.

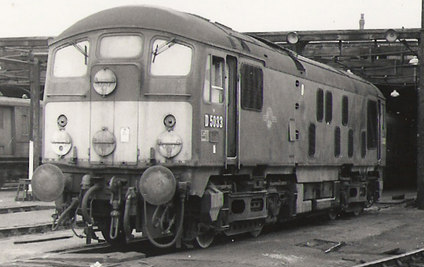
A class 24 locomotive like the one involved in the crash

== Crash ==
A Class 24 diesel locomotive, fleet number D5002, had arrived at Stechford sidings with a ballast train. This was due to return to Nuneaton and so the locomotive needed to be run round the train. There were too many wagons for the runaround loop to be used, so the Head Shunter decided to run the locomotive around via the main line. This was a movement that was only to be made in an emergency, and even then only with permission from the signalman at Birmingham New Street Signal Box.

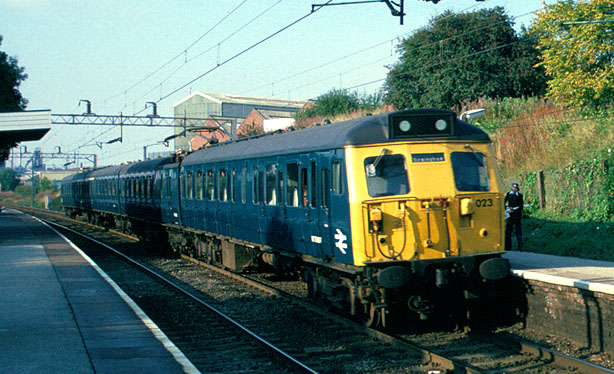
A class 304 unit similar to the one involved in the collision, seen in 1979

The Head Shunter did not seek such permission and when his hand signal for the guard was misunderstood by the secondman, the locomotive moved on to the main line just as a Manchester-Coventry four-carriage Class 304 electric unit no.026 was approaching. It struck the locomotive a glancing blow at about 60 mph, derailing the first two carriages which finished on their side, killing the driver and eight passengers. In addition, 16 people were injured.

The leading coach of the multiple unit was cut up on site. The second vehicle was removed to Wolverton, but never returned to service.
