= Shades of Black (organisation) =

Community organization in Birmingham, England

Shades of Black is a community organization in the Handsworth area of Birmingham, England, formed after the Handsworth riots in the mid-1980s, extending from the 1990s to work in other deprived areas including Stechford.

The group works with local schools at two large allotments in the city.

Children from disadvantaged backgrounds are taught about vegetable gardening. The produce is distributed to elderly people who cook for themselves, to elderly day care centres and any surplus used at a local catering college to help students prepare food from other cultures.

The founder, Mrs E C McGhie-Belgrave, a former probation worker, was awarded an MBE by the Queen in 2002.
