= Hilbre Island Lighthouse =

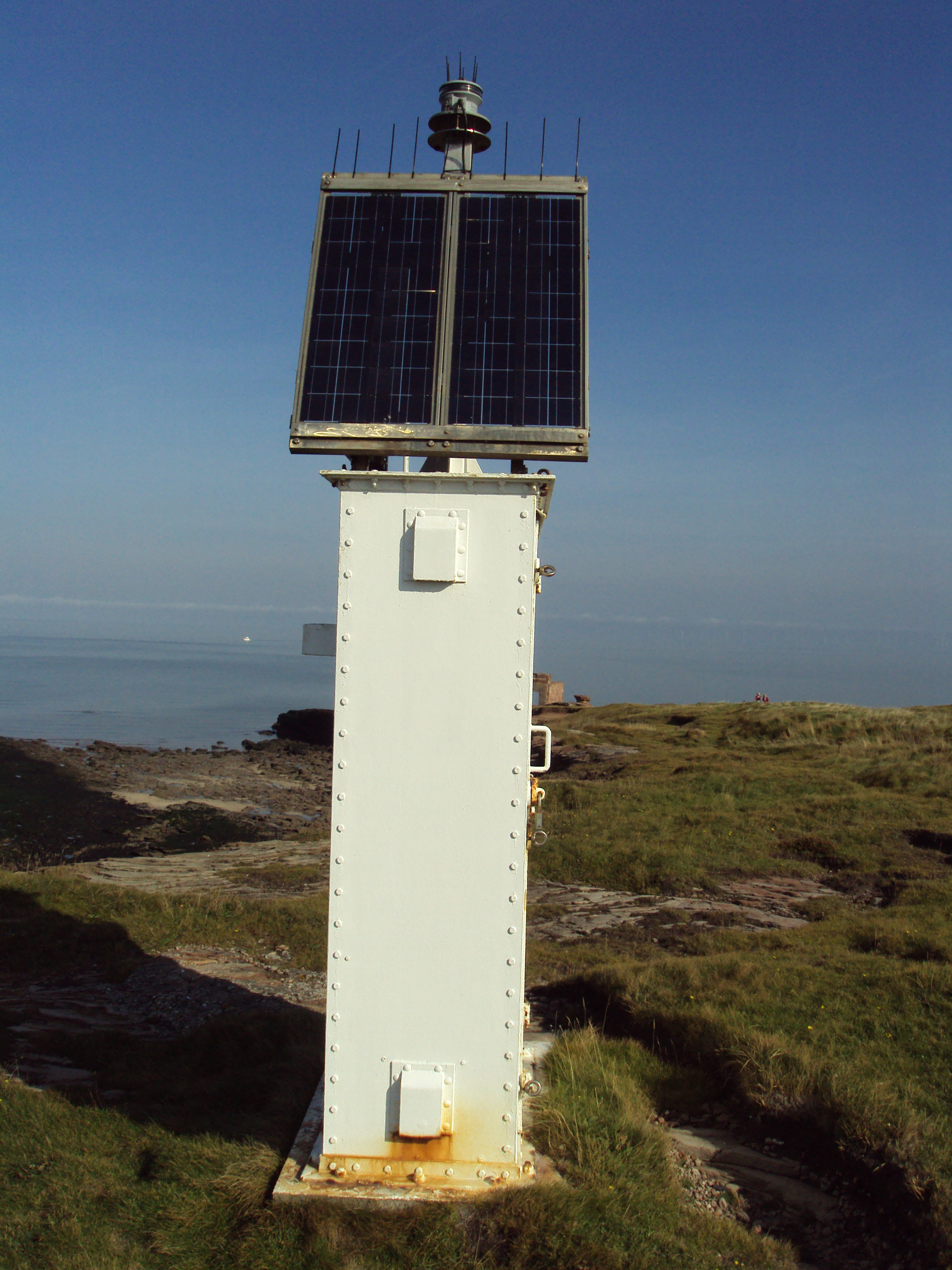
- Hilbre Island Light
- Location: Hilbre Island; Hoylake; Wirral; England
- Coordinates: 53°22′59.2″N 3°13′42.6″W

Tower
- Constructed: 1927
- Foundation: concrete base
- Construction: steel tower
- Automated: yes
- Height: 3 m (10 ft)
- Shape: square tower with solar panel and light
- Markings: white tower
- Power source: solar power
- Operator: Trinity House

Light
- Focal height: 14 m (46 ft)
- Lens: LED lantern
- Intensity: 71 candela
- Range: 5 nmi (9.3 km; 5.8 mi)
- Characteristic: Red flash every 3 seconds

Hilbre Island Lighthouse is located on Hilbre Island acting as a port landmark for the Hilbre swash in the River Dee estuary. It was established in 1927 by the Mersey Docks and Harbour Board Authority, now the Mersey Docks and Harbour Company, but has been operated by Trinity House since 1973. It was converted from acetylene gas to solar-power operation in 1995.

The lighthouse, which is 3 metres (10 ft) tall, has a light that is 14 metres (46 ft) above mean high water and a range of 5 nautical miles (9.3 km; 5.8 mi).

== See also ==
- List of lighthouses in England
