= Off-white (disambiguation) =

Off-white refers to any color that is a close variation of white.

- Off-White (company), a clothing brand founded by Virgil Abloh
- Off White, a 1979 album by James White and the Blacks
