= Stechford =

Area of Birmingham, England

Coordinates: 52°28′58″N 1°48′25″W

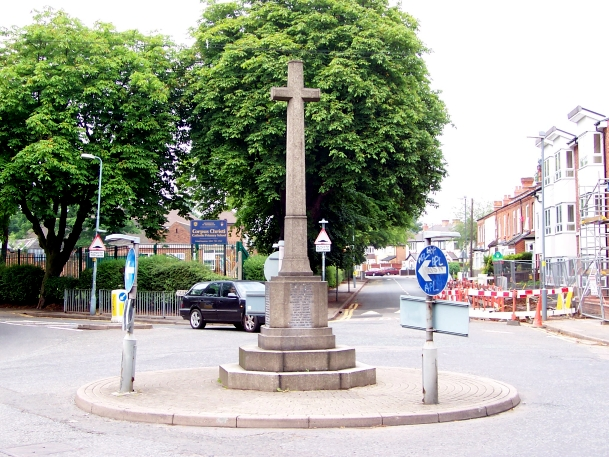
- The Stone Cross war memorial, near the A4040

- Location within the West Midlands
- Metropolitan borough: Birmingham
- Metropolitan county: West Midlands
- Region: West Midlands
- Country: England
- Sovereign state: United Kingdom
- Post town: Birmingham
- Postcode district: B33
- Dialling code: 0121
- Police: West Midlands
- Fire: West Midlands
- Ambulance: West Midlands
- UK Parliament: Birmingham Yardley

Stechford /ˈstɛtʃfərd/ is an area of east Birmingham, England, situated about five miles (8.0 km) east of the city centre, bordering Bordesley Green, Ward End, Yardley, Hodge Hill and Kitts Green. Historically it lay within Worcestershire, on the boundary of Warwickshire.

== History ==
Stechford's history is unclear. Its oldest components are Station Road (known as Stoney Lane since Norman times) and Flaxleye Farm, first referenced in 1218. The farm itself no longer remains, however there is a farmhouse at 143 Flaxley Road, although the oldest parts of the current building cannot be older than the 17th century. The closest buildings of historical importance are St Edburgh's church and Blakesley Hall, both a stone's throw outside Stechford in Yardley. The name Stechford is apparently a reference to the Stich or Stitch, a local tributary of the River Cole, although the Stitch is now entirely under culverts. A ford over the Cole is first referenced in 1249. The name Stechford was unknown until the construction of Stechford Station in 1844, and it has been conjectured that it was simply a railway misspelling. The name Stycheforde is attested since 1400. The common misspelling Stetchford is not an acceptable variant.

Old Stechford appears to have been mainly a cluster of buildings around the railway station. Until 1900, most of the area was still farmland. Some station houses are still present and remain along the main road. However, development on this area was considered difficult due to the steep gradient of the land nearby which can clearly be seen. This resulted in buildings built on the slope having to have stilts located underneath the ground floor. In some buildings, these are clearly visible.

For most of the 20th century Stechford was its own parliamentary constituency, represented by Roy Jenkins, Labour for 27 years from 1950, although it has been alleged in parliament that he never lived there. When Jenkins stepped down to become a European Commissioner in 1977, the seat was won by Conservative Andrew MacKay, and Jenkins's future partners, the Liberal Party were leapfrogged by the British National Front, whose candidate Andrew Brons obtained third place. The National Front and its successor British National Party have continued to target the area. In 1983, the Stechford constituency was broken up into Birmingham Hodge Hill and Birmingham Yardley.

The first UK branch of German discount supermarket Aldi opened in 1990.

== Politics ==
Stechford is part of the Yardley West and Stechford ward of the Yardley constituency. As of 2026, the councillor is Baber Baz of the Liberal Democrats, and the MP is Labour MP Jess Phillips . Until 2005, the constituency was held by Estelle Morris (Labour), who was Secretary of State for Education in Tony Blair's Labour administration. From 1950 to 1977, the area was represented in the Stechford constituency by Roy Jenkins, (as a Labour MP), who was one of the most prominent figures in British politics between the 1960s and 1980s. The ward councillors work closely with an advisory board of local people, which has led to the creation of a playground area next to the Cascades, the provision of security gates on multiple access alleys, and improvements to street lighting.

Politician Enoch Powell was born at Flaxley Lane, Stechford, in 1912. He moved to Kings Norton in 1918 and would later go on to be a classical scholar, poet, youngest brigadier in the British Army when he fought in the Second World War, and politician. He is best known for his Rivers of Blood speech in 1968.

== Attractions ==
Stechford has a long-standing row of shops along Station Road, with a lesser group of shops on Albert Road.There is also Stechford Retail Park located off Iron lane and the A4040 Highway. Main shopping centres are connected by the Outer Ring Road (A4040) and Outer Circle bus. Nearby shopping areas are the Fox & Goose in Ward End and The Yew Tree in Yardley. Links to Birmingham are provided by bus services 14 (Audley Road) and 97 (Bordesley Green East).

The local railway station is Stechford railway station. On 28 February 1967, it was the scene of the Stechford rail crash, which killed nine people and injured 16. Opposite the station is The Stechford Club which was founded in 1907. Houses in the area are mainly council houses or old Victorian houses built around the station.

== Churches ==
Stechford has three churches. Stechford Baptist, on Victoria Road, All Saints (Anglican) on Albert Road, and Corpus Christi (Catholic) on Albert Road. The churches hold an annual Remembrance Day service at the Five Ways War Memorial on Remembrance Sunday, early November, which is attended by about 200 people.

== Geography ==
The district is cut across by the River Cole, the Birmingham to London railway, and the Birmingham Outer Circle (A4040).

All of the land around the Cole is flood plain, which means that Stechford has a wide swathe of green, semi-wild vegetation. It is still possible to canoe from Stechford to Water Orton. The Cole and the green area around it, are being restored through the Kingfisher Project.

The project also takes in Stechford Fairground, which is home to two funfairs each year. The area around the River Cole is now green belt land which prevents developers from constructing on the site.

== Healthcare ==
- National Health Service care is provided by Birmingham East and North Primary Care Trust
- Heartlands Hospital is a major local employer
