= Edburga =

The name Edburga (Old English: Ēadburh or Ēadburg) may refer to:

- Saint Edburga of Bicester, an English saint from the 7th century
- Saint Edburga of Minster-in-Thanet (died 751), royal princess, the only daughter of King Centwine and Queen Engyth of Wessex in the 8th century of the Kent royal family
- Saint Edburga of Repton (died c. 700), also known as Saint Eadburh (Edburga) of Repton
- Saint Edburga of Winchester (died 960), also known as Edburga of Nunnaminster, daughter of King Edward the Elder
- Eadburh of Mercia, daughter of King Offa of Mercia (reigned 757–796, his death) and wife of King Beorhtric of Wessex (reigned 786–802)
- Eadburh, died c. 890, mother of Ealhswith, who was the wife of Alfred the Great
